= Halima =

Halima, Haleema, Halema, Halimah, Halimahton, Halimat, Halimaton, Halimatu, Halime, Halimé, or Halimey is a feminine given name and surname of Arabic origin. It means "forbearing", "gentle", "mild-mannered", or "generous". Notable people with the name include:

== Given name ==
=== Haleema ===
- Haleema Shakur-Still, British medical researcher and academic

=== Halema ===
- Halema Boland, Kuwaiti television presenter and fashion model

=== Halima ===
- Halima IV, Sultana regnant of the Anjouan sultanate
- Halima El Abassi (born 1978), Danish-Moroccan social worker, researcher, and debater
- Halima Abubakar (born 1985), Nigerian actress
- Halima Yakoy Adam (born 2000), Chadian paralegal and women's rights activist
- Halima Adamu (born 1950), Nigerian pediatrician, writer, and politician
- Halima Ali Adan (born 1984), Somali women's rights activist
- Halima Aden (born 1997), Somali-American model
- Halima Ahmed, Somali political activist
- Halima Tayo Alao (born 1956), Nigerian architect and politician
- Halima Aliyeva (1952–2019), Azerbaijani first lady
- Halima Atete (born 1988), Nigerian actress and film producer
- Halima Bashir, Sudanese medical doctor and author
- Halima Begum, British-Bangladeshi charity executive and activist
- Halima Buba, Nigerian businesswoman and banker
- Halima Abdallah Bulembo (born 1991), Tanzanian politician
- Halima Cassell (born 1975), British-Pakistani sculptor and ceramicist
- Halima Chehaima (born 1988), Moroccan-Belgian beauty queen
- Halima Cissé (born 1996), Malian mother to nonuplets
- Halima Dangote, Nigerian businesswoman
- Halima Daud, Malawian politician
- Halima bint Abi Dhu'ayb (died 631), foster mother of the Islamic prophet Muhammad
- Halima Elkhatabi, Canadian filmmaker
- Halima Ferhat (1941–2026), Moroccan historian
- Halima Godane (1935–1994), Somali poet and activist
- Halima Hachlaf (born 1988), Moroccan runner
- Halima Ismail Ibrahim, Somali civil servant
- Halima Kanni (born 1964), Tunisian politician
- Halima Sadaf Karimi, Afghan politician and activist
- Halima Khatun (1933–2018), Bangladeshi activist, writer, and academic
- Halima Khatun (politician), Bangladeshi politician
- Halima Krausen (born 1949), German Islamic theologian and scholar
- Halima Mdee (born 1978), Tanzanian politician
- Halima Nakachwa (born 1988), Ugandan netball player
- Halima Namakula (born 1960), Ugandan musician, actress, entrepreneur, and humanitarian
- Halima Nosirova (1913–2003), Uzbek singer
- Halima Ouardiri, Swiss-Canadian film director, screenwriter, and producer
- Halima Rafat, Afghan nurse and women's rights activist
- Halima Rafiq (1997–2014), Pakistani cricketer
- Halima Saldulker (born 1957), South African judge
- Halima Idris Salim (1994–2023), Sudanese journalist
- Halima Soussi (born 1965), French basketball player
- Halima Al Sufyaniyah, Moroccan royal consort
- Halima Hassan Tukur, Nigerian politician
- Halima Embarek Warzazi (born 1933), Moroccan diplomat and human rights activist
- Halima Xudoyberdiyeva (1947–2018), Uzbek poet

=== Halimah ===
- Halimah Ali (born 1960), Malaysian politician
- Halimah Marcus, American writer, anthologist, and editor
- Halimah Nakaayi (born 1994), Ugandan middle-distance runner
- Halimah Mohamed Sadique (born 1962), Malaysian politician
- Halimah Yacob (born 1954), Singaporean politician

=== Halimahton ===
- Halimahton Abdul Majid (1920–??), Malaysian politician

=== Halimat ===
- Halimat Adio (born 1998), British-Nigerian netball player
- Halimat Ismaila (born 1984), Nigerian athlete

=== Halimaton ===
- Halimaton Shaadiah Saad (born 1969), Malaysian politician

=== Halimatu ===
- Halimatu Ayinde (born 1995), Nigerian footballer

=== Halime ===
- Halime Tuana Arslan (born 2005), Turkish handball player
- Halime Çavuş (1898–1976), Turkish war hero
- Halime Eke (born 1999), Turkish martial artist
- Halime Gulsu (1984–2018), Turkish educator and prisoner
- Halime Hatun (died 1281), Ottoman queen
- Halime İslamoğlu (born 1993), Turkish handball player
- Halime Oguz (born 1970), Turkish-Danish politician
- Halime Sultan (1570–??), Ottoman queen consort
- Halime Yıldız (born 1980), Turkish para badminton player
- Halime Zülal Zeren (born 1995), Turkish swimmer

=== Halimey ===
- Halimey Abu Bakar (born 1972), Malaysian politician

== Surname ==
=== Halimé ===
- Hadjé Halimé Oumar (1930–2001), Chadian activist, educator, and politician

== Places ==
- Halimeh Jan, also known as Halīmjān and Khalimdzhakh, a village in Blukat Rural District, Rahmatabad and Blukat District, Rudbar County, Gilan Province, Iran
- Kawrat Halimah, a village in Yemen
