= Sibun =

Sibun may mean:

- Sibon, also Romanized as Sībon; also known as Sībūn), a village in Khurgam Rural District of Khurgam District, Rudbar County, Gilan province, Iran.
- Sibun River, river in Belize
