= Darreh Mahalleh =

Village in Gilan province, Iran

Darreh Mahalleh Persian: دره محله
- Village
- Location within Iran
- Coordinates: 36.876°N 49.545°E
- Country: Iran
- Province: Gilan
- County: Rudbar
- District: Rahmatabad and Blukat
- Rural District: Rahmatabad

Population (2016)
  - Total: 233
- Time zone: UTC+3:30 (IRST)

Darreh Mahalleh (Persian: دره محله) (Note: Also romanized as Darreh Maḩalleh; also known as Dārā Maḩalleh (دارا محله)) is a village in Rahmatabad Rural District of Rahmatabad and Blukat District in Rudbar County, Gilan province, Iran. It is just east of Sondos village.

== Demographics ==
=== Population ===
At the time of the 2006 National Census, the village's population was 283 in 85 households. The following census in 2011 counted 307 people in 91 households. The 2016 census measured the population of the village as 233 people in 76 households.
