= Renasak Bon =

Renasak Bon رناسك بن
- Village
- Location within Iran
- Coordinates: 36°58′41″N 49°37′40″E
- Country: Iran
- Province: Gilan
- County: Rudbar
- Bakhsh: Rahmatabad and Blukat
- Rural District: Blukat

Population (2006)
  - Total: 87
- Time zone: UTC+3:30 (IRST)
  - Summer (DST): UTC+4:30 (IRDT)

Renasak Bon (Persian: رناسك بن, also Romanized as Renāsak Bon; also known as Rīnāsokovand) is a village in Blukat Rural District, Rahmatabad and Blukat District, Rudbar County, Gilan Province, Iran. At the 2006 census, its population was 87, in 14 families.
