= Rudsar, Rudbar =

Rud Sar رودسر
- Village
- Location within Iran
- Coordinates: 36°58′09″N 49°43′53″E
- Country: Iran
- Province: Gilan
- County: Rudbar
- Bakhsh: Rahmatabad and Blukat
- Rural District: Blukat

Population (2006)
  - Total: 554
- Time zone: UTC+3:30 (IRST)
  - Summer (DST): UTC+4:30 (IRDT)

Rudsar or Rud Sar (Persian: رودسر, also Romanized as Rūd Sar) is a village in Blukat Rural District, Rahmatabad and Blukat District, Rudbar County, Gilan Province, Iran. At the 2006 census, its population was 554, in 134 families.
