= Lapeh Sara =

Lapeh Sara لپه سرا
- Village
- Location within Iran
- Coordinates: 37°00′15″N 49°44′06″E
- Country: Iran
- Province: Gilan
- County: Rudbar
- Bakhsh: Rahmatabad and Blukat
- Rural District: Blukat

Population (2006)
  - Total: 39
- Time zone: UTC+3:30 (IRST)
  - Summer (DST): UTC+4:30 (IRDT)

Lapeh Sara (Persian: لپه سرا, also Romanized as Lapeh Sarā) is a village in Blukat Rural District, Rahmatabad and Blukat District, Rudbar County, Gilan Province, Iran. At the 2006 census, its population was 39, in 8 families.
