= Dilma Deh =

Dilma Deh ديلماده
- Village
- Location within Iran
- Coordinates: 37°00′14″N 49°42′21″E
- Country: Iran
- Province: Gilan
- County: Rudbar
- Bakhsh: Rahmatabad and Blukat
- Rural District: Blukat

Population (2006)
  - Total: 102
- Time zone: UTC+3:30 (IRST)
  - Summer (DST): UTC+4:30 (IRDT)

Dilma Deh (Persian: ديلماده, also Romanized as Dīlmā Deh; also known as Delamdeh) is a village in Blukat Rural District, Rahmatabad and Blukat District, Rudbar County, Gilan Province, Iran. At the 2006 census, its population was 102, in 23 families.
