= Sarfarirud =

Sarfarirud سرفريرود
- Village
- Location within Iran
- Coordinates: 36°57′00″N 49°38′00″E
- Country: Iran
- Province: Gilan
- County: Rudbar
- Bakhsh: Rahmatabad and Blukat
- Rural District: Blukat

Population (2006)
  - Total: 24
- Time zone: UTC+3:30 (IRST)
  - Summer (DST): UTC+4:30 (IRDT)

Sarfarirud (Persian: سرفريرود, also Romanized as Sarfarīrūd; also known as Sarfrārūd) is a village in Blukat Rural District, Rahmatabad and Blukat District, Rudbar County, Gilan Province, Iran. At the 2006 census, its population was 24, in 6 families.
