= Mush Bijar =

Mush Bijar موش بيجار
- Village
- Location within Iran
- Coordinates: 37°00′18″N 49°40′39″E
- Country: Iran
- Province: Gilan
- County: Rudbar
- Bakhsh: Rahmatabad and Blukat
- Rural District: Blukat

Population (2006)
  - Total: 59
- Time zone: UTC+3:30 (IRST)
  - Summer (DST): UTC+4:30 (IRDT)

Mush Bijar (Persian: موش بيجار, also Romanized as Mūsh Bījār; also known as Musmudzhal) is a village in Blukat Rural District, Rahmatabad and Blukat District, Rudbar County, Gilan Province, Iran. At the 2006 census, its population was 59, in 18 families.
