= Doldim-e Bozorg =

Doldim-e Bozorg دلديم بزرگ
- Village
- Location within Iran
- Coordinates: 37°04′01″N 49°44′26″E
- Country: Iran
- Province: Gilan
- County: Rudbar
- Bakhsh: Rahmatabad and Blukat
- Rural District: Blukat

Population (2006)
  - Total: 166
- Time zone: UTC+3:30 (IRST)
  - Summer (DST): UTC+4:30 (IRDT)

Doldim-e Bozorg (Persian: دلديم بزرگ, also Romanized as Doldīm-e Bozorg; also known as Doldīm) is a village in Blukat Rural District, Rahmatabad and Blukat District, Rudbar County, Gilan Province, Iran. At the 2006 census, its population was 166, in 33 families.
