= Reshi =

Reshi may refer to:

- Reshi, Taoyuan (热市镇), a town in Taoyuan County, Hunan Province, China.
- Rashi, Iran or Reshi, a village in Dasht-e Veyl Rural District, Rudbar County, Gilan Province, Iran.
