= Seh Pestanak =

Seh Pestanak سه پستانک
- Village
- Location within Iran
- Coordinates: 36°47′17″N 49°48′40″E
- Country: Iran
- Province: Gilan
- County: Rudbar
- Bakhsh: Khorgam
- Rural District: Khorgam

Population (2016)
  - Total: 162
- Time zone: UTC+3:30 (IRST)

Seh Pestanak (Persian: سه پستانک, also Romanized as Seh Pestānak; also known as Sepestānak, Sībestānak, and Sivistanak) is a village in Khorgam Rural District, Khorgam District, Rudbar County, Gilan Province, Iran. At the 2016 census, its population was 162, in 68 families. Up from 148 in 2006.
