= Kalayeh, Rudbar =

Kalayeh كلايه
- Village
- Location within Iran
- Coordinates: 36°51′08″N 49°31′25″E
- Country: Iran
- Province: Gilan
- County: Rudbar
- Bakhsh: Rahmatabad and Blukat
- Rural District: Rahmatabad

Population (2016)
  - Total: 185
- Time zone: UTC+3:30 (IRST)

Kalayeh (Persian: كلايه, also Romanized as Kalāyeh; also known as Kalāi, Kelā’ī, and Kelaya) is a village in Rahmatabad Rural District, Rahmatabad and Blukat District, Rudbar County, Gilan Province, Iran.

At the time of the 2006 National Census, the village's population was 189 in 56 households. The following census in 2011 counted 173 people in 55 households. The 2016 census measured the population of the village as 185 people in 63 households.
