= Nash, Iran =

Nash ناش
- Village
- Location within Iran
- Coordinates: 36°48′50″N 49°47′50″E
- Country: Iran
- Province: Gilan
- County: Rudbar
- Bakhsh: Khorgam
- Rural District: Khorgam

Population (2016)
  - Total: 298
- Time zone: UTC+3:30 (IRST)

Nash (Persian: ناش, also Romanized as Nāsh) is a village in Khorgam Rural District, Khorgam District, Rudbar County, Gilan Province, Iran. At the 2016 census, its population was 298, in 116 families. Down from 414 people in 2006.
