= Garzaneh Chak =

Garzaneh Chak گرزنه چاک
- Village
- Location within Iran
- Coordinates: 36°46′42″N 49°50′01″E
- Country: Iran
- Province: Gilan
- County: Rudbar
- Bakhsh: Khorgam
- Rural District: Khorgam

Population (2016)
  - Total: 36
- Time zone: UTC+3:30 (IRST)

Garzaneh Chak (Persian: گرزنه چاک, also Romanized as Garzaneh Chāk; also known as Gazneh Chāk) is a village in Khorgam Rural District, Khorgam District, Rudbar County, Gilan Province, Iran. At the 2016 census, its population was 36, in 14 families.
