= Magas Khani =

Magas Khani مگس خانی
- Village
- Location within Iran
- Coordinates: 36°48′07″N 49°49′59″E
- Country: Iran
- Province: Gilan
- County: Rudbar
- Bakhsh: Khorgam
- Rural District: Khorgam

Population (2016)
  - Total: 23
- Time zone: UTC+3:30 (IRST)

Magas Khani (Persian: مگس خانی, also Romanized as Magas Khānī; also known as Galaskhānī) is a village in Khorgam Rural District, Khorgam District, Rudbar County, Gilan Province, Iran. At the 2006 census, its population was 29, in 6 families. In 2016, it had 23 people in 9 households.
