= Bararud =

Village in Gilan province, Iran

Bararud Persian: برارود
- Village
- Location within Iran
- Coordinates: 36°47′12″N 49°41′44″E
- Country: Iran
- Province: Gilan
- County: Rudbar
- District: Khurgam
- Rural District: Dolfak

Population (2016)
  - Total: 127
- Time zone: UTC+3:30 (IRST)

Bararud (Persian: برارود) (Note: Also romanized as Barārūd; also known as Bararu) is a village in Dolfak Rural District of Khurgam District in Rudbar County, Gilan province, Iran.

== Demographics ==
=== Population ===
At the time of the 2006 National Census, the village's population was 182 in 64 households. The following census in 2011 counted 115 people in 54 households. The 2016 census measured the population of the village as 127 people in 60 households.
