= Liafu =

Village in Gilan province, Iran

Liafu Persian: ليافو
- Village
- Location within Iran
- Coordinates: 37°04′53″N 49°43′53″E
- Country: Iran
- Province: Gilan
- County: Rudbar
- District: Rahmatabad and Blukat
- Rural District: Blukat

Population (2016)
  - Total: 265
- Time zone: UTC+3:30 (IRST)

Liafu (Persian: ليافو) (Note: Also romanized as Leyafoo, Leyāfū, and Līāfū; also known as Leyāfū Doldīm, and Līāfū Doldīm) is a village in Blukat Rural District of Rahmatabad and Blukat District in Rudbar County, Gilan province, Iran.

== Demographics ==
=== Population ===
At the time of the 2006 National Census, the village's population was 198 in 51 households. The following census in 2011 counted 190 people in 56 households. The 2016 census measured the population of the village as 265 people in 88 households.
