= Espahabdan =

Espahabdan اسپهبدان
- Village
- Location within Iran
- Coordinates: 36°52′29″N 49°46′43″E
- Country: Iran
- Province: Gilan
- County: Rudbar
- Bakhsh: Khorgam
- Rural District: Khorgam

Population (2016)
  - Total: 57
- Time zone: UTC+3:30 (IRST)

Espahabdan (Persian: اسپهبدان, also Romanized as Espahabdān; also known as Esbābzel and Espābzel) is a village in Khorgam Rural District, Khorgam District, Rudbar County, Gilan Province, Iran. At the 2016 census, its population was 57, in 23 families. Up from 47 in 2006.
