= Jazem Kol =

Village in Gilan Province, Iran

Jazem Kol جازمكل
- Village
- Location within Iran
- Coordinates: 36°51′13″N 49°29′23″E
- Country: Iran
- Province: Gilan
- County: Rudbar
- Bakhsh: Rahmatabad and Blukat
- Rural District: Rahmatabad

Population (2016)
  - Total: 20
- Time zone: UTC+3:30 (IRST)

Jazem Kol (Persian: جازمكل, also Romanized as Jāzem Kol) is a village in Rahmatabad Rural District, Rahmatabad and Blukat District, Rudbar County, Gilan Province, Iran.

At the time of the 2006 National Census, the village's population was 36 in 12 households. The following census in 2011 counted 19 people in 8 households. The 2016 census measured the population of the village as 20 people in 7 households.
