= Fishom =

Fishom فيشم
- Village
- Location within Iran
- Coordinates: 36°50′32″N 49°28′52″E
- Country: Iran
- Province: Gilan
- County: Rudbar
- Bakhsh: Rahmatabad and Blukat
- Rural District: Rahmatabad

Population (2006)
  - Total: 194
- Time zone: UTC+3:30 (IRST)

Fishom (Persian: فيشم, also Romanized as Fīshom) is a village in Rahmatabad Rural District, Rahmatabad and Blukat District, Rudbar County, Gilan Province, Iran. At the 2016 census, its population was 143, in 48 families. Down from 194 in 2006.
