= Mirza Golband =

Village in Gilan province, Iran

Mirza Golband Persian: ميرزاگلبند
- Village
- Location within Iran
- Coordinates: 37°02′40″N 49°40′57″E
- Country: Iran
- Province: Gilan
- County: Rudbar
- District: Rahmatabad and Blukat
- Rural District: Blukat

Population (2016)
  - Total: 322
- Time zone: UTC+3:30 (IRST)

Mirza Golband (Persian: ميرزاگلبند) (Note: Also romanized as Mīrzā Golband) is a village in Blukat Rural District of Rahmatabad and Blukat District in Rudbar County, Gilan province, Iran.

== Demographics ==
=== Population ===
At the time of the 2006 National Census, the village's population was 405 in 100 households. The following census in 2011 counted 376 people in 106 households. The 2016 census measured the population of the village as 322 people in 113 households.
