= Hajji Shirkia =

Hajji Shirkia حاجی شيركيا
- Village
- Location within Iran
- Coordinates: 36°48′00″N 49°35′00″E
- Country: Iran
- Province: Gilan
- County: Rudbar
- Bakhsh: Rahmatabad and Blukat
- Rural District: Dasht-e Veyl

Population (2016)
  - Total: 51
- Time zone: UTC+3:30 (IRST)

Hajji Shirkia (Persian: حاجی شيركيا, also Romanized as Ḩājjī Shīrkīā) is a village in Dasht-e Veyl Rural District of Rudbar County, in Gilan Province, Iran. Its population was 51 people in 15 households at the 2016 census, decreased from 135 people in 2006.
