= Shir Kuh, Gilan =

Village in Gilan province, Iran

Shir Kuh Persian: شيركوه
- Village
- Location within Iran
- Coordinates: 36°53′24″N 49°33′53″E
- Country: Iran
- Province: Gilan
- County: Rudbar
- District: Rahmatabad and Blukat
- Rural District: Rahmatabad

Population (2016)
  - Total: 492
- Time zone: UTC+3:30 (IRST)

Shir Kuh (Persian: شيركوه) (Note: Also romanized as Shīr Kūh; also known as Shīrākūh and Shirkukh) is a village in Rahmatabad Rural District of Rahmatabad and Blukat District in Rudbar County, Gilan province, Iran.

== Demographics ==
=== Population ===
At the time of the 2006 National Census, the village's population was 577 in 182 households. The following census in 2011 counted 537 people in 181 households. The 2016 census measured the population of the village as 492 people in 187 households.
