= Estalakh Jan =

Village in Gilan province, Iran

Estalakh Jan Persian: اسطلخ جان
- Village
- Location within Iran
- Coordinates: 36°55′11″N 49°33′01″E
- Country: Iran
- Province: Gilan
- County: Rudbar
- District: Rahmatabad and Blukat
- Rural District: Rahmatabad

Population (2016)
  - Total: 666
- Time zone: UTC+3:30 (IRST)

Estalakh Jan (Persian: اسطلخ جان) (Note: Also romanized as Esţalakh Jān and Esţalkh Jān) is a village in Rahmatabad Rural District of Rahmatabad and Blukat District in Rudbar County, Gilan province, Iran.

== Demographics ==
=== Population ===
At the time of the 2006 National Census, the village's population was 834 in 219 households. The following census in 2011 counted 787 people in 222 households. The 2016 census measured the population of the village as 666 people in 203 households. It was the most populous village in its rural district.
