= Kashkjan =

Kashkjan كشک جان
- Village
- Location within Iran
- Coordinates: 36°52′37″N 49°32′05″E
- Country: Iran
- Province: Gilan
- County: Rudbar
- Bakhsh: Rahmatabad and Blukat
- Rural District: Rahmatabad

Population (2016)
  - Total: 22
- Time zone: UTC+3:30 (IRST)

Kashkjan (Persian: كشک جان, also Romanized as Kashkjān) is a village in Rahmatabad Rural District, Rahmatabad and Blukat District, Rudbar County, Gilan Province, Iran.

At the time of the 2006 National Census, the village's population was 27 in 10 households. The following census in 2011 counted 24 people in 8 households. The 2016 census measured the population of the village as 22 people in 7 households.
