= Karaf Chal =

Karaf Chal كرف چال
- Village
- Location within Iran
- Coordinates: 36°47′26″N 49°49′20″E
- Country: Iran
- Province: Gilan
- County: Rudbar
- Bakhsh: Khorgam
- Rural District: Khorgam

Population (2016)
  - Total: 35
- Time zone: UTC+3:30 (IRST)

Karaf Chal (Persian: كرف چال, also Romanized as Karaf Chāl) is a village in Khorgam Rural District, Khorgam District, Rudbar County, Gilan Province, Iran. At the 2016 census, its population was 35, in 11 families Increased from 16 people in 2006.
