= Donbal Deh =

Donbal Deh دنبالده
- Village
- Location within Iran
- Coordinates: 36°47′54″N 49°48′08″E
- Country: Iran
- Province: Gilan
- County: Rudbar
- Bakhsh: Khorgam
- Rural District: Khorgam

Population (2016)
  - Total: 55
- Time zone: UTC+3:30 (IRST)

Donbal Deh (Persian: دنبالده, also Romanized as Donbāl Deh; also known as Donbāleh Deh) is a village in Khorgam Rural District, Khorgam District, Rudbar County, Gilan Province, Iran. At the 2016 census, its population was 55, in 20 families. Up from 36 people in 2006.
