= Gerd Visheh =

Gerd Visheh گردويشه
- Village
- Location within Iran
- Coordinates: 36°48′01″N 49°42′47″E
- Country: Iran
- Province: Gilan
- County: Rudbar
- Bakhsh: Khorgam
- Rural District: Khorgam

Population (2016)
  - Total: 235
- Time zone: UTC+3:30 (IRST)

Gerd Visheh (Persian: گردويشه, also Romanized as Gerd Vīsheh and Gardvishāh; also known as Gardevishe and Gerdeh Bīsheh) is a village with the Kurdish speaking people (The majority speak Kurmqnci, shikaki and the minority of few speak Sorani )in Khorgam Rural District, Khorgam District, Rudbar County, Gilan province, Iran. At the 2016 census, its population was 235, in 99 families. Up from 221 in 2006.
