= Darreh Dasht =

Darreh Dasht دره دشت
- Village
- Location within Iran
- Coordinates: 36°48′11″N 49°38′24″E
- Country: Iran
- Province: Gilan
- County: Rudbar
- Bakhsh: Rahmatabad and Blukat
- Rural District: Dasht-e Veyl

Population (2016)
  - Total: 43
- Time zone: UTC+3:30 (IRST)

Darreh Dasht (Persian: دره دشت, also Romanized as Darrehdasht) is a village in Dasht-e Veyl Rural District, Rahmatabad and Blukat District, Rudbar County, Gilan Province, Iran. At the 2016 census, its population was 43, in 15 families. Increased from 11 people in 2006.
