= Kharashk =

خِرِشک خِرِشک
- village
- Khereshk
- Location within Iran
- Coordinates: 36°54′24″N 49°32′29″E
- Country: Iran
- Province: Gilan
- County: Rudbar
- Bakhsh: Rahmatabad and Blukat
- Rural District: Rahmatabad

Population (2016)
  - Total: 108
- Time zone: UTC+3:30 (IRST)

Khereshk (Persian: خرشك, also Romanized as Khareshk and Khereshk; also known as (Khereshk-e Pā’īn, Bālā Maḩalleh-ye Khereshk, Khereshki) is a village in Rahmatabad Rural District, Rahmatabad and Blukat District, Rudbar County, Gilan Province, Iran.

At the time of the 2006 National Census, the village's population was 124. The following census in 2011 counted 84 people in 30 households. The 2016 census measured the population of the village as 108 people in 42 households.
