= Galankash =

Village in Gilan province, Iran

Galankash Persian: گلنکش
- Village
- Location within Iran
- Coordinates: 36°49′32″N 49°45′43″E
- Country: Iran
- Province: Gilan
- County: Rudbar
- District: Khurgam
- Rural District: Khurgam

Population (2016)
  - Total: 448
- Time zone: UTC+3:30 (IRST)

Galankash (Persian: گلنکش) (Note: Also known as Galangash) is a village in Khurgam Rural District of Khurgam District in Rudbar County, Gilan province, Iran.

== Demographics ==
=== Population ===
At the time of the 2006 National Census, the village's population was 626 in 164 households. The following census in 2011 counted 476 people in 146 households. The 2016 census measured the population of the village as 448 people in 151 households.
