= Shir Kadeh =

Village in Gilan province, Iran

Shir Kadeh Persian: شيركده
- Village
- Location within Iran
- Coordinates: 36°47′12″N 49°39′20″E
- Country: Iran
- Province: Gilan
- County: Rudbar
- District: Khurgam
- Rural District: Dolfak

Population (2016)
  - Total: 246
- Time zone: UTC+3:30 (IRST)

Shir Kadeh (Persian: شيركده) (Note: Also romanized as Shīr Kadeh; also known as Shīr Kandī) is a village in Dolfak Rural District of Khurgam District in Rudbar County, Gilan province, Iran.

== Demographics ==
=== Population ===
At the time of the 2006 National Census, the village's population was 292 in 59 households. The following census in 2011 counted 206 people in 83 households. The 2016 census measured the population of the village as 246 people in 91 households.
