= Konbak =

Konbak کنبک
- Village
- Location within Iran
- Coordinates: 36°49′47″N 49°38′00″E
- Country: Iran
- Province: Gilan
- County: Rudbar
- Bakhsh: Rahmatabad and Blukat
- Rural District: Dasht-e Veyl

Population (2016)
  - Total: 142
- Time zone: UTC+3:30 (IRST)

Konbak (Persian: کنبک; also known as Gonbak, Gumbak, and Konbag) is a village in Dasht-e Veyl Rural District, Rahmatabad and Blukat District, Rudbar County, Gilan Province, Iran. At the 2016 census, its population was 142, in 50 families. Up from 111 in 2006.
