= Fathkuh =

Fathkuh فتحكوه
- Village
- Location within Iran
- Coordinates: 36°54′31″N 49°33′12″E
- Country: Iran
- Province: Gilan
- County: Rudbar
- Bakhsh: Rahmatabad and Blukat
- Rural District: Rahmatabad

Population (2016)
  - Total: 167
- Time zone: UTC+3:30 (IRST)

Fathkuh (Persian: فتحكوه, also Romanized as Fatḩkūh; also known as Fatkūh) is a village in Rahmatabad Rural District, Rahmatabad and Blukat District, Rudbar County, Gilan Province, Iran.

At the time of the 2006 National Census, the village's population was 376 in 97 households. The following census in 2011 counted 345 people in 105 households. The 2016 census measured the population of the village as 167 people in 58 households.
