= Kandalat =

Village in Gilan province, Iran

Kandalat Persian: كندلات
- Village
- Location within Iran
- Coordinates: 37°00′16″N 49°35′52″E
- Country: Iran
- Province: Gilan
- County: Rudbar
- District: Rahmatabad and Blukat
- Rural District: Blukat

Population (2016)
  - Total: 275
- Time zone: UTC+3:30 (IRST)

Kandalat (Persian: كندلات) (Note: Also romanized as Kandalāt and Kandelāt; also known as Gandelāt, Kandah Lat, and Kandeh Lāt) is a village in Blukat Rural District of Rahmatabad and Blukat District in Rudbar County, Gilan province, Iran.

== Demographics ==
=== Population ===
At the time of the 2006 National Census, the village's population was 347 in 86 households. The following census in 2011 counted 266 people in 79 households. The 2016 census measured the population of the village as 275 people in 90 households.
