= Kolus Forush =

Kolus Forush كلوس فروش
- Village
- Location within Iran
- Coordinates: 36°50′08″N 49°33′47″E
- Country: Iran
- Province: Gilan
- County: Rudbar
- Bakhsh: Rahmatabad and Blukat
- Rural District: Dasht-e Veyl

Population (2006)
  - Total: 48
- Time zone: UTC+3:30 (IRST)

Kolus Forush (Persian: كلوس فروش, also Romanized as Kolūs Forūsh, Kaloos Foroosh, Kolash Forūsh, and Kolosforūsh; also known as Kholūşforūz, Kulusferoz, and Kulusferush) is a village in Dasht-e Veyl Rural District, Rahmatabad and Blukat District, Rudbar County, Gilan Province, Iran. At the 2016 census, its population was 48, in 15 families. Up from 41 in 2006.
