= Pastal Kuh =

Pastal Kuh پس طالكوه
- Village
- Location within Iran
- Coordinates: 36°49′15″N 49°40′46″E
- Country: Iran
- Province: Gilan
- County: Rudbar
- Bakhsh: Khorgam
- Rural District: Khorgam

Population (2016)
  - Total: 94
- Time zone: UTC+3:30 (IRST)

Pastal Kuh (Persian: پس طالكوه, also Romanized as Pasţāl Kūh; also known as Pastaleh Kūh) is a village in Khorgam Rural District, Khorgam District, Rudbar County, Gilan Province, Iran. At the 2006 census, its population was 117, in 30 families. In 2016, it had 94 people in 37 households.
