= Koshkosh =

Koshkosh كُشكُش
- Village
- Location within Iran
- Coordinates: 36°46′49″N 49°47′34″E
- Country: Iran
- Province: Gilan
- County: Rudbar
- Bakhsh: Khorgam
- Rural District: Khorgam

Population (2016)
  - Total: 33
- Time zone: UTC+3:30 (IRST)

Koshkosh (Persian: كشكش; also known as Gūsh Gūsh, Khushkushan, Kos̄kosh, and Kūsh Kūsh) is a village in Khorgam Rural District, Khorgam District, Rudbar County, Gilan Province, Iran. At the 2016 census, its population was 33, in 17 families.
