= Qusheh Laneh =

Qusheh Laneh قوشه لانه
- Village
- Location within Iran
- Coordinates: 36°46′47″N 49°49′10″E
- Country: Iran
- Province: Gilan
- County: Rudbar
- Bakhsh: Khorgam
- Rural District: Khorgam

Population (2016)
  - Total: 170
- Time zone: UTC+3:30 (IRST)

Qusheh Laneh (Persian: قوشه لانه, also Romanized as Qūsheh Lāneh; also known as Qūshlāneh) is a village in Khorgam Rural District, Khorgam District, Rudbar County, Gilan Province, Iran. At the 2016 census, its population was 170, in 59 families. Large increase from 73 people in 2006.
