= Makhshar =

mokhshahr مخشهر
- Village
- Location within Iran
- Coordinates: 36°50′02″N 49°34′29″E
- Country: Iran
- Province: Gilan
- County: Rudbar
- Bakhsh: Rahmatabad and Blukat
- Rural District: Dasht-e Veyl

Population (2016)
  - Total: 34
- Time zone: UTC+3:30 (IRST)

mokhshahr (Persian: مخشهر, also Romanized as Mokhshar; also known as Maḩchahr) is a village in Dasht-e Veyl Rural District, Rahmatabad and Blukat District, Rudbar County, Gilan Province, Iran. At the 2016 census, its population was 34, in 11 families. Down from 44 people in 2006.
