= Palang Darreh, Rudbar =

Palang Darreh پلنگ دره
- Village
- Location within Iran
- Coordinates: 36°51′17″N 49°37′40″E
- Country: Iran
- Province: Gilan
- County: Rudbar
- Bakhsh: Rahmatabad and Blukat
- Rural District: Dasht-e Veyl

Population (2016)
  - Total: 186
- Time zone: UTC+3:30 (IRST)

Palang Darreh (Persian: پلنگ دره, also Romanized as Palangdarreh) is a village in Dasht-e Veyl Rural District, Rahmatabad and Blukat District, Rudbar County, Gilan Province, Iran. At the 2016 census, its population was 186, in 60 families. Decreased from 301 people in 2006.
