= Sheykh Ali Tuseh =

Village in Gilan province, Iran

Sheykh Ali Tuseh Persian: شيخ علی توسه
- Village
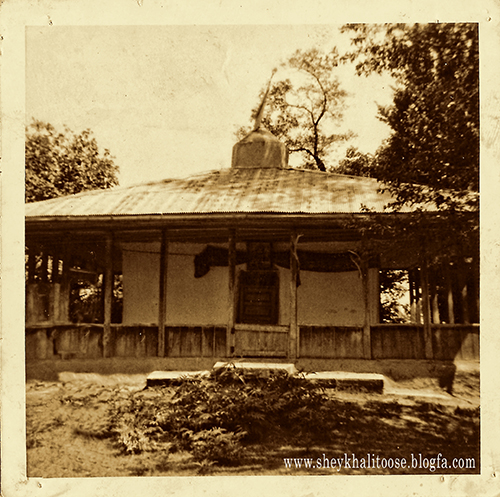
- A shrine in the village of Sheykh Ali Tuseh

- Location within Iran
- Coordinates: 37°03′53″N 49°42′01″E
- Country: Iran
- Province: Gilan
- County: Rudbar
- District: Rahmatabad and Blukat
- Rural District: Blukat

Population (2016)
  - Total: 379
- Time zone: UTC+3:30 (IRST)

Sheykh Ali Tuseh (Persian: شيخعلی توسه) (Note: Also romanized as Sheikh Ali Tooseh and Sheykh ‘Alī Ţūseh; also known as Shaghāltūsh, Shākaltūsh, and Shekhaltuse) is a village in Blukat Rural District of Rahmatabad and Blukat District in Rudbar County, Gilan province, Iran.

== Demographics ==
=== Population ===
At the time of the 2006 National Census, the village's population was 444 in 115 households. The following census in 2011 counted 393 people in 118 households. The 2016 census measured the population of the village as 379 people in 130 households.
