= Asia Barak =

Asia Barak or Asiabarak (Persian: اسيابرك) may refer to:

- Asia Barak, Rudbar
- Asiabarak, Siahkal
