= Sang Sarak =

Sang Sarak (Persian: سنگ سرك) may refer to:

- Sang Sarak, Gilan
- Sang Sarak, Mazandaran
- Sang Sarak, Savadkuh, Mazandaran Province
