= Ber Agur =

Village in Gilan province, Iran

Ber Agur Persian: براگور
- Village
- Location within Iran
- Coordinates: 37°00′24″N 49°37′11″E
- Country: Iran
- Province: Gilan
- County: Rudbar
- District: Rahmatabad and Blukat
- Rural District: Blukat

Population (2016)
  - Total: 465
- Time zone: UTC+3:30 (IRST)

Ber Agur (Persian: براگور) (Note: Also romanized as Bara Goor and Ber Āgūr; also known as Barāqūr, Berāgūr-e Bālā, and Berāgūr-e Pā’īn) is a village in Blukat Rural District of Rahmatabad and Blukat District in Rudbar County, Gilan province, Iran.

== Demographics ==
=== Population ===
At the time of the 2006 National Census, the village's population was 618 in 154 households. The following census in 2011 counted 551 people in 159 households. The 2016 census measured the population of the village as 465 people in 148 households.
