= Chichal =

Chichal چيچال
- Village
- Location within Iran
- Coordinates: 36°49′00″N 49°40′00″E
- Country: Iran
- Province: Gilan
- County: Rudbar
- Bakhsh: Khorgam
- Rural District: Khorgam

Population (2016)
  - Total: 74
- Time zone: UTC+3:30 (IRST)

Chichal (Persian: چيچال, also Romanized as Chīchāl) is a village in Khorgam Rural District, Khorgam District, Rudbar County, Gilan Province, Iran. At the 2016 census, its population was 74, in 25 families. Down from 112 people in 2006.
