= Chelvan Sara =

Chelvan Sara چلوانسرا
- Village
- Location within Iran
- Coordinates: 36°46′50″N 49°48′28″E
- Country: Iran
- Province: Gilan
- County: Rudbar
- Bakhsh: Khorgam
- Rural District: Khorgam

Population (2016)
  - Total: 87
- Time zone: UTC+3:30 (IRST)

Chelvan Sara (Persian: چلوانسرا, also Romanized as Chelvān Sarā; also known as Chalmansarā) is a village in Khorgam Rural District, Khorgam District, Rudbar County, Gilan Province, Iran. At the 2016 census, its population was 87, in 32families. Up from 66 people in 2006.
