= Chorreh, Gilan =

Village in Gilan province, Iran

Chorreh Persian: چره
- Village
- Location within Iran
- Coordinates: 36°50′11″N 49°36′21″E
- Country: Iran
- Province: Gilan
- County: Rudbar
- District: Rahmatabad and Blukat
- Rural District: Dasht-e Veyl

Population (2016)
  - Total: 430
- Time zone: UTC+3:30 (IRST)

Chorreh (Persian: چره) (Note: Also romanized as Choreh and Chorrah; also known as Chavareh, Chorā, and Churra) is a village in Dasht-e Veyl Rural District of Rahmatabad and Blukat District in Rudbar County, Gilan province, Iran. During the 1990 Manjil-Rudbar earthquake, the village served as a place to stay for people who lived near the earthquake.

== Demographics ==
=== Population ===
At the time of the 2006 National Census, the village's population was 504 in 115 households. The following census in 2011 counted 475 people in 126 households. The 2016 census measured the population of the village as 430 people in 142 households.
