= Jalal Deh =

Village in Gilan province, Iran

Jalal Deh Persian: جلالده
- Village
- Location within Iran
- Coordinates: 36°46′53″N 49°42′03″E
- Country: Iran
- Province: Gilan
- County: Rudbar
- District: Khurgam
- Rural District: Dolfak

Population (2016)
  - Total: 112
- Time zone: UTC+3:30 (IRST)

Jalal Deh (Persian: جلالده) (Note: Also romanized as Jalāl Deh) is a village in Dolfak Rural District of Khurgam District in Rudbar County, Gilan province, Iran.

== Demographics ==
=== Population ===
At the time of the 2006 National Census, the village's population was 87 in 26 households. The following census in 2011 counted 76 people in 25 households. The 2016 census measured the population of the village as 112 people in 38 households.
