= Kiaabad =

Kiaabad کیاآباد
- Village
- Location within Iran
- Coordinates: 36°52′02″N 49°31′10″E
- Country: Iran
- Province: Gilan
- County: Rudbar
- Bakhsh: Rahmatabad and Blukat
- Rural District: Rahmatabad

Population (2016)
  - Total: 197
- Time zone: UTC+3:30 (IRST)

Kiaabad (Persian: کیاآباد, also Romanized as Kīāābād; also known as Keyābād, Kīābād, Kīāhābād, and Kiāhābād) is a village in Rahmatabad Rural District, Rahmatabad and Blukat District, Rudbar County, Gilan Province, Iran.

At the time of the 2006 National Census, the village's population was 176 in 54 households. The following census in 2011 counted 179 people in 61 households. The 2016 census measured the population of the village as 197 people in 78 households.
