= Khaseh Kul =

Village in Gilan province, Iran

Khaseh Kul Persian: خاصه كول
- Village
- Location within Iran
- Coordinates: 36°50′08″N 49°32′21″E
- Country: Iran
- Province: Gilan
- County: Rudbar
- District: Rahmatabad and Blukat
- Rural District: Dasht-e Veyl

Population (2016)
  - Total: 411
- Time zone: UTC+3:30 (IRST)

Khaseh Kul (Persian: خاصه كول) (Note: Also romanized as Khāşeh Kūl) is a village in Dasht-e Veyl Rural District of Rahmatabad and Blukat District in Rudbar County, Gilan province, Iran.

== Demographics ==
=== Population ===
At the time of the 2006 National Census, the village's population was 283 in 86 households. The following census in 2011 counted 279 people in 98 households. The 2016 census measured the population of the village as 411 people in 141 households.
