= Dasht-e Veyl =

Village in Gilan province, Iran

Dasht-e Veyl Persian: دشتويل
- Village
- Location within Iran
- Coordinates: 36°50′48″N 49°35′36″E
- Country: Iran
- Province: Gilan
- County: Rudbar
- District: Rahmatabad and Blukat
- Rural District: Dasht-e Veyl

Population (2016)
  - Total: 360
- Time zone: UTC+3:30 (IRST)

Dasht-e Veyl (Persian: دشتويل) is a village in, and the capital of, Dasht-e Veyl Rural District in Rahmatabad and Blukat District of Rudbar County, Gilan province, Iran.

== Demographics ==
=== Population ===
At the time of the 2006 National Census, the village's population was 440 in 113 households. The following census in 2011 counted 445 people in 110 households. The 2016 census measured the population of the village as 360 people in 106 households.
