= Mashmian =

Village in Gilan province, Iran

Mashmian Persian: ماشميان
- Village
- Location within Iran
- Coordinates: 36°46′37″N 49°44′02″E
- Country: Iran
- Province: Gilan
- County: Rudbar
- District: Khurgam
- Rural District: Dolfak

Population (2016)
  - Total: 103
- Time zone: UTC+3:30 (IRST)

Mashmian (Persian: ماشميان) (Note: Also romanized as Māshmīān) is a village in Dolfak Rural District of Khurgam District in Rudbar County, Gilan province, Iran.

== Demographics ==
=== Population ===
At the time of the 2006 National Census, the village's population was 2,053 in 528 households. The following census in 2011 counted 2,047 people in 598 households. The 2016 census measured the population of the village as 103 people in 39 households.
