= Shahr-e Bijar =

Village in Gilan province, Iran

Shahr-e Bijar Persian: شهر بيجار
- Village
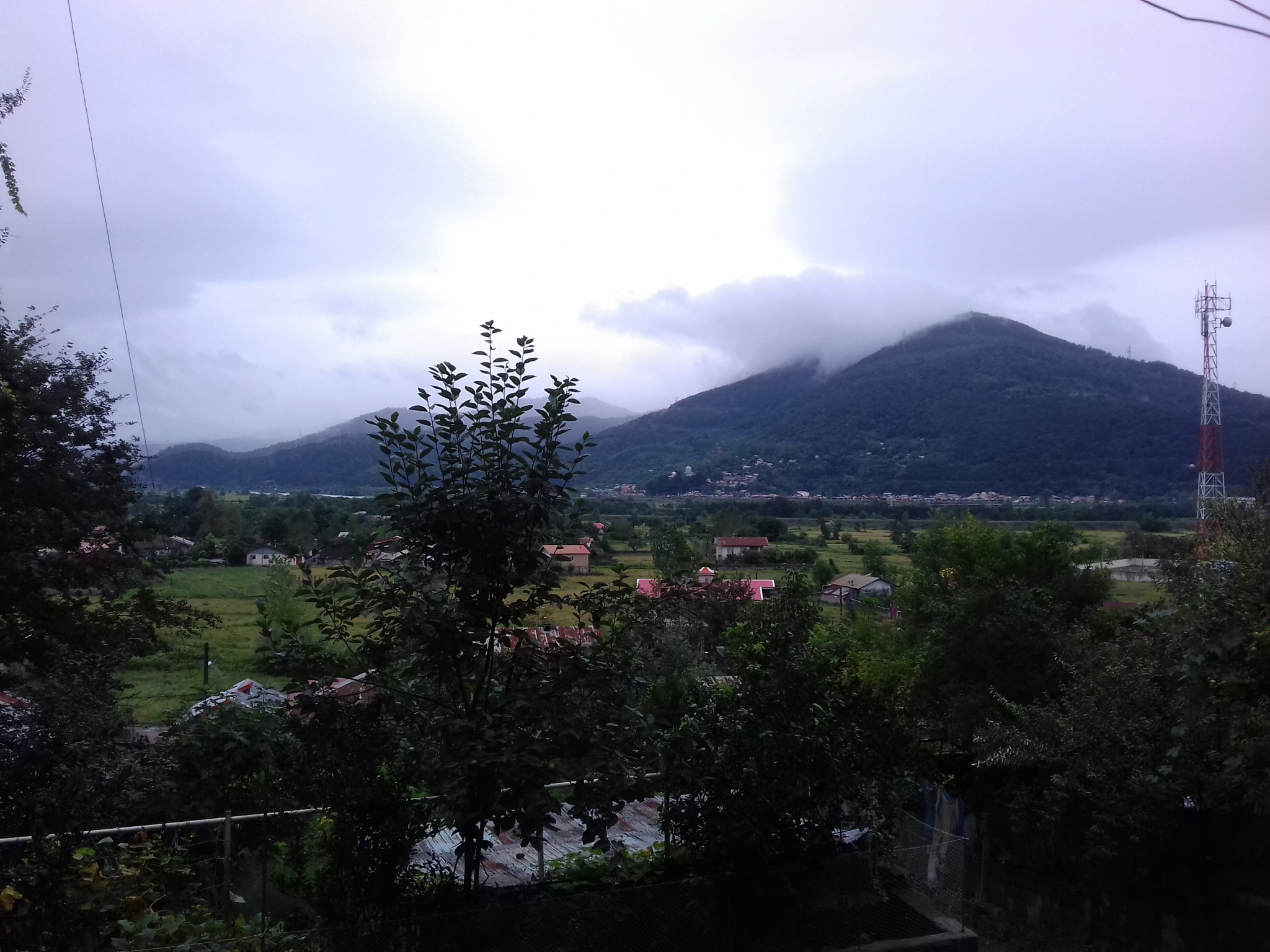
- The village of Shahr-e Bijar in 2017

- Location within Iran
- Coordinates: 37°00′45″N 49°38′28″E
- Country: Iran
- Province: Gilan
- County: Rudbar
- District: Rahmatabad and Blukat
- Rural District: Blukat

Population (2016)
  - Total: 877
- Time zone: UTC+3:30 (IRST)

Shahr-e Bijar (Persian: شهربيجار) (Note: Also romanized as Shahr-e Bījār; also known as Shahr-e Bījār Rūdsarā) is a village in, and the capital of, Blukat Rural District in Rahmatabad and Blukat District of Rudbar County, Gilan province, Iran.

== Demographics ==
=== Population ===
At the time of the 2006 National Census, the village's population was 894 in 232 households. The following census in 2011 counted 835 people in 272 households. The 2016 census measured the population of the village as 877 people in 285 households. It was the most populous village in its rural district.
