= Shah-e Shahidan, Gilan =

Shah-e Shahidan شاه شهيدان
- Village
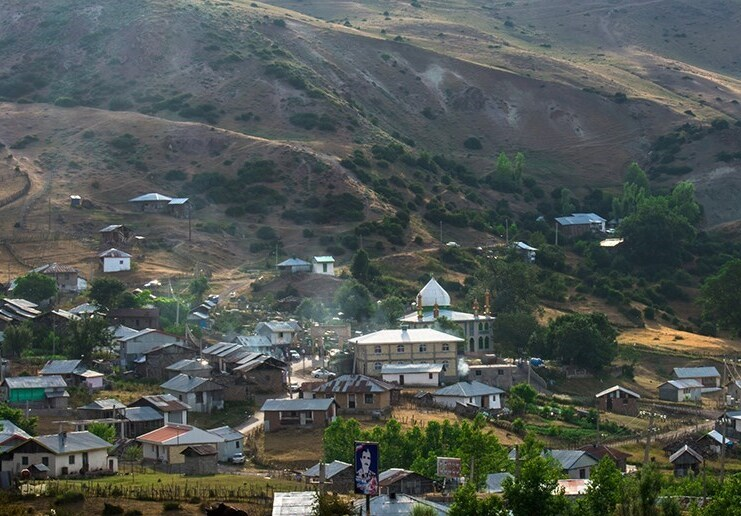
- Shah-e Shahidan

- Location within Iran
- Coordinates: 36°52′03″N 49°46′44″E
- Country: Iran
- Province: Gilan
- County: Rudbar
- Bakhsh: Khorgam
- Rural District: Khorgam

Population (2016)
  - Total: 118
- Time zone: UTC+3:30 (IRST)

Shah-e Shahidan (Persian: شاه شهيدان, also Romanized as Shāh-e Shahīdān and Shāh Shahīdān; also known as Shahīdān) is a village in Khorgam Rural District, Khorgam District, Rudbar County, Gilan Province, Iran. At the 2016 census, its population was 118, in 41 families. Up from 107 in 2006.
