= Anarkul =

Village in Gilan province, Iran

Anarkul Persian: اناركول
- Village
- Location within Iran
- Coordinates: 36°51′33″N 49°33′06″E
- Country: Iran
- Province: Gilan
- County: Rudbar
- District: Rahmatabad and Blukat
- Rural District: Rahmatabad

Population (2016)
  - Total: 218
- Time zone: UTC+3:30 (IRST)

Anarkul (Persian: اناركول) (Note: Also romanized as Anārkūl) is a village in Rahmatabad Rural District of Rahmatabad and Blukat District in Rudbar County, Gilan province, Iran.

== Demographics ==
=== Population ===
At the time of the 2006 National Census, the village's population was 181 in 63 households. The following census in 2011 counted 214 people in 61 households. The 2016 census measured the population of the village as 218 people in 69 households.
