= Now Deh, Khurgam =

Village in Gilan province, Iran

Now Deh Persian: نوده
- Village
- Location within Iran
- Coordinates: 36°48′25″N 49°46′25″E
- Country: Iran
- Province: Gilan
- County: Rudbar
- District: Khurgam
- Rural District: Khurgam

Population (2016)
  - Total: 496
- Time zone: UTC+3:30 (IRST)

Now Deh (Persian: نوده) (Note: Also romanized as Naudeh; also known as Naudekh) is a village in Khurgam Rural District of Khurgam District in Rudbar County, Gilan province, Iran.

== Demographics ==
=== Population ===
At the time of the 2006 National Census, the village's population was 725 in 215 households. The following census in 2011 counted 676 people in 207 households. The 2016 census measured the population of the village as 496 people in 181 households.
