= Lisin (disambiguation) =

Lisin was an ancient Sumerian goddess. Lisin may also refer to

- Lisin (surname)
- Lisen or Lisin, a village in Iran
