= Chalga Sar =

Village in Gilan province, Iran

Chalga Sar Persian: چلگاسر
- Village
- Location within Iran
- Coordinates: 36°49′22″N 49°37′21″E
- Country: Iran
- Province: Gilan
- County: Rudbar
- District: Rahmatabad and Blukat
- Rural District: Dasht-e Veyl

Population (2016)
  - Total: 541
- Time zone: UTC+3:30 (IRST)

Chalga Sar (Persian: چلگاسر) (Note: Also romanized as Chalgā Sar; also known as Chālkā Sar, Chalkāser, Chilkasar, and Chilkassar) is a village in Dasht-e Veyl Rural District of Rahmatabad and Blukat District in Rudbar County, Gilan province, Iran.

== Demographics ==
=== Population ===
At the time of the 2006 National Census, the village's population was 603 in 144 households. The following census in 2011 counted 499 people in 148 households. The 2016 census measured the population of the village as 541 people in 182 households.
