= Nesfi =

Village in Gilan province, Iran

Nesfi Persian: نصفی
- Village
- Location within Iran
- Coordinates: 36°50′44″N 49°30′07″E
- Country: Iran
- Province: Gilan
- County: Rudbar
- District: Rahmatabad and Blukat
- Rural District: Rahmatabad

Population (2016)
  - Total: 515
- Time zone: UTC+3:30 (IRST)

Nesfi (Persian: نصفی) (Note: Also romanized as Neşfī; also known as Nasabī and Nisfi) is a village in Rahmatabad Rural District of Rahmatabad and Blukat District in Rudbar County, Gilan province, Iran.

== Demographics ==
=== Population ===
At the time of the 2006 National Census, the village's population was 595 in 192 households. The following census in 2011 counted 551 people in 185 households. The 2016 census measured the population of the village as 515 people in 202 households.

== Archeology ==
In 1964 a series of burials were excavated near the village from two separate ancient burial grounds. The first dated from the early Iron Age to the Achaemenid Period, and the second from the Parthian period.
