= Seyqaldeh, Rudbar =

Seyqaldeh صيقلده
- Village
- Location within Iran
- Coordinates: 36°47′03″N 49°47′10″E
- Country: Iran
- Province: Gilan
- County: Rudbar
- Bakhsh: Khorgam
- Rural District: Khorgam

Population (2016)
  - Total: 88
- Time zone: UTC+3:30 (IRST)

Seyqaldeh (Persian: صيقلده, also Romanized as Şeyqaldeh and Seyqal Deh; also known as Şeqaldeh, Şeyqaldī, Sigaldi, and Sighaldi) is a village in Khorgam Rural District, Khorgam District, Rudbar County, Gilan Province, Iran. At the 2016 census, its population was 88, in 38 families. Down from 114 people in 2006.
