= Lafand Sara =

Lafand Sara لافندسرا
- Village
- Location within Iran
- Coordinates: 36°50′28″N 49°32′21″E
- Country: Iran
- Province: Gilan
- County: Rudbar
- Bakhsh: Rahmatabad and Blukat
- Rural District: Dasht-e Veyl

Population (2016)
  - Total: 101
- Time zone: UTC+3:30 (IRST)

Lafand Sara (Persian: لافندسرا, also Romanized as Lāfand Sarā; also known as Lāfan Sarā) is a village in Dasht-e Veyl Rural District, Rahmatabad and Blukat District, Rudbar County, Gilan Province, Iran. At the 2016 census, its population was 101, in 42 families. Up from 92 in 2006.
