= Rudkhaneh, Gilan =

Rudkhaneh رودخانه
- Village
- Location within Iran
- Coordinates: 36°49′44″N 49°35′29″E
- Country: Iran
- Province: Gilan
- County: Rudbar
- Bakhsh: Rahmatabad and Blukat
- Rural District: Dasht-e Veyl

Population (2016)
  - Total: 128
- Time zone: UTC+3:30 (IRST)

Rudkhaneh (Persian: رودخانه, also Romanized as Rūdkhāneh) is a village in Dasht-e Veyl Rural District, Rahmatabad and Blukat District, Rudbar County, Gilan Province, Iran. At the 2016 census, its population was 128, in 44 families. Up from 109 in 2006.
