= Heshmatabad, Gilan =

Village in Gilan province, Iran

Heshmatabad Persian: حشمت آباد
- Village
- Location within Iran
- Coordinates: 36°48′12″N 49°38′49″E
- Country: Iran
- Province: Gilan
- County: Rudbar
- District: Khurgam
- Rural District: Dolfak

Population (2016)
  - Total: 299
- Time zone: UTC+3:30 (IRST)

Heshmatabad (Persian: حشمت آباد) (Note: Also romanized as Ḩeshmatābād) is a village in Dolfak Rural District of Khurgam District in Rudbar County, Gilan province, Iran.

== Demographics ==
=== Population ===
At the time of the 2006 National Census, the village's population was 285 in 79 households. The following census in 2011 counted 274 people in 85 households. The 2016 census measured the population of the village as 299 people in 105 households.
