= Tiyeh =

Tiyeh تيه
- Village
- Interactive map of Tiyeh
- Coordinates: 36°46′38.7″N 49°46′0.79″E
- Country: Iran
- Province: Gilan
- County: Rudbar
- Bakhsh: Khorgam
- Rural District: Khorgam

Population (2016)
  - Total: 94
- Time zone: UTC+3:30 (IRST)

Tiyeh (Persian: تيه, also Romanized as Tīyeh) is a village in Khorgam Rural District, Khorgam District, Rudbar County, Gilan Province, Iran. At the 2006 census, its population was 109, in 29 families. In 2016, it had 94 people in 35 households.
