= Dafraz =

Village in Gilan province, Iran

Dafraz Persian: دفراز
- Village
- Location within Iran
- Coordinates: 36°51′04″N 49°37′13″E
- Country: Iran
- Province: Gilan
- County: Rudbar
- District: Rahmatabad and Blukat
- Rural District: Dasht-e Veyl

Population (2016)
  - Total: 304
- Time zone: UTC+3:30 (IRST)

Dafraz (Persian: دفراز) (Note: Also romanized as Dafrāz) is a village in Dasht-e Veyl Rural District of Rahmatabad and Blukat District in Rudbar County, Gilan province, Iran.

== Demographics ==
=== Population ===
At the time of the 2006 National Census, the village's population was 349 in 80 households. The following census in 2011 counted 287 people in 73 households. The 2016 census measured the population of the village as 304 people in 94 households.
