= Chehesh =

Village in Gilan province, Iran

Chehesh Persian: چهش
- Village
- Location within Iran
- Coordinates: 36°48′47″N 49°44′13″E
- Country: Iran
- Province: Gilan
- County: Rudbar
- District: Khurgam
- Rural District: Khurgam

Population (2016)
  - Total: 380
- Time zone: UTC+3:30 (IRST)

Chehesh (Persian: چهش) (Note: Also known as Chiyesh) is a village in Khurgam Rural District of Khurgam District in Rudbar County, Gilan province, Iran.

== Demographics ==
=== Population ===
At the time of the 2006 National Census, the village's population was 460 in 129 households. The following census in 2011 counted 361 people in 108 households. The 2016 census measured the population of the village as 380 people in 128 households.
