= Talakuh =

Talakuh طالكوه
- Village
- Location within Iran
- Coordinates: 36°48′45″N 49°42′03″E
- Country: Iran
- Province: Gilan
- County: Rudbar
- Bakhsh: Khorgam
- Rural District: Khorgam

Population (2016)
  - Total: 226
- Time zone: UTC+3:30 (IRST)

Talakuh (Persian: طالكوه, also Romanized as Ţālakūh; also known as Talakukh and Tāleh Kūh) is a village in Khorgam Rural District, Khorgam District, Rudbar County, Gilan Province, Iran. At the 2016 census, its population was 226, in 79 families. Up from 208 in 2006.
