= Pasin Darreh =

Pasin Darreh پسيندره
- Village
- Location within Iran
- Coordinates: 36°51′23″N 49°35′26″E
- Country: Iran
- Province: Gilan
- County: Rudbar
- Bakhsh: Rahmatabad and Blukat
- Rural District: Dasht-e Veyl

Population (2016)
  - Total: 65
- Time zone: UTC+3:30 (IRST)

Pasin Darreh (Persian: پسيندره, also Romanized as Pasīn Darreh; also known as Pasandār and Pasandara) is a village in Dasht-e Veyl Rural District, Rahmatabad and Blukat District, Rudbar County, Gilan Province, Iran. At the 2016 census, its population was 65, consisting of 24 families. Decreased from 103 people in 2006.
