= Rajun =

Village in Gilan province, Iran

Rajun Persian: راجعون
- Village
- Location within Iran
- Coordinates: 36°51′45″N 49°36′31″E
- Country: Iran
- Province: Gilan
- County: Rudbar
- District: Rahmatabad and Blukat
- Rural District: Dasht-e Veyl

Population (2016)
  - Total: 223
- Time zone: UTC+3:30 (IRST)

Rajun (Persian: راجعون) (Note: Also romanized as Rāj‘ūn) is a village in Dasht-e Veyl Rural District of Rahmatabad and Blukat District in Rudbar County, Gilan province, Iran.

== Demographics ==
=== Population ===
At the time of the 2006 National Census, the village's population was 347 in 92 households. The following census in 2011 counted 288 people in 84 households. The 2016 census measured the population of the village as 223 people in 85 households.
