= Vailjar =

Vailjar وليجار
- Village
- Location within Iran
- Coordinates: 36°50′14″N 49°32′56″E
- Country: Iran
- Province: Gilan
- County: Rudbar
- Bakhsh: Rahmatabad and Blukat
- Rural District: Dasht-e Veyl

Population (2016)
  - Total: 55
- Time zone: UTC+3:30 (IRST)

Vailjar (Persian: وليجار, also Romanized as Valījār; also known as Valjār) is a village in Dasht-e Veyl Rural District, Rahmatabad and Blukat District, Rudbar County, Gilan Province, Iran. At the 2016 census, its population was 55, in 18 families. Up from 50 in 2006.
