= Dowsaledeh =

Village in Gilan province, Iran

Dowsaledeh Persian: دوسالده
- Village
- Location within Iran
- Coordinates: 36°46′47″N 49°46′11″E
- Country: Iran
- Province: Gilan
- County: Rudbar
- District: Khurgam
- Rural District: Khurgam

Population (2016)
  - Total: 337
- Time zone: UTC+3:30 (IRST)

Dowsaledeh (Persian: دوسالده) (Note: Also romanized as Dowsāledeh; also known as Do Sāleh Deh, Dowsāleh Deh, and Dusaladi) is a village in Khurgam Rural District of Khurgam District in Rudbar County, Gilan province, Iran.

== Demographics ==
=== Population ===
At the time of the 2006 National Census, the village's population was 458 in 130 households. The following census in 2011 counted 375 people in 120 households. The 2016 census measured the population of the village as 337 people in 132 households.
