= Seyyedan, Gilan =

Seyyedan سيدان
- Village
- Location within Iran
- Coordinates: 36°48′59″N 49°35′19″E
- Country: Iran
- Province: Gilan
- County: Rudbar
- Bakhsh: Rahmatabad and Blukat
- Rural District: Dasht-e Veyl

Population (2016)
  - Total: 187
- Time zone: UTC+3:30 (IRST)

Seyyedan (Persian: سيدان, also Romanized as Sayyedān, Saidan, Saydan, and Seyyedān) is a village in Dasht-e Veyl Rural District, Rahmatabad and Blukat District, Rudbar County, Gilan Province, Iran. At the 2016 census, its population was 187, in 63 families. Down from 194 in 2006.
