= Estakhrgah =

Estakhrgah استخرگاه
- Village
- Location within Iran
- Coordinates: 36°52′59″N 49°38′34″E
- Country: Iran
- Province: Gilan
- County: Rudbar
- Bakhsh: Rahmatabad and Blukat
- Rural District: Dasht-e Veyl

Population (2016)
  - Total: 185
- Time zone: UTC+3:30 (IRST)

Estakhrgah (Persian: استخرگاه, also Romanized as Estakhrgāh) is a village in Dasht-e Veyl Rural District, Rahmatabad and Blukat District, Rudbar County, Gilan Province, Iran. At the 2016 census, its population was 185, in 59 families. Down from 213 people in 2006.
