= Divrash =

Village in Gilan province, Iran

Divrash Persian: ديورش
- Village
- Location within Iran
- Coordinates: 36°53′56″N 49°34′48″E
- Country: Iran
- Province: Gilan
- County: Rudbar
- District: Rahmatabad and Blukat
- Rural District: Rahmatabad

Population (2016)
  - Total: 210
- Time zone: UTC+3:30 (IRST)

Divrash (Persian: ديورش) (Note: Also romanized as Dīvrash) is a village in Rahmatabad Rural District of Rahmatabad and Blukat District in Rudbar County, Gilan province, Iran.

== Demographics ==
=== Population ===
At the time of the 2006 National Census, the village's population was 262 in 69 households. The following census in 2011 counted 210 people in 64 households. The 2016 census measured the population of the village as 210 people in 75 households.
