= Shahran, Gilan =

Village in Gilan province, Iran

Shahran Persian: شهران
- Village
- Location within Iran
- Coordinates: 36°56′16″N 49°33′37″E
- Country: Iran
- Province: Gilan
- County: Rudbar
- District: Rahmatabad and Blukat
- Rural District: Rahmatabad

Population (2016)
  - Total: 204
- Time zone: UTC+3:30 (IRST)

Shahran (Persian: شهران) (Note: Also romanized as Shahrān; also known as Shārān and Shiaran) is a village in Rahmatabad Rural District of Rahmatabad and Blukat District in Rudbar County, Gilan province, Iran.

== Demographics ==
=== Population ===
At the time of the 2006 National Census, the village's population was 330 in 93 households. The following census in 2011 counted 252 people in 79 households. The 2016 census measured the population of the village as 204 people in 73 households.

== Archeology ==
Just north of Shahran is the archeological site of Lameh-Zamin, identified as an iron age cemetery.
