= Poshtehan =

Village in Gilan province, Iran

Poshtehan Persian: پشتهان
- Village
- Location within Iran
- Coordinates: 36°51′22″N 49°35′56″E
- Country: Iran
- Province: Gilan
- County: Rudbar
- District: Rahmatabad and Blukat
- Rural District: Dasht-e Veyl

Population (2016)
  - Total: 260
- Time zone: UTC+3:30 (IRST)

Poshtehan (Persian: پشتهان) (Note: Also romanized as Poshtahān and Poshtehān; also known as Poshtān, Poshtehān-e Bozorg, Pushtagan, and Pushtān) is a village in Dasht-e Veyl Rural District of Rahmatabad and Blukat District in Rudbar County, Gilan province, Iran.

== Demographics ==
=== Population ===
At the time of the 2006 National Census, the village's population was 332 in 82 households. The following census in 2011 counted 166 people in 81 households. The 2016 census measured the population of the village as 260 people in 92 households.
