= Estalkh Kuh =

Estalkh Kuh اسطلخ كوه
- Village
- Location within Iran
- Coordinates: 36°48′00″N 49°48′00″E
- Country: Iran
- Province: Gilan
- County: Rudbar
- Bakhsh: Khorgam
- Rural District: Khorgam

Population (2016)
  - Total: 161
- Time zone: UTC+3:30 (IRST)

Estalkh Kuh (Persian: اسطلخ كوه, also Romanized as Estalkh Kūh and Esţalkh Kūh; also known as Estakhr Kuh, Estalkūh, Estel Kūh, Istakhlku, and Salākhūn) is a village in Khorgam Rural District, Khorgam District, Rudbar County, Gilan Province, Iran. At the 2006 census, its population was 213, in 70 families. In 2016, it had 161 people in 75 households.
