= Div Rud =

Div Rud (Persian: ديورود) may refer to:

- Div Rud, Rudbar
- Div Rud, Rudsar
