= Liavol =

Liavol or Liaval or Liawal or Liyavol or Layavol (Persian: لياول), also rendered as Liava , may refer to:

- Liavol-e Olya
- Liavol-e Sofla
