= Poshteh Kolah =

Village in Gilan province, Iran

Poshteh Kolah Persian: پشته كلاه
- Village
- Location within Iran
- Coordinates: 36°47′27″N 49°45′21″E
- Country: Iran
- Province: Gilan
- County: Rudbar
- District: Khurgam
- Rural District: Khurgam

Population (2016)
  - Total: 506
- Time zone: UTC+3:30 (IRST)

Poshteh Kolah (Persian: پشته كلاه) (Note: Also romanized as Poshteh Kolāh; also known as Posht Kolā, Posht Kolāh, Posht Qal‘eh, Poshteh Kolā, Pusht-Kala, and Pusht Qal‘eh) is a village in Khurgam Rural District of Khurgam District in Rudbar County, Gilan province, Iran.

== Demographics ==
=== Population ===
At the time of the 2006 National Census, the village's population was 532 in 141 households. The following census in 2011 counted 578 people in 170 households. The 2016 census measured the population of the village as 506 people in 166 households.
