= Naveh, Khorgam =

Naveh ناوه
- Village
- Location within Iran
- Coordinates: 36°50′56″N 49°43′38″E
- Country: Iran
- Province: Gilan
- County: Rudbar
- Bakhsh: Khorgam
- Rural District: Khorgam

Population (2006)
  - Total: 15
- Time zone: UTC+3:30 (IRST)

Naveh (Persian: ناوه, also Romanized as Nāveh) is a village in Khorgam Rural District, Khorgam District, Rudbar County, Gilan Province, Iran. At the 2006 census, its population was 15, in 4 families. In 2016, it had less than 4 households and its population was not reported.
