= Hajji Deh =

Hajji Deh حاجی ده
- Village
- Location within Iran
- Coordinates: 36°49′07″N 49°36′44″E
- Country: Iran
- Province: Gilan
- County: Rudbar
- Bakhsh: Rahmatabad and Blukat
- Rural District: Dasht-e Veyl

Population (2016)
  - Total: 105
- Time zone: UTC+3:30 (IRST)

Hajji Deh (Persian: حاجی ده, also Romanized as Ḩājjī Deh; also known as Ḩājad and Khadzhidy) is a village in Dasht-e Veyl Rural District, Rahmatabad and Blukat District, Rudbar County, Gilan Province, Iran. At the 2006 census, its population was 137, in 45 families. Down to 105 people in 2016, in 46 families.
