= Cheleh Bar =

Cheleh Bar چله بر
- Village
- Location within Iran
- Coordinates: 36°51′06″N 49°33′59″E
- Country: Iran
- Province: Gilan
- County: Rudbar
- Bakhsh: Rahmatabad and Blukat
- Rural District: Dasht-e Veyl

Population (2016)
  - Total: 147
- Time zone: UTC+3:30 (IRST)

Cheleh Bar (Persian: چله بر; also known as Chelehvar) is a village in Dasht-e Veyl Rural District, Rahmatabad and Blukat District, Rudbar County, Gilan Province, Iran. At the 2016 census, its population was 147, in 51 families.
