= Chahar Mahal, Gilan =

Village in Gilan province, Iran

Chahar Mahal Persian: چهار محل
- Village
- Location within Iran
- Coordinates: 36°46′38″N 49°43′32″E
- Country: Iran
- Province: Gilan
- County: Rudbar
- District: Khurgam
- Rural District: Dolfak

Population (2016)
  - Total: 1,168
- Time zone: UTC+3:30 (IRST)

Chahar Mahal (Persian: چهار محل) (Note: Also romanized as Chahār Maḩāl) is a village in, and the capital of, Dolfak Rural District in Khurgam District of Rudbar County, Gilan province, Iran.

== Demographics ==
=== Population ===
At the time of the 2016 National Census, the village's population was 1,168 people in 396 households. It was the most populous village in its rural district.
