= Lisen =

Lisen ليسن
- village
- Location within Iran
- Coordinates: 36°54′48″N 49°33′17″E
- Country: Iran
- Province: Gilan
- County: Rudbar
- Bakhsh: Rahmatabad and Blukat
- Rural District: Rahmatabad

Population (2016)
  - Total: 168
- Time zone: UTC+3:30 (IRST)

Lisen (Persian: ليسن, also Romanized as Līsen; also known as Līsīn) is a village in Rahmatabad Rural District, Rahmatabad and Blukat District, Rudbar County, Gilan Province, Iran.

At the time of the 2006 National Census, the village's population was 220 in 60 households. The following census in 2011 counted 209 people in 61 households. The 2016 census measured the population of the village as 168 people in 58 households.
