= Sibon =

Village in Gilan province, Iran

Sibon Persian: سيبن
- Village
- Location within Iran
- Coordinates: 36°49′15″N 49°44′25″E
- Country: Iran
- Province: Gilan
- County: Rudbar
- District: Khurgam
- Rural District: Khurgam

Population (2016)
  - Total: 537
- Time zone: UTC+3:30 (IRST)

Sibon (Persian: سيبن) (Note: Also romanized as Sībon; also known as Sībon-e Bālā, Sībon-e ‘Olyā, and Sībūn) is a village in Khurgam Rural District of Khurgam District in Rudbar County, Gilan province, Iran.

== Demographics ==
=== Population ===
At the time of the 2006 National Census, the village's population was 428 in 130 households. The following census in 2011 counted 543 people in 179 households. The 2016 census measured the population of the village as 537 people in 190 households. It was the most populous village in its rural district.
