= Sondos =

Sondos سندس
- Village
- Location within Iran
- Coordinates: 36°52′34″N 49°32′31″E
- Country: Iran
- Province: Gilan
- County: Rudbar
- Bakhsh: Rahmatabad and Blukat
- Rural District: Rahmatabad

Population (2016)
  - Total: 151
- Time zone: UTC+3:30 (IRST)

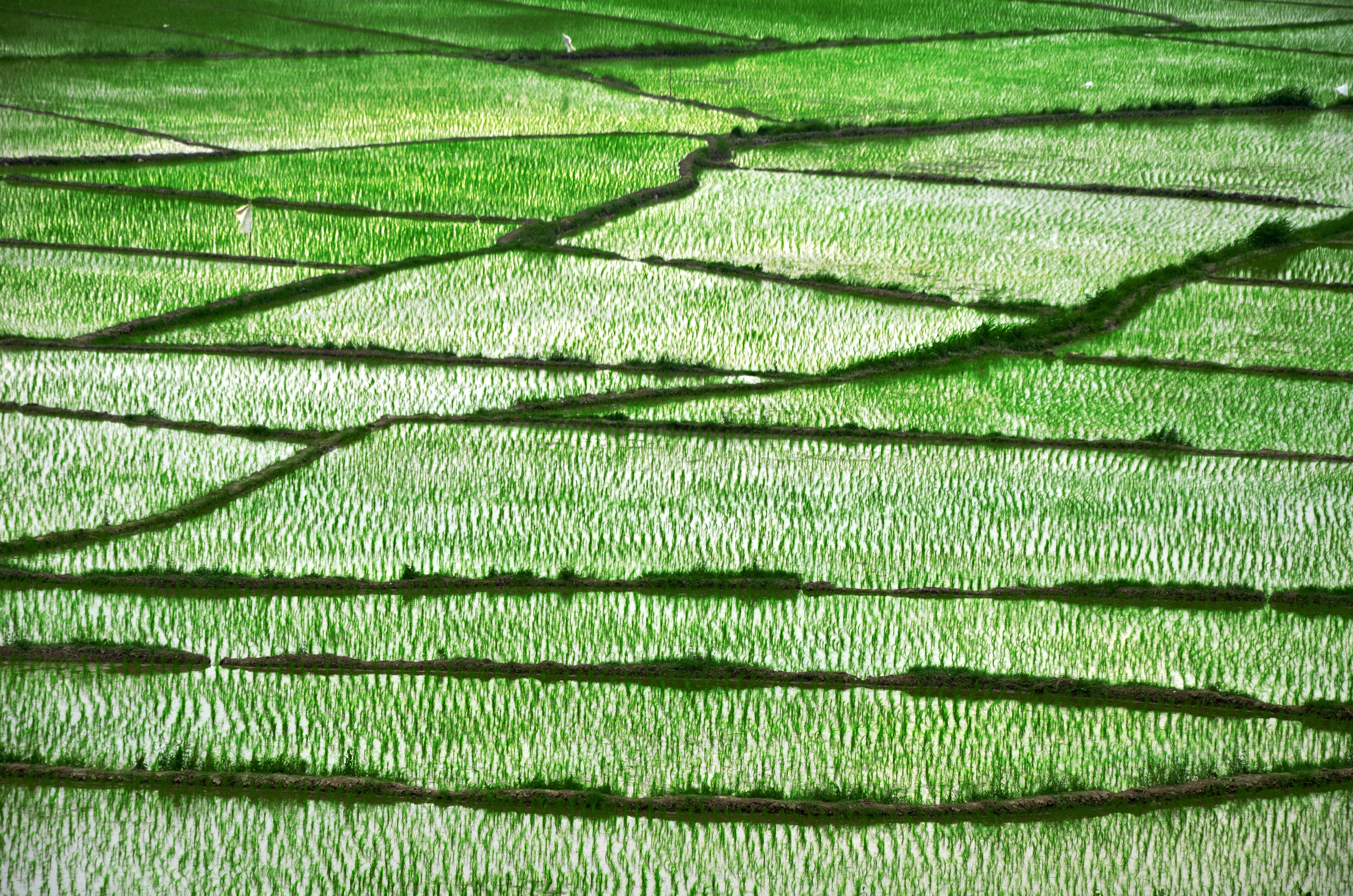
Rice fields in Sondos

Sondos (Persian: سندس, also Romanized as Sandas and Sendes, is a village in Rudbar County, of Gilan Province of Iran. Its population at the 2016 census was 151 people in 63 households.
