= Sang Sarak, Gilan =

Sang Sarak سنگ سرک
- Village
- Location within Iran
- Coordinates: 36°48′29″N 49°48′18″E
- Country: Iran
- Province: Gilan
- County: Rudbar
- Bakhsh: Khorgam
- Rural District: Khorgam

Population (2016)
  - Total: 74
- Time zone: UTC+3:30 (IRST)

Sang Sarak (Persian: سنگ سرک) is a village in Khorgam Rural District, Khorgam District, Rudbar County, Gilan Province, Iran. At the 2016 census, its population was 74, in 30 families. Increased from 34 people in 2006.
