= Vishan, Iran =

Village in Gilan province, Iran

Vishan Persian: ويشان
- Village
- Location within Iran
- Coordinates: 36°47′48″N 49°38′58″E
- Country: Iran
- Province: Gilan
- County: Rudbar
- District: Khurgam
- Rural District: Dolfak

Population (2016)
  - Total: 153
- Time zone: UTC+3:30 (IRST)

Vishan (Persian: ويشان) (Note: Also romanized as Vīshān) is a village in Dolfak Rural District of Khurgam District in Rudbar County, Gilan province, Iran.

== Demographics ==
=== Population ===
At the time of the 2006 National Census, the village's population was 24 in seven households. The following census in 2011 counted 157 people in 47 households. The 2016 census measured the population of the village as 153 people in 51 households.
