= Chak, Iran =

Chak (Persian: چك or چاك) in Iran may refer to:

- Chak, Gilan (چاك - Chāk)
- Chak, South Khorasan (چك - Chak')
