= Rudabad, Gilan =

Rudabad رودآباد
- Village
- Location within Iran
- Coordinates: 36°52′26″N 49°30′54″E
- Country: Iran
- Province: Gilan
- County: Rudbar
- Bakhsh: Rahmatabad and Blukat
- Rural District: Rahmatabad

Population (2016)
  - Total: 63
- Time zone: UTC+3:30 (IRST)

Rudabad (Persian: رودآباد, also Romanized as Rūdābād) is a village in Rahmatabad Rural District, Rahmatabad and Blukat District, Rudbar County, Gilan Province, Iran.

At the time of the 2006 National Census, the village's population was 114 in 32 households. The following census in 2011 counted 65 people in 22 households. The 2016 census measured the population of the village as 63 people in 21 households.
