= Liavol-e Olya =

Village in Gilan province, Iran

Liavol-e Olya Persian: لياول عليا
- Village
- Location within Iran
- Coordinates: 36°46′27″N 49°42′48″E
- Country: Iran
- Province: Gilan
- County: Rudbar
- District: Khurgam
- Rural District: Dolfak

Population (2016)
  - Total: 182
- Time zone: UTC+3:30 (IRST)

Liavol-e Olya (Persian: لياول عليا) (Note: Also romanized as Līāvol-e ‘Olyā and Liyavol Olya; also known as Līāvā Bālā, Liavalbala, Līāvol Bālā, Līāvol-e Bālā, and Liāwalbāla) is a village in Dolfak Rural District of Khurgam District in Rudbar County, Gilan province, Iran.

== Demographics ==
=== Population ===
At the time of the 2006 National Census, the village's population was 303 in 92 households. The following census in 2011 counted 173 people in 61 households. The 2016 census measured the population of the village as 182 people in 73 households.
