= Div Rud, Rudbar =

Div Rud ديورود
- Village
- Location within Iran
- Coordinates: 36°52′06″N 49°33′36″E
- Country: Iran
- Province: Gilan
- County: Rudbar
- Bakhsh: Rahmatabad and Blukat
- Rural District: Rahmatabad

Population (2016)
  - Total: 118
- Time zone: UTC+3:30 (IRST)

Div Rud (Persian: ديورود, also Romanized as Dīv Rūd; also known as Divaru, Dīveh Rūd, and Dīwāru) is a village in Rahmatabad Rural District, Rahmatabad and Blukat District, Rudbar County, Gilan Province, Iran.

At the time of the 2006 National Census, the village's population was 116. The following census in 2011 counted 104 people in 30 households. The 2016 census measured the population of the village as 118 people in 44 households.
