= Kopa =

Kopa or KOPA may refer to:

== Places ==
- Kopa, Estonia, village in Hiiu Parish, Hiiu County, Estonia
- Kopa, Iran, village in Gilan Province, Iran
- Lake Kopa, lake in Akmola Province, Kazakhstan

== Radio and television stations ==
- KOPA-CD, a low-power television station (channel 9, virtual 12) licensed to serve Gillette, Wyoming, United States
- KPRI, a radio station (91.3 FM) licensed to serve Pala, California, United States, which held the call sign KOPA from 2009 to 2018
- KSLX-FM, a radio station (100.7 FM) licensed to Scottsdale, Arizona, United States, which held the call sign KOPA from 1978 to 1986

== People with the surname ==
- Jerzy Kopa (born 1943), Polish football player
- Raymond Kopa (1931−2017), French football player
- Matt Kopa (born 1987), American football player

== Other uses ==
- BOPA (Borgerlige Partisaner), a Danish resistance movement
- Kopa (The Lion King), a character from the series The Lion King
- Kopa (number), a medieval unit of amount equal to 60
- Kadua cordata, a Hawaiian plant
- Kopa, Silesian dessert
