= Liavol-e Sofla =

Village in Gilan province, Iran

Liavol-e Sofla Persian: لياول سفلی
- Village
- Location within Iran
- Coordinates: 36°47′15″N 49°42′14″E
- Country: Iran
- Province: Gilan
- County: Rudbar
- District: Khurgam
- Rural District: Dolfak

Population (2016)
  - Total: 59
- Time zone: UTC+3:30 (IRST)

Liavol-e Sofla (Persian: لياول سفلی) (Note: Also romanized as Līāvol-e Soflá; also known as Layāvol Pā’īn, Liavalpain, Līāvol Pā’īn, Līāvol-e Pā’īn, and Līāwalpāīn) is a village in Dolfak Rural District of Khurgam District in Rudbar County, Gilan province, Iran.

== Demographics ==
=== Population ===
At the time of the 2006 National Census, the village's population was 66 in 20 households. The following census in 2011 counted 45 people in 17 households. The 2016 census measured the population of the village as 59 people in 22 households.
