= Chak, Gilan =

Chak چاک
- Village
- Location within Iran
- Coordinates: 36°51′28″N 49°35′10″E
- Country: Iran
- Province: Gilan
- County: Rudbar
- Bakhsh: Rahmatabad and Blukat
- Rural District: Dasht-e Veyl

Population (2006)
  - Total: 129
- Time zone: UTC+3:30 (IRST)

Chak (Persian: چاک, also Romanized as Chāk) is a village in Dasht-e Veyl Rural District, Rahmatabad and Blukat District, Rudbar County, Gilan Province, Iran. At the 2016 census, its population was 129, in 47 families. Decreased from 178 people in 2006.
