= Vishan =

Vishan may refer to:

- Vishan, Iran
- Vishan, Sofia Province, Bulgaria
