= Ispahbudhan Castle =

Castle in Gilan Province, Iran

Ispahbudhan castle
- قلعه اسپهبدان

General information
- Type: Castle
- Location: Rudbar County, Iran

Ispahbudhan castle (Persian: قلعه اسپهبدان) is a historical castle located in Rudbar County in Gilan Province, The longevity of this fortress dates back to the Nizari Ismaili state.
