= Rudabad =

Rudabad (Persian: روداباد) may refer to:

- Rudabad, Gilan
- Rudabad, Isfahan
