= Halimeh Jan =

Village in Gilan province, Iran

Halimeh Jan Persian: حليمه جان
- Village
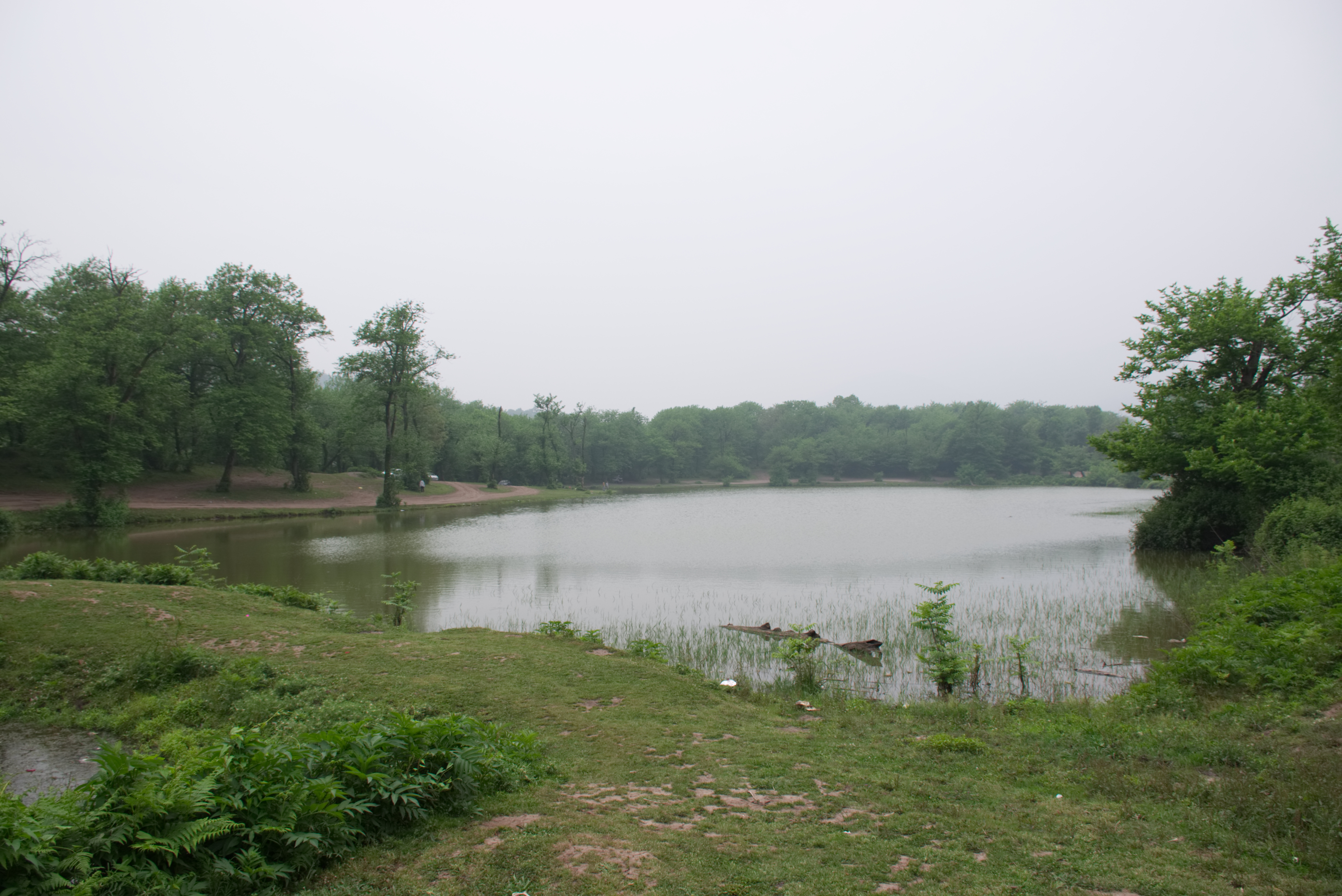
- Halimeh Jan Lake

- Location within Iran
- Coordinates: 36°58′00″N 49°34′20″E
- Country: Iran
- Province: Gilan
- County: Rudbar
- District: Rahmatabad and Blukat
- Rural District: Blukat

Population (2016)
  - Total: 622
- Time zone: UTC+3:30 (IRST)

Halimeh Jan (Persian: حليمه جان) (Note: Also romanized as Ḩalīmeh Jān; also known as Halīmjān and Khalimdzhakh) is a village in Blukat Rural District of Rahmatabad and Blukat District in Rudbar County, Gilan province, Iran.

== Demographics ==
=== Population ===
At the time of the 2006 National Census, the village's population was 741 in 176 households. The following census in 2011 counted 717 people in 199 households. The 2016 census measured the population of the village as 622 people in 200 households.
