= Gupol =

Village in Gilan province, Iran

Gupol Persian: گوپل
- Village
- Location within Iran
- Coordinates: 36°48′15″N 49°45′08″E
- Country: Iran
- Province: Gilan
- County: Rudbar
- District: Khurgam
- Rural District: Khurgam

Population (2016)
  - Total: 371
- Time zone: UTC+3:30 (IRST)

Gupol (Persian: گوپل) (Note: Also romanized as Gūpol; also known as Goofol, Gopul, Gūfel, Gūfol, Gupa, and Kopā) is a village in Khurgam Rural District of Khurgam District in Rudbar County, Gilan province, Iran.

== Demographics ==
=== Population ===
At the time of the 2006 National Census, the village's population was 328 in 102 households. The following census in 2011 counted 311 people in 91 households. The 2016 census measured the population of the village as 371 people in 128 households.
