= Asia Barak, Rudbar =

Village in Iran

Asia Barak آسیابرک
- Village
- Location within Iran
- Coordinates: 36°48′15″N 49°45′09″E
- Country: Iran
- Province: Gilan
- County: Rudbar
- Bakhsh: Khorgam
- Rural District: Khorgam

Population (2006)
  - Total: 12
- Time zone: UTC+3:30 (IRST)

Asia Barak (Persian: آسیابرک, also Romanized as Āsīā Barak and Āsīābarak) is a village in Khorgam Rural District, Khorgam District, Rudbar County, Gilan Province, Iran. At the 2006 census, its population was 12, in 4 families. In 2016, it had less than 4 households and its population was not reported.
