= Rashi, Iran =

Village in Gilan province, Iran

Rashi Persian: رشی
- Village
- Location within Iran
- Coordinates: 36°50′36″N 49°38′31″E
- Country: Iran
- Province: Gilan
- County: Rudbar
- District: Rahmatabad and Blukat
- Rural District: Dasht-e Veyl

Population (2016)
  - Total: 696
- Time zone: UTC+3:30 (IRST)

Rashi (Persian: رشی) (Note: Also romanized as Rashī and Reshi) is a village in Dasht-e Veyl Rural District of Rahmatabad and Blukat District in Rudbar County, Gilan province, Iran.

== Demographics ==
=== Population ===
At the time of the 2006 National Census, the village's population was 610 in 179 households. The following census in 2011 counted 523 people in 175 households. The 2016 census measured the population of the village as 696 people in 232 households. It was the most populous village in its rural district.
