= Halima Idris Salim =

Sudanese journalist (1994–2023)

- حليمة إدريس سالم
- Born: 1994; Ombadda, Khartoum State, Sudan
- Died: 10 October 2023 (aged 28–29); Ombadda, Khartoum State, Sudan
- Cause of death: Run over by a RSF vehicle
- Resting place: Al-Harah 52 cemetery, Ombadda
- Education: Sudan Academy for Communication Studies
- Occupation: Journalist
- Years active: 2013–2023
- Employer: Sudan Bukra
- Known for: Reporting on the Sudanese civil war

Halima Idris Salim (Arabic: حليمة إدريس سالم; c. 1994 – 10 October 2023) was a Sudanese journalist, known for her reporting on her hometown of Omdurman. She was killed while reporting on the Sudanese civil war when she was run over by a military vehicle owned by the Rapid Support Forces during the Battle of Khartoum.

== Career ==
Salim was born and raised in Ombadda, a suburb of Omdurman. Salim studied at the Sudan Academy for Communication Studies before working as a journalist from 2013, initially for the sports radio station Arriadia FM and later for the online radio station Radio Fikra.

Salim worked for the independent online news outlet Sudan Bukra, a pro-opposition organisation based in the United Kingdom, from November 2022. She was described as, alongside her colleagues, "conveying the reality of a country in crisis after the ill-fated coup". Prior to the war, she primarily covered Umbada, the area she was from. She had covered the Sudanese civil war and the conflict between the Sudanese Armed Forces and the Rapid Support Forces since the conflict broke out on 15 April 2023, in particular the work of volunteers trying to help the civilian population affected by the conflict. She had initially left Omdurman with other Sudan Bukra journalists before choosing to return to continue her coverage of the city, contributing a piece collating testimonies from the families of victims of the conflict at the besieged Bashaer Hospital.

== Death ==
Salim was killed on 10 October 2023 when she was run over by a military vehicle owned by the Rapid Support Forces, at the age of 29. At the time of her death, she was reporting on the condition of the emergency department of the Al Nao Hospital in Ombadda, which had experienced significant shelling the previous day, killing four. Salim and a friend had been run over by the vehicle while crossing the road to reach the hospital; Salim died of multiple fractures, while her friend survived. Salim was buried later that day at Al-Harah 52 cemetery in Umbada; her body was unable to be buried at the local cemetery, Hamad al-Nil, due to the area being under siege from the Rapid Support Forces.

As of 30 October 2023, no criminal investigation had been opened into Salim's death. Her family stated they were unable to take legal action due to the area being under the control of the Rapid Support Forces.

== Response ==
The Committee to Protect Journalists called for an investigation into Salim's death. Audrey Azoulay, the Director-General of UNESCO, condemned Salim's killing and called on all authorities operating in Sudan to ensure the safety of journalists reporting on the conflict, as well as identifying and prosecuting Salim's killers. Reporters Without Borders called for Salim's killers to be brought to justice. The Sudanese Journalists Network issued a statement reporting that Salim was "killed in the course of carrying out her professional duties", describing her as "committed to the issues of her country and its people" and accusing parties involved in the civil war of "systematically targeting journalists and media workers". The Coalition For Women In Journalism stated it was "devastated" at Salim's death, expressing its condolences for her family and calling for a transparent investigation into her death. Sudan Bukra released a statement calling for an investigation into Salim's death, saying that she had performed her "sacred media duty in the circumstances of this damned war"; its founder, Mutwakil Abdul Mageid, described Salim as a "very courageous individual who saw no limitations".
