= Barehsar =

City in Gilan province, Iran

Barehsar Persian: بره‌سر
- City
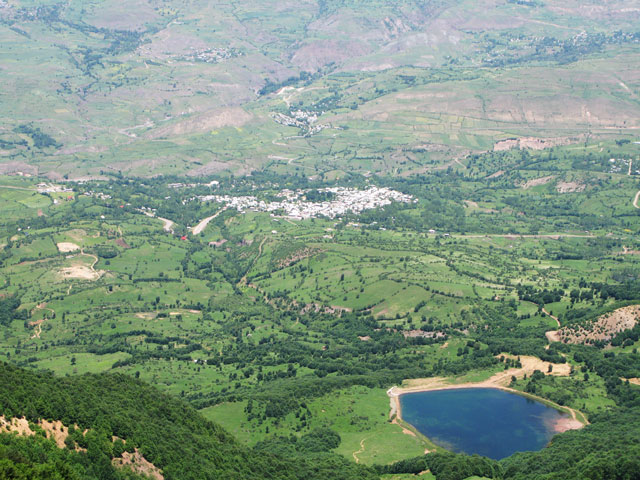
- The city of Barehsar

- Location within Iran
- Coordinates: 36°46′49″N 49°45′07″E
- Country: Iran
- Province: Gilan
- County: Rudbar
- District: Khurgam
- Established as a city: 2000

Population (2016)
  - Total: 1,612
- Time zone: UTC+3:30 (IRST)

Barehsar (Persian: بره سر) (Note: Also romanized as Barah Sar, Bareh Sar, and Barrah Sar; also known as Barāsar and Barehsar Mridhan) is a city in, and the capital of, Khurgam District in Rudbar County, Gilan province, Iran. It also serves as the administrative center for Khurgam Rural District. The village of Barehsar was converted to a city in 2000.

== Demographics ==
=== Population ===
At the time of the 2006 National Census, the city's population was 1,508 in 446 households. The following census in 2011 counted 1,416 people in 436 households. The 2016 census measured the population of the city as 1,612 people in 559 households.
