= Dolfak Rural District =

Rural district in Gilan province, Iran

Dolfak Rural District Persian: دهستان دلفک
- Rural District
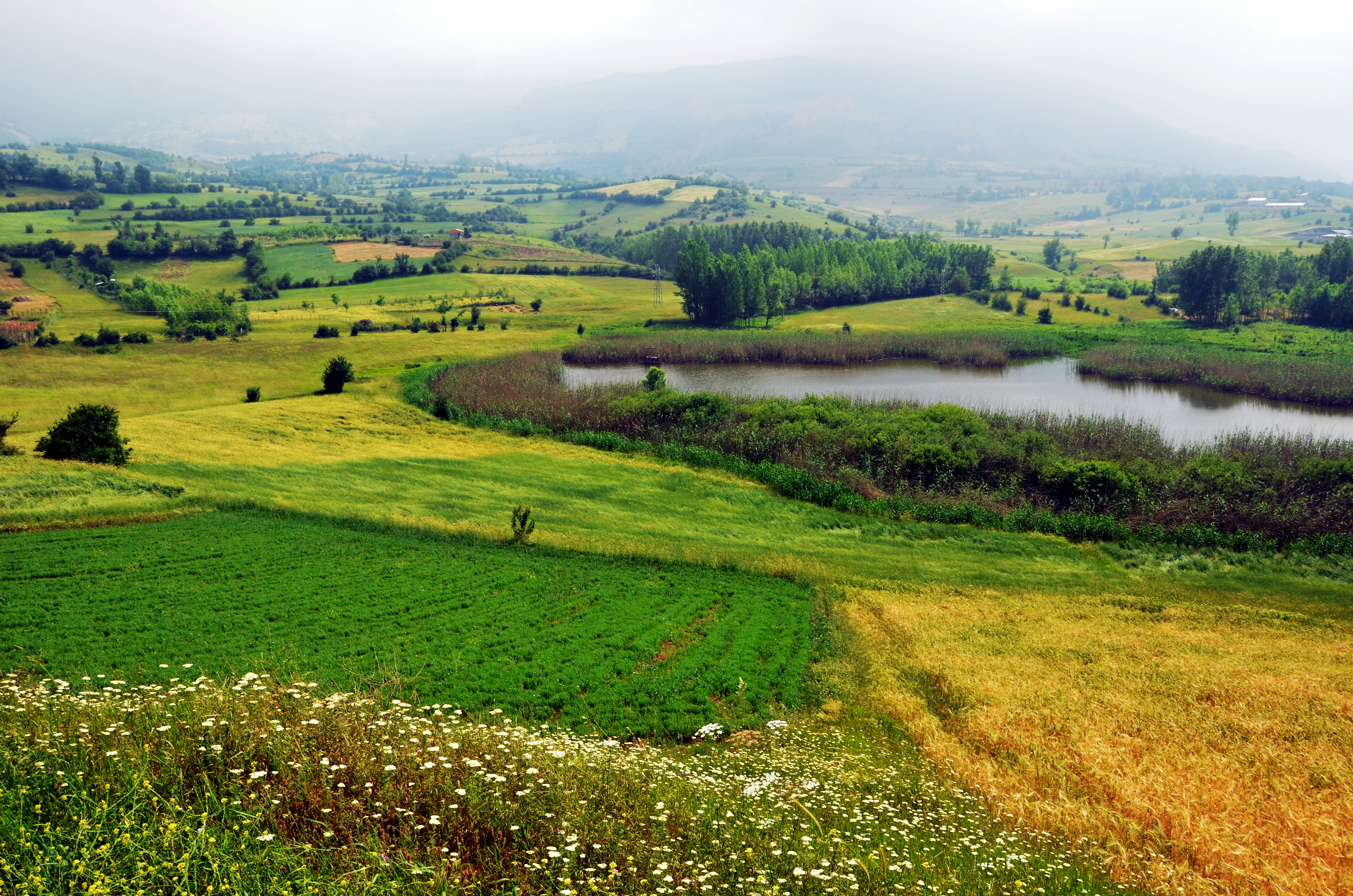
- Landscape near the village of Barehsar

- Location within Iran
- Coordinates: 36°45′N 49°38′E
- Country: Iran
- Province: Gilan
- County: Rudbar
- District: Khurgam
- Established: 1995
- Capital: Chahar Mahal

Population (2016)
  - Total: 2,449
- Time zone: UTC+3:30 (IRST)

Dolfak Rural District (Persian: دهستان دلفک) is in Khurgam District of Rudbar County, Gilan province, Iran. Its capital is the village of Chahar Mahal.

== Demographics ==
=== Population ===
At the time of the 2006 National Census, the rural district's population was 3,242 in 875 households. There were 3,093 inhabitants in 970 households at the following census of 2011. The 2016 census measured the population of the rural district as 2,449 in 875 households. The most populous of its 13 villages was Chahar Mahal, with 1,168 people.

=== Other villages in the rural district ===
- Bararud
- Heshmatabad
- Jalal Deh
- Liavol-e Olya
- Liavol-e Sofla
- Mashmian
- Shir Kadeh
- Vishan
