= SunTrust Bank Nigeria Limited =

Nigerian bank

Coordinates: 06°25′51″N 03°25′38″E

- Type: Private company
- Industry: Finance
- Genre: Banking
- Founded: 1 February 2009; 17 years ago
- Founder: Muhammad Jibrin Barde
- Headquarters: 1 Oladele Olashore Street, Off Sanusi Fafunwa Street, Victoria Island, Lagos, Lagos State, Nigeria
- Area served: Nigeria
- Key people: Olanrewaju Shittu; Chairman; Halima Buba; Chief Executive Officer
- Services: Banking
- Revenue: ▲Aftertax:₦157.87 million (2017)
- Total assets: ₦26.56 billion (2017)
- Website: www.suntrustng.com

SunTrust Bank Nigeria Limited (STBNL), is a Nigerian financial services provider, licensed as a commercial bank, by the Central Bank of Nigeria, the central bank and national banking regulator.

== Location ==
The headquarters and main branch of this bank are located at 1 Oladele Olashore Street, Off Sanusi Fafunwa Street, on Victoria Island, Lagos, Lagos State, Nigeria. The geographical coordinates of the bank's headquarters are: 06°25'50.0"N, 03°25'38.0"E (Latitude:6.430556; Longitude:3.427222).

== Overview ==
As of 31 December 2017, SunTrust Bank Nigeria Limited had total assets of ₦26.56 billion (approximately US$74.24 million), with shareholders' equity of ₦10.61 billion (approximately US$29.7 million).

== History ==
SunTrust was incorporated and founded in 2009 by Chief Executive, Muhammad Jibrin Barde as a mortgage bank and later converted to a commercial Bank. It was granted a regional commercial banking license by the Central Bank of Nigeria in November 2015, being the first commercial bank to receive a banking license since 2001, bringing the total of licensed commercial banks in Nigeria, at that time, to twenty-three. The bank opened for business to the public on 15 August 2016. It is also the first full-fledged technology bank in Nigeria.

In April 2018, STBNL was awarded the ISO/IEC 20071:2013 Certification by the Professional Evaluation and Certification Board (PECB), a Canadian certification body. At the same time, it was awarded the Payment Card Industry Data Security Standard (PCIDSS), by Digital Jewels, an IT consulting firm, focusing on IT governance, risk & compliance in Information Security, Information Assurance and Project Management.

In 2024, the bank was listed by the Central Bank of Nigeria to be among the licensed regional Deposit Money Banks (DMBs) functioning in Nigeria.

== Branches ==
As of August 2016, the bank maintained brick-and-mortar branches and automated teller machines in Lagos, Abuja, Uyo and Port-Harcourt. At that time, 90 percent of the bank's customers transacted business on digital platforms, without visiting any physical branch.

== See also ==
- List of banks
- List of banks in Nigeria
