= Grombalia =

Grombalia قرمبالية
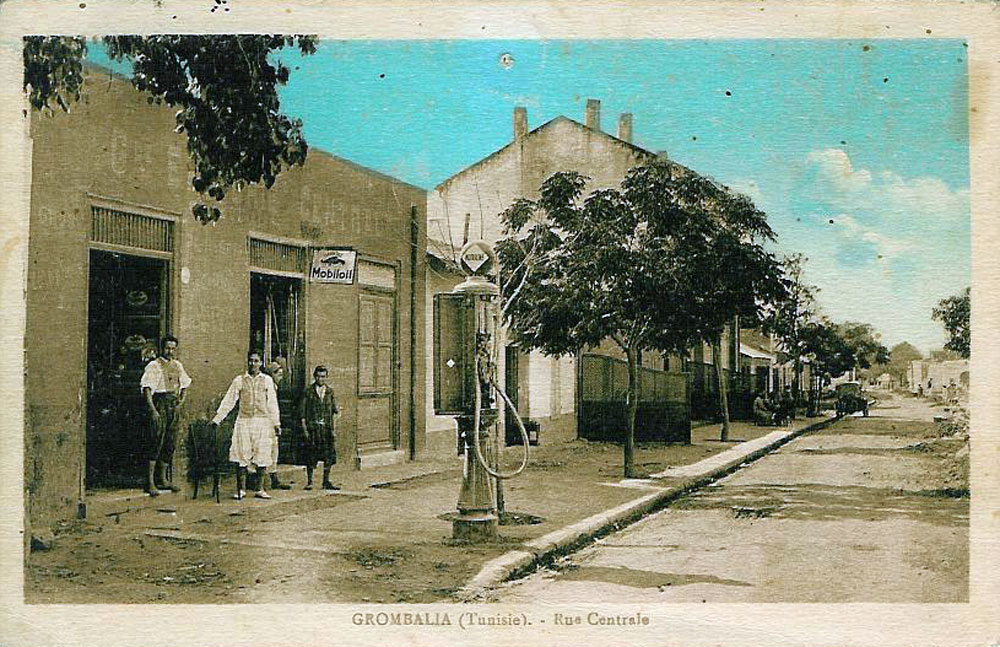

- Location in Tunisia
- Coordinates: 36°36′N 10°30′E
- Country: Tunisia
- Governorate: Nabeul Governorate

Area
  - Land: 66.9 sq mi (173.2 km^{2})

Population (2025)
  - Total: 75,860
  - Density: 726/sq mi (280.5/km^{2})
- Time zone: UTC1 (CET)
- Postal code: 8030

Grombalia is a Tunisian city located in the Nabeul Governorate. At the 2014 census, its population was 24,336, while the population of the municipality was 67,475. It is the birthplace of former president Moncef Marzouki.

Grombalia is located at an elevation of 102 meters above sea level and spans an area of 815.5 hectares. Its Latin name, "Hukulumbarros," translates to "traveling pigeon." Notably, Grombalia is characterized by its fertile lands and strategic geographical position in Cap Bon, making it a significant gateway to the region. Moreover, it is considered a suburb of Tunis due to its proximity and connections to the capital city.

Grombalia has two sister cities. Fort Smith, Arkansas, United States and Cisterna, Italy.

Grombalia is principally known for grape farming and have a grape vine statue at the city center.

== Neighboring villages ==
In addition to the town itself, the delegation of Grombalia includes several villages:

- Noual
- Nianou
- Turki
- Belli Gare
- Sabaa' Ouidiene
- Samech
- Touta
- Khouine
- Hay Seltane
- Aine Tabournouk
- Jbel Trif
- Khanget El Hujjej
- Khween

== Population ==
2025 Census (Municipal)
Males	Females	Total
38,915	38,462	77,377

== Figures from the City ==
- Moncef Marzouki
- Abd El Raouf Ben Aziza
- Halima Guenni
- Lamine Ben Aziza
- Med Jedidi
- Wael Jallouz
