= Tutkabon =

City in Gilan province, Iran

Tutkabon Persian: توتکابن
- City
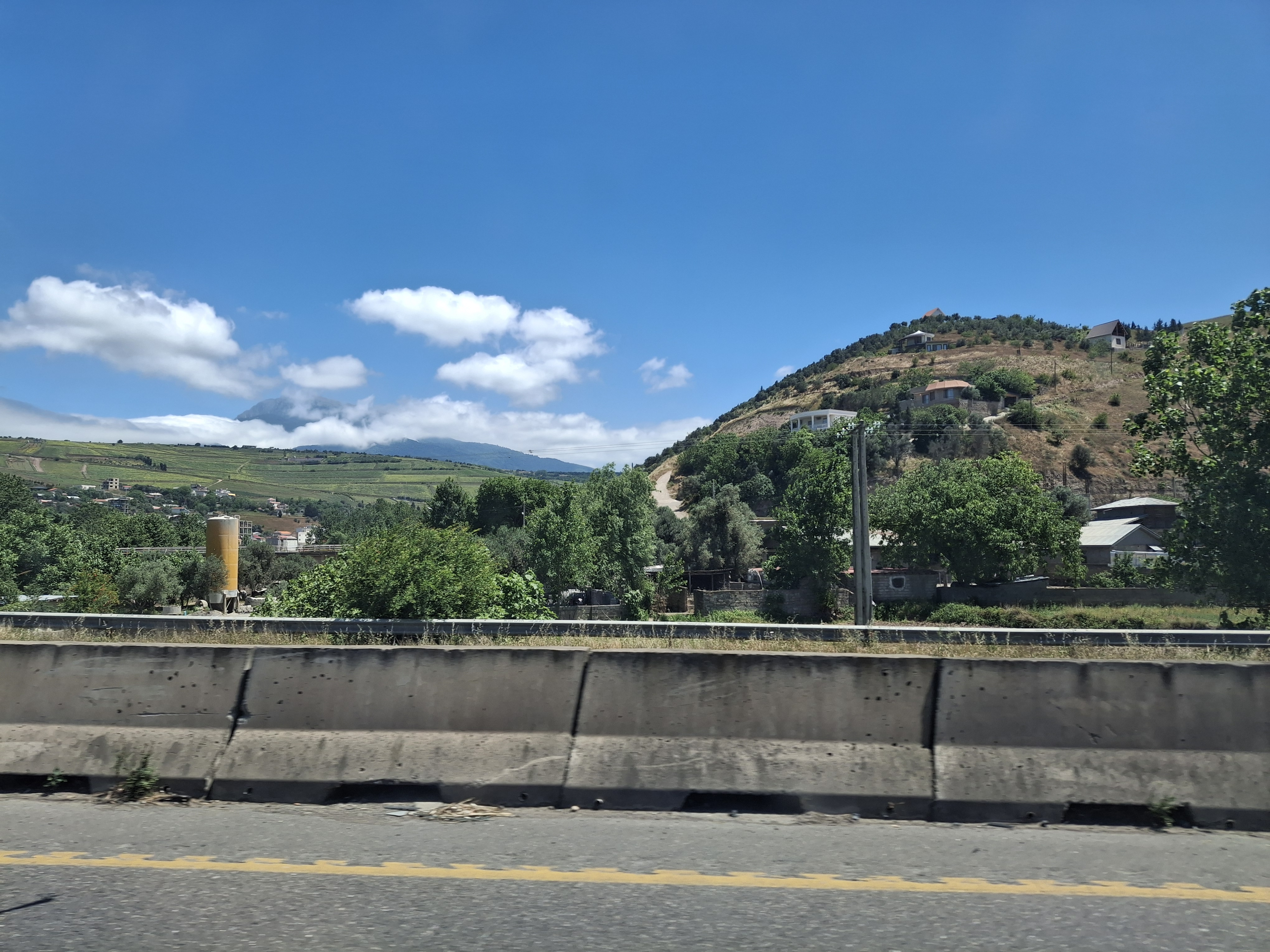
- The city of Tutkabon

- Location within Iran
- Coordinates: 36°53′36″N 49°31′37″E
- Country: Iran
- Province: Gilan
- County: Rudbar
- District: Rahmatabad and Blukat
- Established a city: 1996

Population (2016)
  - Total: 1,510
- Time zone: UTC+3:30 (IRST)

Tutkabon (Persian: توتکابن) (Note: Also romanized as Tūtkābon; also known as Tonkābon and Tutkabun) is a city in, and the capital of, Rahmatabad and Blukat District of Rudbar County, Gilan province, Iran. It also serves as the administrative center for Rahmatabad Rural District. It is on the Sefid Rud River in the Alborz (Elburz) mountain range.

== Demographics ==
People of Tutkabon speak the Rudbari dialect, a Tati dialect that is sometimes considered a subcategory of Gilaki.

=== Population ===
At the time of the 1986 census, Tutkabon was a village in Rahmatabad Rural District, in the Central District of Rudbar County. It had a population of 1,183 people in 239 households, of whom 721 were educated. Agricultural activities of Tutkabon included farming, gardening, and animal husbandry.

Tutkabon village became the seat of Rahmatabad Rural District in 1987., and became the seat of Rahmatabad and Blukat District in 1990. Tutkabon was converted to a city in 1996.

At the time of the 2006 National Census, the city's population was 1,671 in 473 households. The following census in 2011 counted 1,678 people in 519 households. The 2016 census measured the population of the city as 1,510 people in 493 households.
