= Rahmatabad Rural District (Rudbar County) =

Rural district in Gilan province, Iran

Rahmatabad Rural District Persian: دهستان رحمت آباد
- Rural District
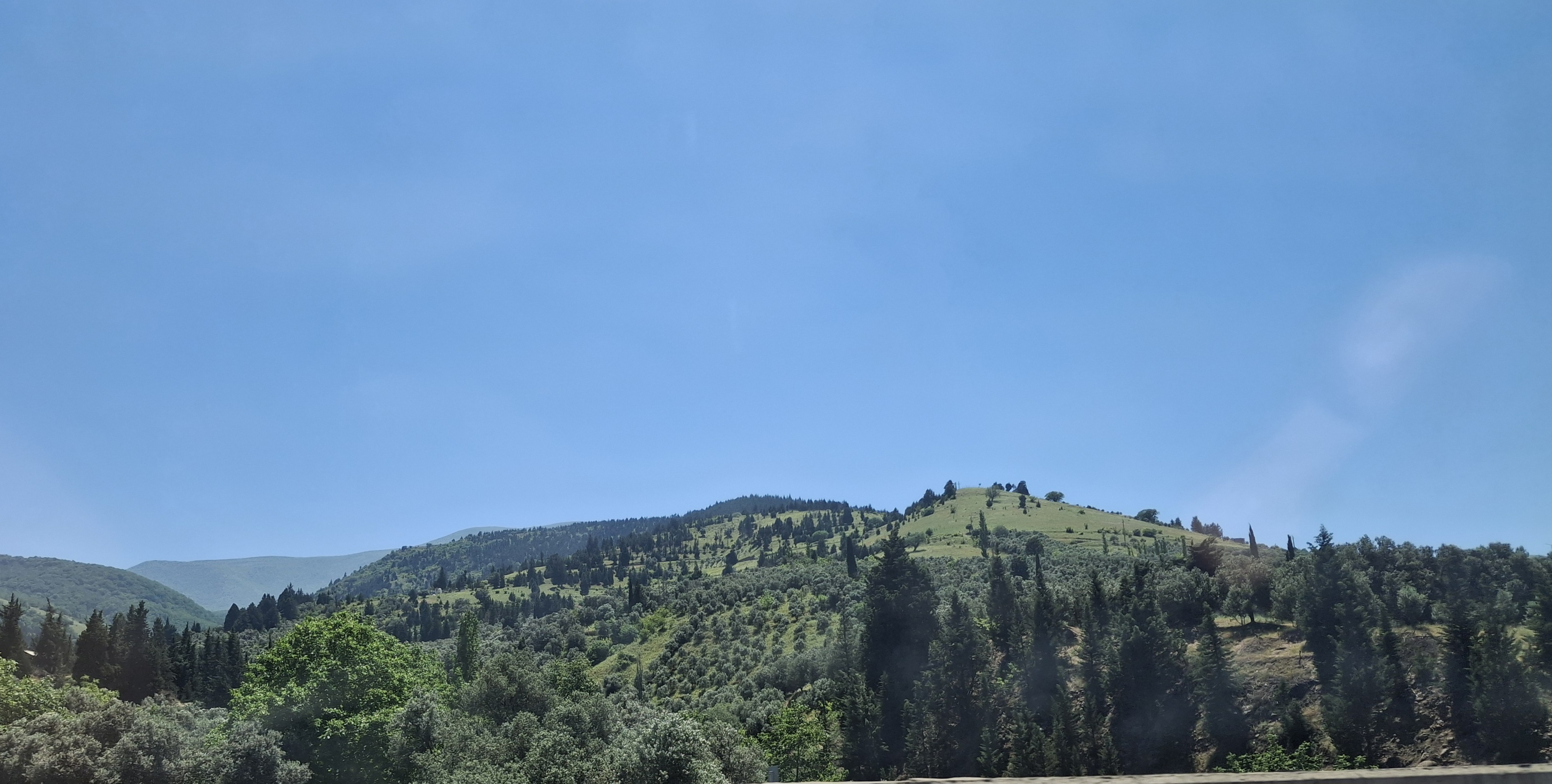
- Landscape in Rahmatabad Rural District in May 2025

- Location within Iran
- Coordinates: 36°53′N 49°32′E
- Country: Iran
- Province: Gilan
- County: Rudbar
- District: Rahmatabad and Blukat
- Established: 1987
- Capital: Tutkabon

Population (2016)
  - Total: 4,014
- Time zone: UTC+3:30 (IRST)

Rahmatabad Rural District (Persian: دهستان رحمت آباد) is in Rahmatabad and Blukat District of Rudbar County, Gilan province, Iran. It is administered from the city of Tutkabon.

== Demographics ==
=== Population ===
At the time of the 2006 National Census, the rural district's population was 4,855 in 1,434 households. There were 4,402 inhabitants in 1,377 households at the following census of 2011. The 2016 census measured the population of the rural district as 4,014 in 1,418 households. The most populous of its 23 villages was Estalakh Jan, with 666 people.

=== Other villages in the rural district ===
- Anarkul
- Darreh Mahalleh
- Div Rud
- Divrash
- Fathkuh
- Fishom
- Jazem Kol
- Kalayeh
- Kashkjan
- Kharashk
- Kiaabad
- Lisen
- Nesfi
- Rudabad
- Shahran
- Shir Kuh
- Sondos
