= Halima Sadaf Karimi =

Afghani politician and former MP

- Born: Jowzjan Province, Afghanistan
- Education: Degree Economics and Political Science
- Occupations: Politician in Afghanistan, former member of Parliament
- Known for: Campaigner for women's rights and political activism

Halima Sadaf Karimi is an Afghan politician and former member of Parliament.

Karimi was born in Afghanistan in the northern Jowzjan Province. Before becoming a politician she studied economics and political science.

She was named one of the 'BBC 100 Women' in 2021. She is known for standing up for the rights of Afghanistan's Uzbek minority and women's rights.

After receiving multiple death threats from the Taliban, Karimi fled across the border into Uzbekistan. In 2020, her younger brother was killed by the Taliban.
