= Halima Hassan Tukur =

Nigerian politician

Federal House of Representatives Member representing Yauri/Sanga/Ngaski Federal Constituency in Kebbi State
- In office 2007–2011
- Preceded by: Garba Uba Umar

Personal details
- Party: Peoples Democratic Party (PDP)

Halima Hassan Tukur Nigerian Politician, a former Federal House of Representatives Member representing Yauri/Sanga/Ngaski Federal Constituency in Kebbi state of the Peoples Democratic Party (PDP) from 2007 to 2011.

== Political career ==
Tukur was elected the member of the Federal House of Representatives in 2007 under the umbrella of the PDP in the national level. She took over from Hon. Garba Uba Umar and preceded by the same Garba.
