= Haleema Shakur-Still =

Medical researcher

- Known for: Research on tranexamic acid

Academic work
- Discipline: Global health
- Sub-discipline: Clinical trials
- Institutions: London School of Hygiene & Tropical Medicine

Haleema Shakur-Still is a professor of Global Health Clinical Trials and the co-director of London School of Hygiene & Tropical Medicine's Clinical Trials Unit.

== Scientific career ==
Shakur-Still has worked in global health clinical trials for over 16 years, specifically focusing on emergency care. Shakur-Still's work includes designing and conducting clinical trials, as well as developing ways to communicate the work to clinicians, policy makers, and the public.

Shakur-Still ran the WOMAN Trial which looked the blood clot stabilising drug tranexamic acid for post-delivery bleeding, which is the largest cause of maternal mortality around the world. This trial involved over 20,000 patients from 21 countries.

In 2017 the World Health Organization updated their guidance from 2012 to recommend the use of tranexamic acid within three hours of birth when postpartum haemorrhage is diagnosed.

In February 2018 the WOMAN project was the third winner of the European Commission's Horizon Birth Day Prize, and was awarded a €500,000 prize by the MSD for Mothers.

== Selected scientific publications ==
- Roberts, I., H. Shakur, T. Coats, B. Hunt, E. Balogun, L. Barnetson, L. Cook et al. "The CRASH-2 trial: a randomised controlled trial and economic evaluation of the effects of tranexamic acid on death, vascular occlusive events and transfusion requirement in bleeding trauma patients." Health technology assessment (Winchester, England) 17, no. 10 (2013): 1.
- CRASH Trial Collaborators. "Effect of intravenous corticosteroids on death within 14 days in 10 008 adults with clinically significant head injury (MRC CRASH trial): randomised placebo-controlled trial." The Lancet 364, no. 9442 (2004): 1321–1328.
- Mousa, Hatem A., Jennifer Blum, Ghada Abou El Senoun, Haleema Shakur, and Zarko Alfirevic. "Treatment for primary postpartum haemorrhage." Cochrane Database of Systematic Reviews 2 (2014).
- Ker, Katharine, Phil Edwards, Pablo Perel, Haleema Shakur, and Ian Roberts. "Effect of tranexamic acid on surgical bleeding: systematic review and cumulative meta-analysis." Bmj 344 (2012): e3054.
