= Halima Yakoy Adam =

Chadian paralegal (born 2000)

- Born: c. 2000; Island in Lake Chad, Chad
- Citizenship: Chadian
- Occupation: Paralegal
- Years active: 2015–present
- Organisation: UNFPA-supported programs
- Known for: Survivor of Boko Haram forced suicide bombing; advocacy for women survivors of violence
- Notable work: Community legal support and advocacy in Chad

Halima Yakoy Adam (born around 2000 on an island in Lake Chad) is a Chadian paralegal. Drugged and strapped to an explosive device, she was forced into a crowded market in Bol, Chad on 22 December 2015. She lost two legs, but survived. After rehabilitation, she studied to become a paralegal. After that, she has worked to help other women survivors of violence in Chad.

== Life ==
When Halima Yakoy Adam was fifteen years old, her husband, a Boko Haram member, brought her to an island near the Nigerian border. He told her that they were going on a fishing trip. It turned out that he brought her to a Boko Haram training camp, where she was forced to become a suicide bomber. After having been drugged, she was strapped to an explosive device, and after that, on 22 December 2015 sent into a crowded market in Bol in western Chad. Two other girls detonated their bombs and lost their lives, and Yakoy Adam lost her legs. She herself was however rescued in time.

After having been restored to health, returned to her home on the island Ngomirom Doumou in Lake Chad. UNFPA had presence on these islands, with programs to help survivors of gender-based violence and from Boko Haram. Yakoy Adam received care and rehabilitation, and trained to become a paralegal in Bol. In this position, she works to help other women survivors of violence in Chad, and works against radicalism and extreme violence.

Amina J. Mohammed, Deputy Secretary-General of the United Nations, praised Yakoy Adam's resilience: "Halima has moved from victim to survivor because she is using that experience to educate other girls."
