= Halima Buba =

Nigerian banker and business executive

Managing Director/Chief Executive Officer SunTrust Bank Nigeria Limited

Personal details
- Education: University of Maiduguri
- Profession: Banker

Halima Buba is a Nigerian business woman and banker from Adamawa state. She currently serves as the Managing Director and CEO of Sun Trust Bank plc.

== Early life and career ==
Buba graduated with a bachelor's degree in Business management and MBA from the University of Maiduguri. She is an alumnus of the Lagos Business School and honorary member of the Chartered Institute of Bankers and a Fellow of the Institute of Management Consultants.

She was appointed as the MD/CEO of Sun Trust Bank in January 2021 after serving as the deputy general manager in Ecobank Nigeria.
