= Halima Embarek Warzazi =

Moroccan diplomat and activist (born 1933)

- Born: 1933 (age 92–93); Casablanca, Morocco
- Citizenship: Moroccan
- Occupations: Diplomat, human rights activist

Halima Embarek Warzazi (Arabic: حليمة مبارك ورزازي; born 1933) is a Moroccan diplomat and human rights activist, who has had a long career with the United Nations.
