= Lisin (surname) =

Lisin (Russian: Лисин) is a Russian masculine surname; its feminine counterpart is Lisina. It originates from the Russian masculine given name Lisa, which means fox and is unrelated to the feminine given name Lisa. It may refer to

- Enver Lisin (born 1986), Russian ice hockey forward
- Gennadiy Lisin, birth name of Gennadiy Aygi (1934–2006), Chuvash poet and a translator
- Vladimir Lisin (born 1956), Russian steel tycoon
- Yekaterina Lisina (born 1987), Russian basketball player
