= Dasht-e Veyl Rural District =

Rural district in Gilan province, Iran

Dasht-e Veyl Rural District Persian: دهستان دشت ويل
- Rural District
- Location within Iran
- Coordinates: 36°50′N 49°36′E
- Country: Iran
- Province: Gilan
- County: Rudbar
- District: Rahmatabad and Blukat
- Established: 1987
- Capital: Dasht-e Veyl

Population (2016)
  - Total: 4,927
- Time zone: UTC+3:30 (IRST)

Dasht-e Veyl Rural District (Persian: دهستان دشت ويل) is in Rahmatabad and Blukat District of Rudbar County, Gilan province, Iran. Its capital is the village of Dasht-e Veyl.

== Demographics ==
=== Population ===
At the time of the 2006 National Census, the rural district's population was 5,416 in 1,422 households. There were 4,628 inhabitants in 1,399 households at the following census of 2011. The 2016 census measured the population of the rural district as 4,927 in 1,667 households. The most populous of its 24 villages was Rashi, with 696 people.

=== Other villages in the rural district ===
- Chak
- Chalga Sar
- Cheleh Bar
- Chorreh
- Dafraz
- Darreh Dasht
- Estakhrgah
- Hajji Deh
- Hajji Shirkia
- Khaseh Kul
- Kolus Forush
- Konbak
- Lafand Sara
- Makhshar
- Palang Darreh
- Pareh
- Pasin Darreh
- Poshtehan
- Rajun
- Rudkhaneh
- Seyyedan
- Vailjar
