= Asiabarak, Siahkal =

Aciabarak آسیابرک
- Village
- Interactive map of Aciabarak
- Coordinates: 36°51′51″N 49°55′37″E
- Country: Iran
- Province: Gilan
- County: Siahkal
- Bakhsh: Deylaman
- Rural District: Deylaman

Population (2006)
  - Total: 31
- Time zone: UTC+3:30 (IRST)

Aciabarak or Asiabarak (Persian: آسیابرک, also Romanized as Āsīābarak) is a village in Deylaman Rural District, Deylaman District, Siahkal County, Gilan Province, Iran. At the 2016 census, its population was 19, in 6 families. Down from 31 people in 2006.
