= Halima Abdallah Bulembo =

Tanzanian politician

District Commissioner of Muheza District Tanga Region
- Incumbent
- Assumed office June 2021

Personal details
- Born: 1 April 1991 (age 35) Kagera Region, Tanzania
- Education: Tumaini University

Halima Abdallah Bulembo (born 1 April 1991) is a District Commissioner for Muheza District, Tanga Region. Prior to her appointment, Halima Abdallah Bulembo served as a Special Seats Member of Parliament for Kagera Region in Tanzania. She was appointed to her seat in November 2015, making her the youngest female parliamentarian in the 11th parliament of Tanzania and was in office until October, 2020.

== Early life and education ==
Halima Abdallah Bulembo was born in April 1991 in Kagera, North-western Tanzania. She joined Nyasho Primary School in 1998 and completed in 2004. She then joined Dr. Didas Secondary School in 2005 and completed her O levels in 2008. In 2009, she joined St. Anne Marie Academy High School and completed in 2011. Halima then studied for a bachelor's degree at Tumaini University from 2011, graduating in 2014.

== Political life and experience ==
Halima started her political career first as a national scout for the ruling party, Chama cha Mapinduzi (CCM) in 2002 while also serving as a Member of the National Scouts Steering Committee up to 2006. In the same period, she was also a member of the Executive Council of Umoja wa Vijana wa CCM (UVCCM), the youth wing of the ruling party.

She was appointed to serve as a Special Seats Member of Parliament in 2015. Her term ended in October 2020.
