= Halima Ali Adan =

Somali activist

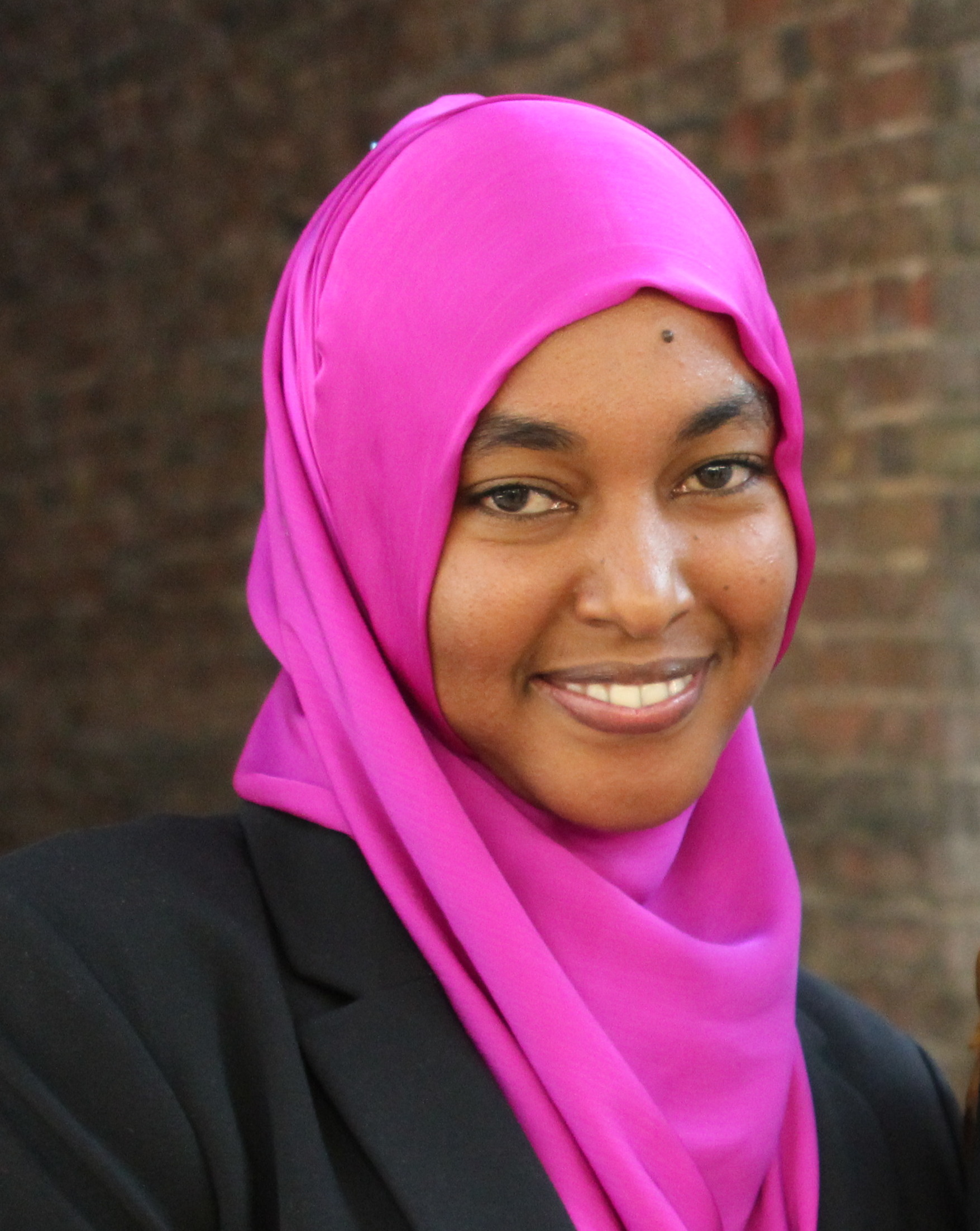
- Halima Adan, 2013
- Born: 1984 (age 41–42); Mombasa, Kenya
- Education: University of Greenwich
- Occupation: Gender rights activist
- Known for: Advocacy against female genital mutilation (FGM)
- Website: http://www.sswc-som.com/

Halima Ali Adan is a Somali gender rights activist and an expert on female genital mutilation (FGM). She is national co-chair of the Gender Based Violence (GBV) working group and program manager for Save Somali Women and Children (SSWC), a non-profit humanitarian organization based in Somalia.

== Early life ==
Adan was born and raised in Mombasa, Kenya. She studied Computer Science at the University of Greenwich in London where she earned a BSc degree. After obtaining a MSc in Development Studies, Adan initially worked for an Internet service provider in Kenya.

== Career ==
Since 2014, Adan has worked for Save Somali Women and Children (SSWC) as a program manager and co-chair of the Gender Based Violence work group (GBV). SSWC was founded in 1992 in Mogadishu by Somali women, whose goals were to create a non-profit organization that would support Somali girls and women who were marginalized and experiencing violence and poverty in their communities.

Adan's GBV team has faced many obstacles in obtaining justice for Somali victims of gender violence. A shortage of sufficiently trained police officers to respond to GBV cases, a low number of female police officers, lack of confidence in the Somali judicial system, and fear of retaliation by perpetrators, prevent many victims from reporting GBV crimes.

In 2014, the UK government in support of Somali non-government humanitarian organizations, provided funding to SSWC and other South-Central Somali based organizations as part of £1 million of UK spending on projects to prevent sexual violence across Somalia. The funds began initially with providing basic services for victims. "Projects focus on training and capacity building including health workers, providing psychosocial, legal, and economic support and raising awareness through education."

Funding from the UK was supplemented with additional funding and support from the United Nations Population Fund (UNFPA) and the Office of U.S. Foreign Disaster Assistance (OFDA/USAID) in 2015. The international support has enabled Adan and her GBV team to expand their program, coordinate with other Somali GBV work groups and provide additional training of GBV coordinators in South Central and the Puntland region of Somalia.
