= Khurgam Rural District =

Rural district in Gilan province, Iran

Khurgam Rural District Persian: دهستان خورگام
- Rural District
- Location within Iran
- Coordinates: 36°49′N 49°45′E
- Country: Iran
- Province: Gilan
- County: Rudbar
- District: Khurgam
- Capital: Barehsar

Population (2016)
  - Total: 5,223
- Time zone: UTC+3:30 (IRST)

Khurgam Rural District (Persian: دهستان خورگام) is in Khurgam District of Rudbar County, Gilan province, Iran. It is administered from the city of Barehsar.

== Demographics ==
=== Population ===
At the time of the 2006 National Census, the rural district's population was 5,715 in 1,672 households. There were 5,276 inhabitants in 1,719 households at the following census of 2011. The 2016 census measured the population of the rural district as 5,223 in 1,914 households. The most populous of its 31 villages was Sibon, with 537 people.

=== Other villages in the rural district ===
- Asia Barak
- Chehesh
- Chelvan Sara
- Chichal
- Donbal Deh
- Dowsaledeh
- Espahabdan
- Estalkh Kuh
- Galankash
- Garzaneh Chak
- Gerd Visheh
- Gupol
- Karaf Chal
- Koshkosh
- Magas Khani
- Nash
- Naveh
- Now Deh
- Pastal Kuh
- Poshteh Kolah
- Qusheh Laneh
- Sang Sarak
- Seh Pestanak
- Seyqaldeh
- Shah-e Shahidan
- Talakuh
- Tiyeh
