= Halima Kanni =

Tunisian politician (born 1964)

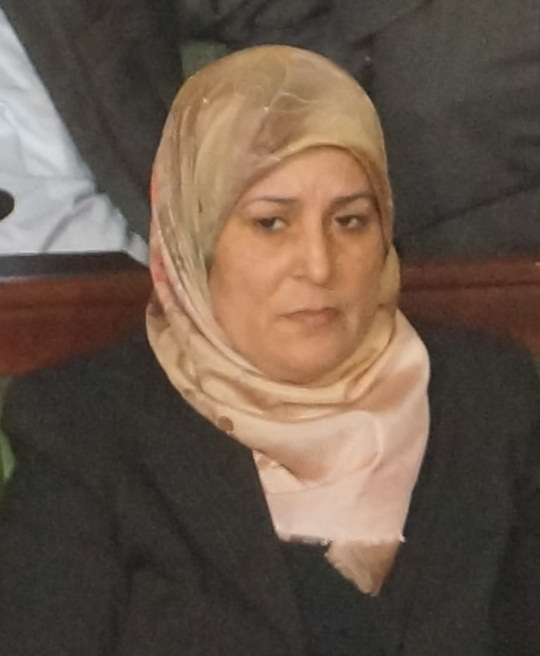
- Born: 14 March 1964 (age 61); Grombalia

Halima Kanni (born 14 March 1964) is a Tunisian politician for the Ennahda party. She was elected to represent part of Tunis in 2011.

== Life ==
Kanni was born in Grombalia in 1964. She was awarded a scientific baccalaureate in 1983. She continued studying medicine in Tunis completing an internship in France. She has a doctorate in the area of genetic diseases from Hôpital Charles-Nicolle.

She represented the Islamist party Ennahda in the elections in Tunisia for the second district of Tunis. She was elected to the Constituent Assembly on 23 October 2011. She served on the regional and local public authorities board and the infrastructure and environment committee.

In 2012, she caused discord with the media when she accused them of a lack of patriotism and for being under foreign influences. In this regard she cited the French ambassador. The press left the building in protest and the parliamentary leader of Ennahda, Sahbi Atig, disassociated his party from Kanni's accusations.
