= Ombadda =

Neighborhood of Omdurman, Sudan

Ombadda is a locality in Khartoum State, Sudan. It is located approximately 10 km from the capital, Khartoum, and approximately 2 km from Omdurman. It was formerly a district of Omdurman, but after its expansion and separation from Omdurman, it became a locality in its own right.[1]

== History ==
Ombadda has been affected by the Battle of Khartoum. In July 2023, the SAF airstrikes and shelling killed at least 16 people in Ombadda. There were reports of shelling in five housing blocks. In September 2023, 23 civilians were killed in airstrikes. The Ombada Emergency Response Room has given humanitarian aid.

In 2024, the situation in Ombadda became reportedly "uninhabitable" amid a sanitary crisis caused by the presence of decomposing corpses in the streets. In 2025, a graphic video emerged reportedly showing a civilian in Ombadda being shot by the Sudanese Armed Forces (SAF) .
