= Div Rud, Rudsar =

Div Rud ديورود
- Village
- Location within Iran
- Coordinates: 36°53′14″N 50°13′06″E
- Country: Iran
- Province: Gilan
- County: Rudsar
- Bakhsh: Rahimabad
- Rural District: Eshkevar-e Sofla

Population (2006)
  - Total: 99
- Time zone: UTC+3:30 (IRST)
  - Summer (DST): UTC+4:30 (IRDT)

Div Rud (Persian: ديورود, also Romanized as Dīv Rūd) is a village in Eshkevar-e Sofla Rural District, Rahimabad District, Rudsar County, Gilan Province, Iran. At the 2006 census, its population was 99, in 32 families.
