= Sang Sarak, Mazandaran =

Sang Sarak سنگ سرک
- Village
- Location within Iran
- Coordinates: 36°30′00″N 51°14′55″E
- Country: Iran
- Province: Mazandaran
- County: Chalus
- Bakhsh: Marzanabad
- Rural District: Birun Bashm

Population (2016)
  - Total: 168
- Time zone: UTC+3:30 (IRST)

Sang Sarak (Persian: سنگ سرک) is a village in Birun Bashm Rural District, in Marzanabad District of Chalus County, Mazandaran Province, Iran.

At the time of the 2006 National Census, the village's population was 166. The following census in 2011 counted 170 people in 63 households. The 2016 census measured the population of the village as 168 people in 71 households.
