= Halima Khatun (politician) =

Bangladeshi politician

Member of Bangladesh Parliament
- In office 1991 – February 1996

Personal details
- Political party: Bangladesh Nationalist Party

Halima Khatun is a Bangladesh Nationalist Party politician and a former member of parliament from a reserved seat.

== Career ==
Khatun was elected to parliament from a reserved seat as a Bangladesh Nationalist Party candidate in 1991. She was reelected in February 1996.
