= Blukat Rural District =

Rural district in Gilan province, Iran

Blukat Rural District Persian: دهستان بلوكات
- Rural District
- Location within Iran
- Coordinates: 37°01′N 49°39′E
- Country: Iran
- Province: Gilan
- County: Rudbar
- District: Rahmatabad and Blukat
- Established: 1987
- Capital: Shahr-e Bijar

Population (2016)
  - Total: 4,440
- Time zone: UTC+3:30 (IRST)

Blukat Rural District (Persian: دهستان بلوكات) is in Rahmatabad and Blukat District of Rudbar County, Gilan province, Iran. Its capital is the village of Shahr-e Bijar.

== Demographics ==
=== Population ===
At the time of the 2006 National Census, the rural district's population was 5,710 in 1,430 households. There were 4,859 inhabitants in 1,426 households at the following census of 2011. The 2016 census measured the population of the rural district as 4,440 in 1,463 households. The most populous of its 21 villages was Shahr-e Bijar, with 877 people.

=== Other villages in the rural district ===
- Ber Agur
- Halimeh Jan
- Kandalat
- Kukeneh
- Liafu
- Mirza Golband
- Sheykh Ali Tuseh
