= Khurgam District =

District in Gilan province, Iran

Khurgam District Persian: بخش خورگام
- District
- Location within Iran
- Coordinates: 36°48′N 49°43′E
- Country: Iran
- Province: Gilan
- County: Rudbar
- Established: 1997
- Capital: Barehsar

Population (2016)
  - Total: 9,284
- Time zone: UTC+3:30 (IRST)

Khurgam District (Persian: بخش خورگام) is in Rudbar County, Gilan province, Iran. Its capital is the city of Barehsar.

== Demographics ==
=== Population ===
At the time of the 2006 National Census, the district's population was 10,465 in 2,993 households. The following census in 2011 counted 9,785 people in 3,125 households. The 2016 census measured the population of the district as 9,284 inhabitants in 3,348 households.

=== Administrative divisions ===
Khurgam District Population
| Administrative Divisions | 2006 | 2011 | 2016 |
|---|---|---|---|
| Dolfak RD | 3,242 | 3,093 | 2,449 |
| Khurgam RD | 5,715 | 5,276 | 5,223 |
| Barehsar (city) | 1,508 | 1,416 | 1,612 |
| Total | 10,465 | 9,785 | 9,284 |
RD = Rural District
