= Rahmatabad and Blukat District =

District in Gilan province, Iran

Rahmatabad and Blukat District Persian: بخش رحمت‌آباد و بلوکات
- District
- Location within Iran
- Coordinates: 36°57′N 49°36′E
- Country: Iran
- Province: Gilan
- County: Rudbar
- Capital: Tutkabon

Population (2016)
  - Total: 14,891
- Time zone: UTC+3:30 (IRST)

Rahmatabad and Blukat District (Persian: بخش رحمت‌آباد و بلوکات) is in Rudbar County, Gilan province, Iran. Its capital is the city of Tutkabon.

== Demographics ==
=== Population ===
At the time of the 2006 National Census, the district's population was 17,652 in 4,759 households. The following census in 2011 counted 15,567 people in 4,721 households. The 2016 census measured the population of the district as 14,891 inhabitants in 5,041 households.

=== Administrative divisions ===
Rahmatabad and Blukat District Population
Administrative Divisions	2006	2011	2016
Blukat RD	5,710	4,859	4,440
Dasht-e Veyl RD	5,416	4,628	4,927
Rahmatabad RD	4,855	4,402	4,014
Tutkabon (city)	1,671	1,678	1,510
Total	17,652	15,567	14,891
RD = Rural District
