= Rudbar County =

County in Gilan province, Iran

Rudbar County Persian: شهرستان رودبار
- County
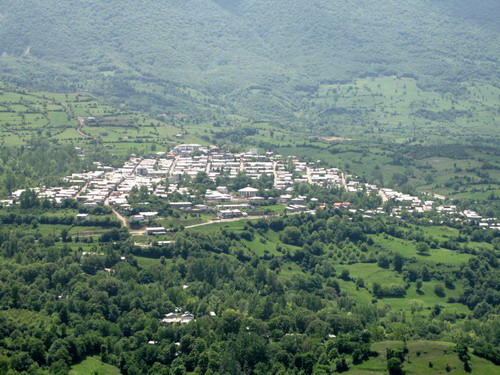

- Location of Rudbar County in Gilan province (bottom, yellow)

- Location of Gilan province in Iran
- Coordinates: 36°50′N 49°40′E
- Country: Iran
- Province: Gilan
- Capital: Rudbar
- Districts: Central, Amarlu, Khorgam, Lowshan, Rahmatabad and Blukat

Population (2016)
  - Total: 94,720
- Time zone: UTC+3:30 (IRST)

Rudbar County (Persian: شهرستان رودبار) is in Gilan province, Iran. Its capital is the city of Rudbar.

== History ==
In 2024, 12 villages and the city of Lowshan were separated from the Central District in the formation of Lowshan District, including the new Jamalabad and Pachenar Rural Districts.

== Demographics ==
=== Population ===
At the time of the 2006 National Census, the county's population was 101,884 in 27,902 households. The following census in 2011 counted 100,943 people in 30,312 households. The 2016 census measured the population of the county as 94,720 in 31,146 households.

=== Administrative divisions ===
Rudbar County's population history and administrative structure over three consecutive censuses are shown in the following table.

Rudbar County Population
| Administrative Divisions | 2006 | 2011 | 2016 |
|---|---|---|---|
| Central District | 65,797 | 68,631 | 63,336 |
| Kalashtar RD | 5,327 | 5,329 | 4,289 |
| Rostamabad-e Jonubi RD | 3,623 | 3,489 | 3,657 |
| Rostamabad-e Shomali RD | 2,782 | 2,549 | 2,478 |
| Lowshan (city) | 14,596 | 15,193 | 13,032 |
| Manjil (city) | 16,028 | 17,396 | 15,630 |
| Rostamabad (city) | 11,987 | 13,749 | 13,746 |
| Rudbar (city) | 11,454 | 10,926 | 10,504 |
| Amarlu District | 7,970 | 6,960 | 7,208 |
| Jirandeh RD | 2,826 | 2,372 | 2,656 |
| Kalisham RD | 2,528 | 2,004 | 2,232 |
| Jirandeh (city) | 2,616 | 2,584 | 2,320 |
| Khurgam District | 10,465 | 9,785 | 9,284 |
| Dolfak RD | 3,242 | 3,093 | 2,449 |
| Khurgam RD | 5,715 | 5,276 | 5,223 |
| Barehsar (city) | 1,508 | 1,416 | 1,612 |
| Lowshan District (Note: Established after the 2016 census) | | | |
| Jamalabad RD | | | |
| Pachenar RD | | | |
| Lowshan (city) | 14,596 | 15,193 | 13,032 |
| Rahmatabad and Blukat District | 17,652 | 15,567 | 14,891 |
| Blukat RD | 5,710 | 4,859 | 4,440 |
| Dasht-e Veyl RD | 5,416 | 4,628 | 4,927 |
| Rahmatabad RD | 4,855 | 4,402 | 4,014 |
| Tutkabon (city) | 1,671 | 1,678 | 1,510 |
| Total | 101,884 | 100,943 | 94,720 |
RD = Rural District

== The Royal County Council of Rudbar ==
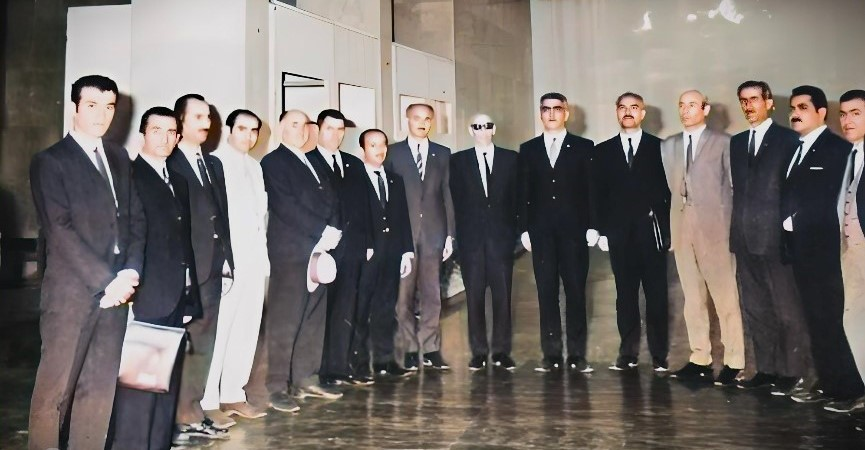
The Royal Council of Rudbar County visits the Persian Royal Court

The Royal Council of Rudbar County visited the Persian Royal Court and had a meeting with his majesty, King Mohammad Reza Shah Pahlavi. The Honorable Members of The Council included:

- The President of the Rudbar County Council: Mr. Ziaeddin Tavakkoli Bivarzeni Amarlu, 8th from right
- The Vice President of the Rudbar County Council: Mr. Talesh Khan Valizadeh Elysee, 10th from right
- The MP of Rudbar County: Mr. Mahmud Tavassoli Manjili, 7th from right
- Mr. Ali Naqi Arefi, 1st person from the right
- Mr. Alexander Jabbari Manjili, 2nd from the right
- Mr. Namdar Khan Sharifi Pirkuhi Amarlu, 3rd of the Right
- Mr. Fazel Tavassoli Manjili, 4th person from the right
- Mr. Mehdi Ebrahimi Luya, 5th person from the right
- Mr. Mohammad Mehraban Kalatei, 6th from Right
- Mr. Hassan Hassan Malekzadeh, 9th person from the right
- Mr. Sattar Khan Salimi Galangashi Amarlu, 11th from Right
- Mr. Manuchehr Khan Salimi Galangashi Amarlu, 12th person from right
- Mr. Jacob Latifi Doabsari, 13th of the Right
- Mr. Reza Hashemi Skolk, 15th from the right

== See also ==
Media related to Rudbar County at Wikimedia Commons
