= Jamalpur =

Jamalpur may refer to:

== Bangladesh ==
- Jamalpur District
  - Jamalpur, Bangladesh
    - Jamalpur Government College
    - Jamalpur Medical College, affiliated with the University of Dhaka, Bangladesh
    - Jamalpur Stadium
  - Jamalpur Sadar Upazila
  - Jamalpur Zila School, a public high school in Jamalpur District and one of the oldest schools in Bangladesh

== India ==
- Jamalpur, Gujarat, a village in Ahmedabad district, Gujarat
  - Jamalpur-Khadiya Assembly constituency
- Jamalpur, Phagwara, a village in Punjab, India

=== Bihar ===
- Jamalpur, Bihar, a suburb and municipality in Munger district, Bihar
  - Jamalpur, Bihar Assembly constituency, a legislative assembly of Bihar, India
  - Jamalpur Junction, station code JMP, serving the Munger-Jamalpur twin cities in Munger, Bihar
  - Jamalpur Gymkhana, a hostel for young apprentice officers of the Indian Railways
  - Jamalpur Locomotive Workshop, in India, set up by the East Indian Railway
- Jamalpur, Khagaria, a village in Khagaria district, Bihar

=== Haryana ===
- Jamalpur, Bhiwani, a village in the Bhiwani district, Haryana
- Jamalpur, Haryana, a village in Yamunanagar district, Haryana

=== Uttar Pradesh ===
- Jamalpur, Jaunpur, a village in Jaunpur district, Uttar Pradesh
- Jamalpur (Mirzapur district), a village in Mirzapur district, Uttar Pradesh
- Jamalpur Karaundi, a village in Raebareli district, Uttar Pradesh

=== West Bengal ===
- Jamalpur (community development block), West Bengal
  - Jamalpur, Bardhaman, a village with a police station and CD block headquarters, in Purba Bardhaman district, West Bengal
    - Jamalpur, West Bengal Assembly constituency, an assembly constituency in West Bengal
    - Jamalpur Mahavidyalaya, college in Jamalpur, Purba Bardhaman district, West Bengal

== Pakistan ==
- Jamalpur, Pakistan, a town in Bahawalpur District, Punjab

== See also ==
- Jamalabad (disambiguation)
- Jamalpur Assembly constituency (disambiguation)
