= Miranpur =

Miranpur may refer to:

- Miranpur, Bhulath, a village in Kapurthala district, Punjab, India
- Miranpur, Nakodar, a village in Jalandhar district, Punjab, India
- Miranpur, Phagwara, a village in Kapurthala district, Punjab, India
- Miranpur, Punjab, a town in Lahore District, Punjab, Pakistan
- Miranpur, Sindh, a village in Naushahro Feroze, Sindh, Pakistan
- Miranpur, Sultanpur Lodhi, a village in Kapurthala district, Punjab, India
- Miranpur, Uttar Pradesh, a town in Muzaffarnagar district, Uttar Pradesh, India

== See also ==
- Miran Pur, a village in Rajanpur district, Punjab, Pakistan
