= Sahibnagar =

Pakistani town

- Location within Pakistan
- Coordinates: 31.21°N 73.4°E
- Country: Pakistan
- Province: Punjab
- Elevation: 167 m (548 ft)
- Time zone: UTC+5 (PST)

Sahibnagar is a town located in Punjab (Pakistan), located within the Lahore District, near the city of Lahore. Neighbouring settlements include Hari Singwala to the west and Rodasar to the south.
