= Indian Railways coaching stock =

Indian Railways coaching stock consists of various travel-classes of passenger coaches, freight wagons, and other specialised coaching stock for specific uses. The Indian Railways, which operates India's railway system, comes under the purview of the Ministry of Railways of the Government of India. As of 2022, it operates over 8,000 trains daily using an inventory of 84,863 passenger coaches and 318,196 freight wagons. The rolling stock is manufactured by five units owned by the Indian Railways, four public sector units, and one private company.

== History ==
The rail coaches were manufactured in India from 1956, when the Integral Coach Factory was established. The coaches were based on a prototype by a Swiss company and were termed ICF coaches. These coaches, manufactured from 1956 to 2018, were largely in use till the early 2010s. The ICF coaches were replaced by the newer LHB coaches designed by Linke-Hofmann-Busch of Germany. In the 1960s, Electric multiple units (EMU) were developed for short-haul and local routes. In 2018, ICF rolled out a semi-high speed trainset designed to be equipped with fully air-conditioned coaches with modern facilities and capable of reaching speeds of over 160 km/h (99 mph). In the late 2010s, Indian Railways started upgrading the coaches of select trains from LHB to new Tejas coaches with enhanced features.

== Coaching stock ==
The Indian Railways offers various travel classes on its coaches and various freight wagons, apart from specialized and dedicated coaching stock for other uses. As of 2022, the Indian Railways' rolling stock consisted of 318,196 freight wagons and 84,863 passenger coaches. The coaches are manufactured by the following units:

Coach manufacturing units
Company	Location	Type	Established
Amzen Transportation Industries	New Delhi	Private	2008
BESCO	Kolkata	Private	1928
Braithwaite & Co.	Kolkata	PSU	1913
Bharat Heavy Electricals Limited	New Delhi	PSU	1956
BEML	Bangalore	PSU	1964
Bharat Wagon and Engineering	Patna	PSU	1978
Carriage Repair Workshop	Hubbali	State-owned	1885
Commercial Engineers & Body Builders	Jabalpur	Private	1979
Cimmco	Kolkata	Private	1943
Golden Rock Railway Workshop	Tiruchirappalli	State-owned	1928
Hindusthan Engineering & Industries	Kolkata	Private	1940
Integral Coach Factory	Chennai	State-owned	1955
Jamalpur Locomotive Workshop	Jamalpur	State-owned	1862
Jindal Rail Infrastructure	Vadodara	Private	2007
Jupiter Wagons	Kolkata	Private	1979
Marathwada Rail Coach Factory	Latur	State-owned	2020
Mechanical Workshop	Amritsar	State-owned	1901
Modern Coach Factory	Raebareli	State-owned	2012
Modern Industries	Ghaziabad	Private	1941
Oriental Rail Infrastructure	Mumbai	Private	1991
Rail Coach Factory	Kapurthala	State-owned	1985
Rail Coach Factory	Sonipat	State-owned	2022
Rail Wagon Workshop	Samastipur	State-owned	1881
SAIL–RITES Bengal Wagon Industry	Kolkata	PSU	2010
Titagarh Rail Systems	Kolkata	Private	1984
Texmaco Rail & Engineering	Kolkata	Private	1939

== Passenger ==
=== First AC (1A) ===
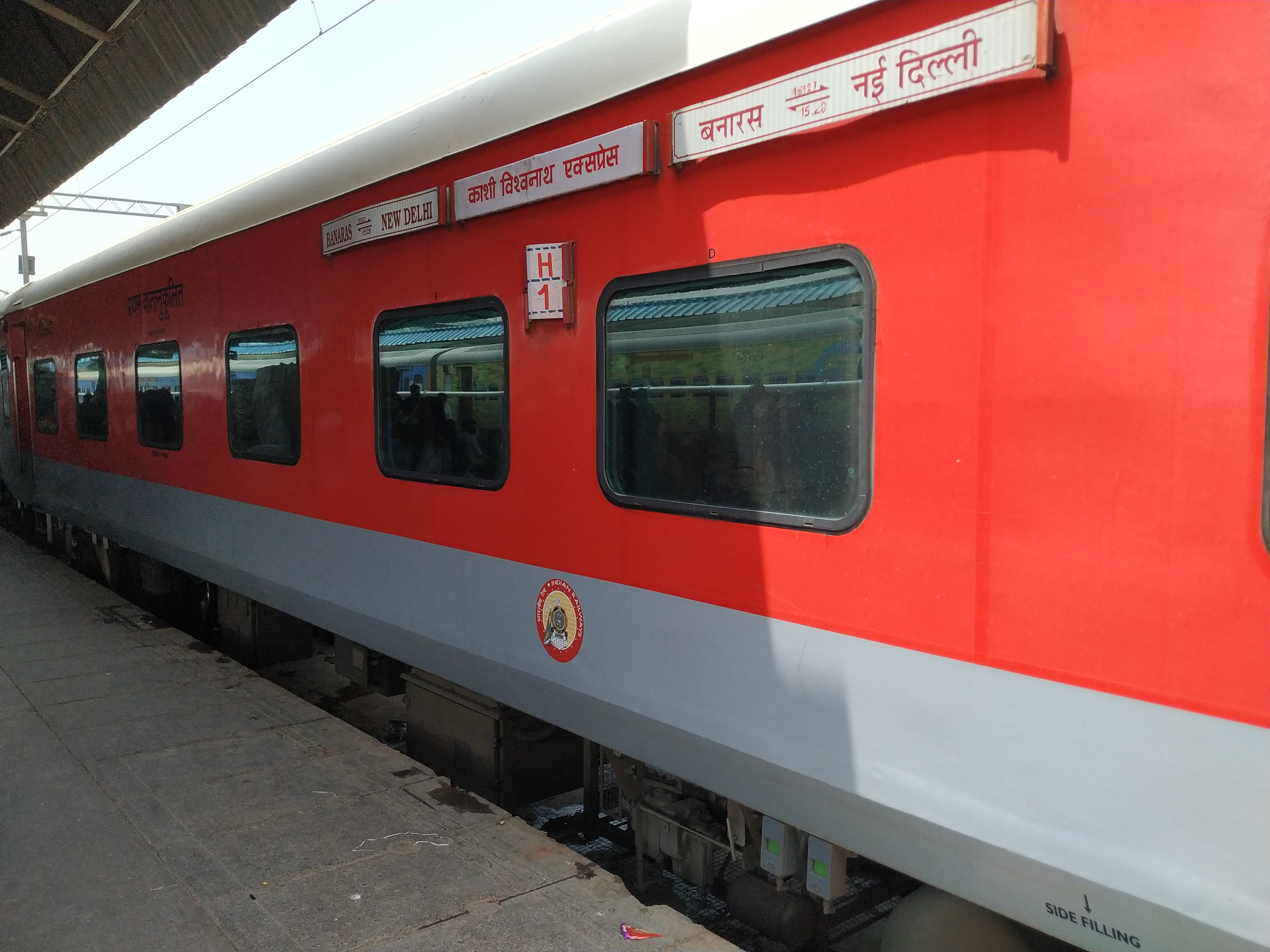
Exterior

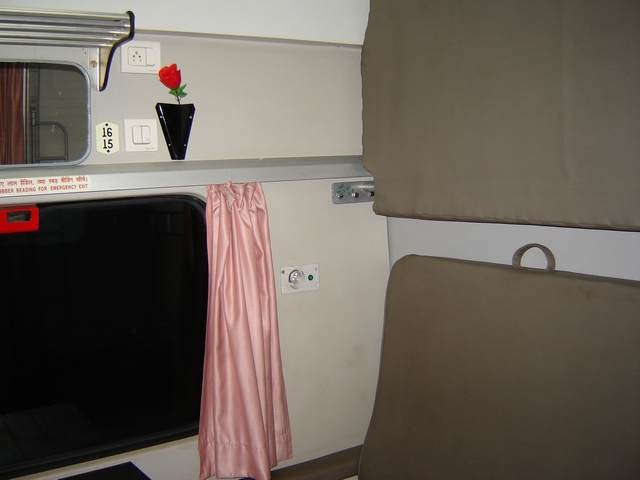
Interior

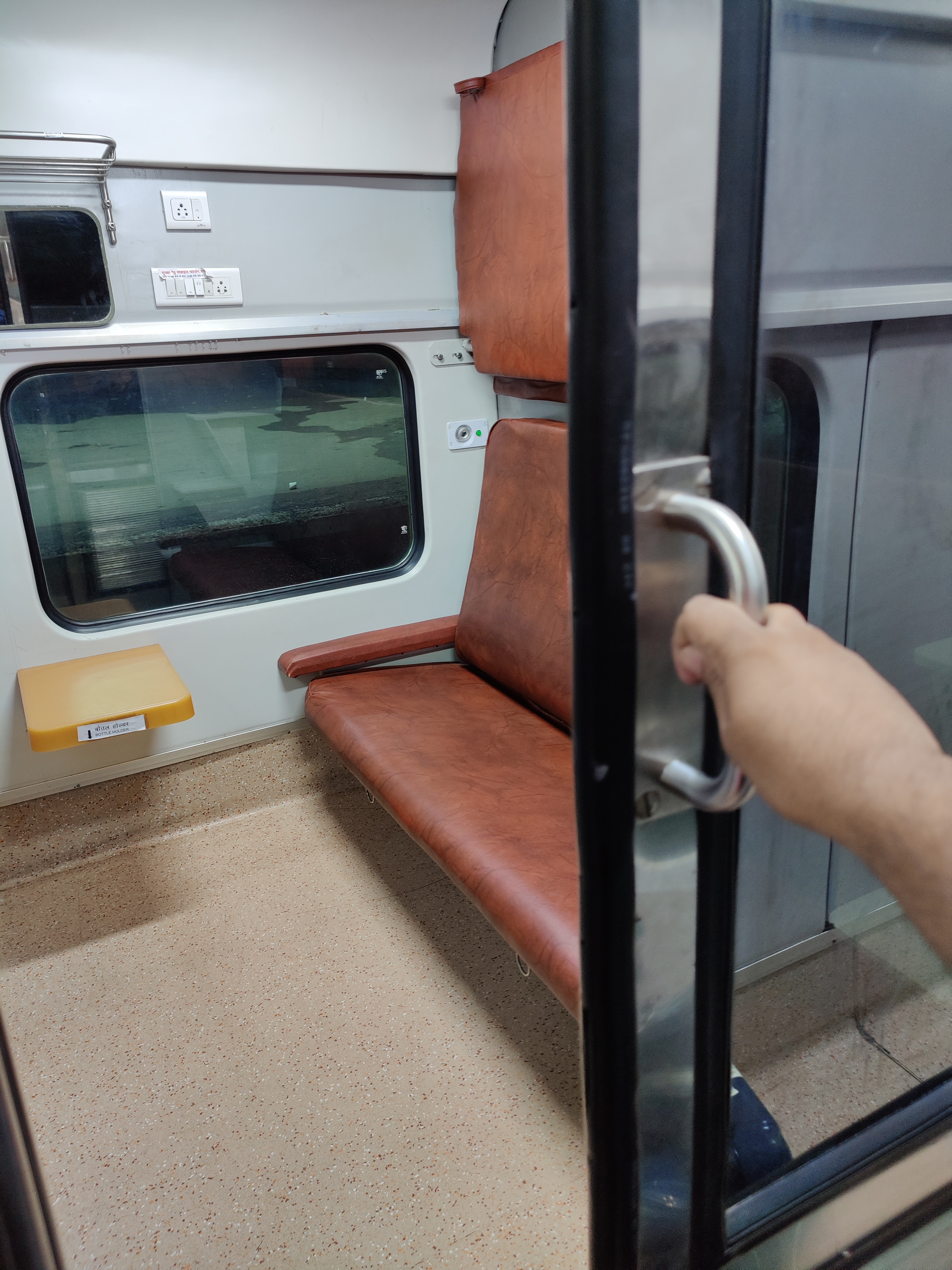
Coupe

First AC coaches are the most luxurious and expensive class in most express trains. They have separate compartments with private lockable doors. The compartments are air-conditioned and are lined along one side with the walkway along the other side of the aisle. The first-class compartments can have cabins (two sets of berths facing each other) or coupes (single set of berths) with bedding. There are five cabins and three coupes with a total capacity of 26 passengers. While there are shower facilities provided in the coach, some trains have dedicated wash basins inside the compartments. The coaches have a dedicated attendant and often have a dedicated menu for meals. Meals are served on plates and with cutlery in select trains. Passengers are allowed a luggage allowance of 150 kg per person.

=== First-class (FC) ===
First-class coaches in express trains were similar to first AC coaches with a combination of cabins and berths. They are non-air-conditioned and do not have all the facilities of first AC coaches. They began to be phased out of normal express trains starting in the 2000s and the last coach was de-commissioned in 2015. First class is still in use in toy trains where the coaches consist of seats similar to chair cars.

=== Executive Anubhuti (EA) ===
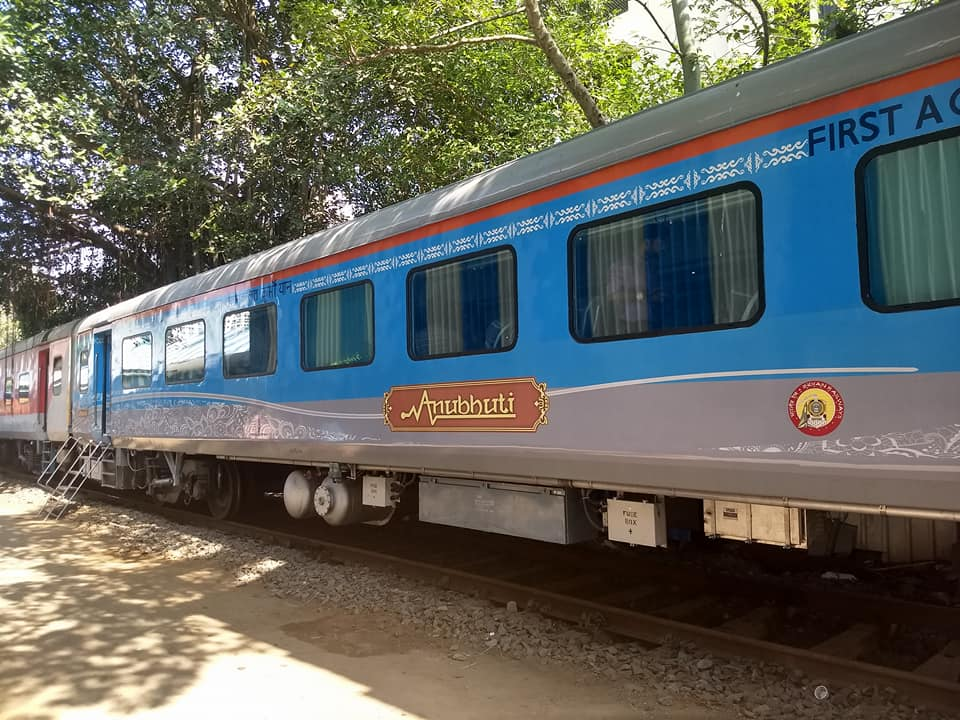
Exterior

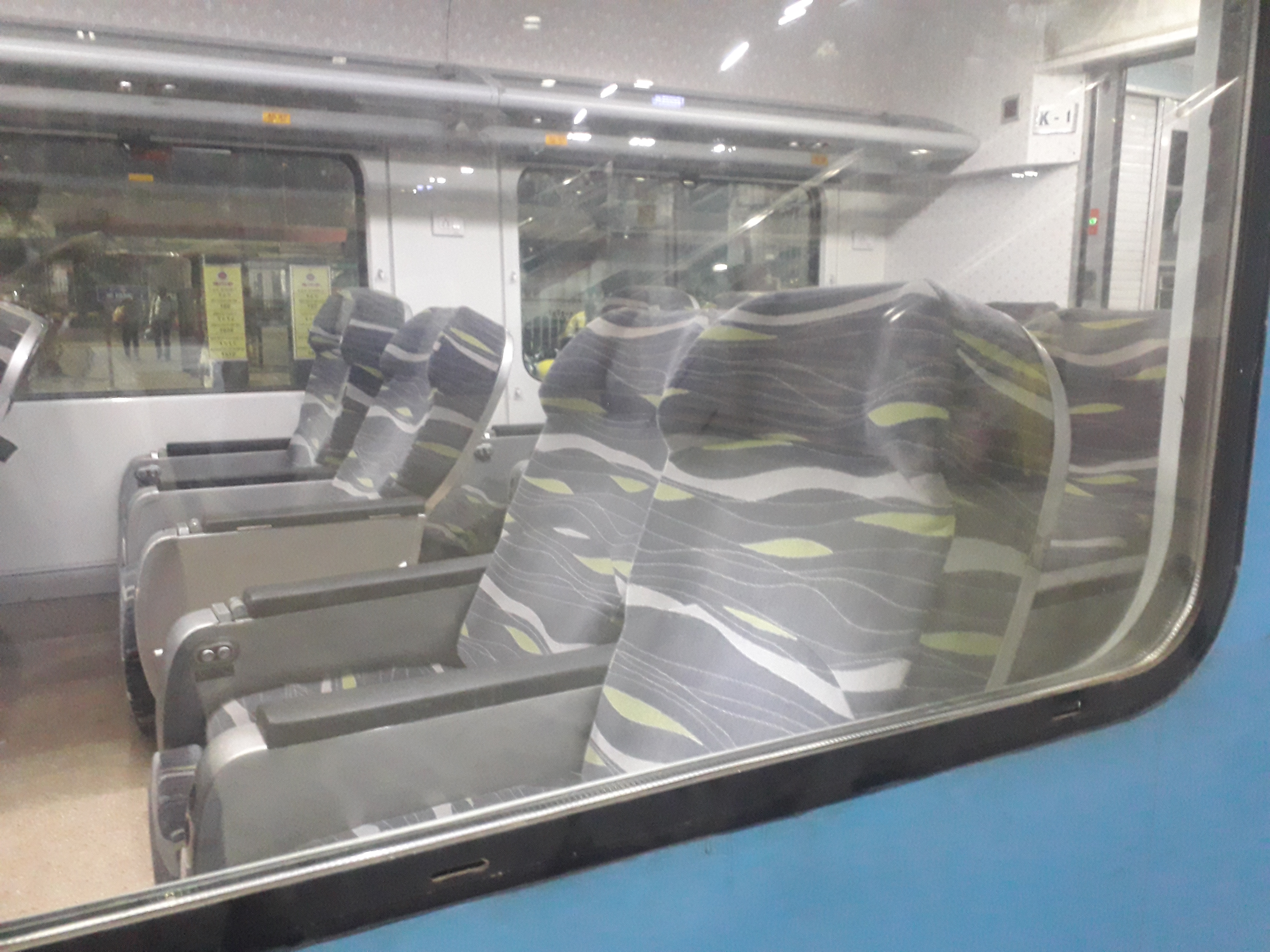
Interior

Executive Anubhuti is the premium class of chair car and is equipped with retractable seats in 2x2 configuration. The coaches are air-conditioned and have a capacity to seat 56 passengers. The coaches have wide windows and large, cushioned seats with leg and armrests similar to business class seats in aircraft. The seats are equipped with a LCD and entertainment system with large luggage compartments. The seats have dedicated LED reading lights, power sockets and call buttons. The coaches are equipped with modular bio toilets with automated taps, hand driers and soap dispensers. The exterior and parts of interior are covered with anti-graffiti vinyl wrapping. The coaches are equipped with a passenger information system. Meals are often provided as a part of the journey ticket. The class is available only in select trains.

=== AC Executive Class (EC) ===
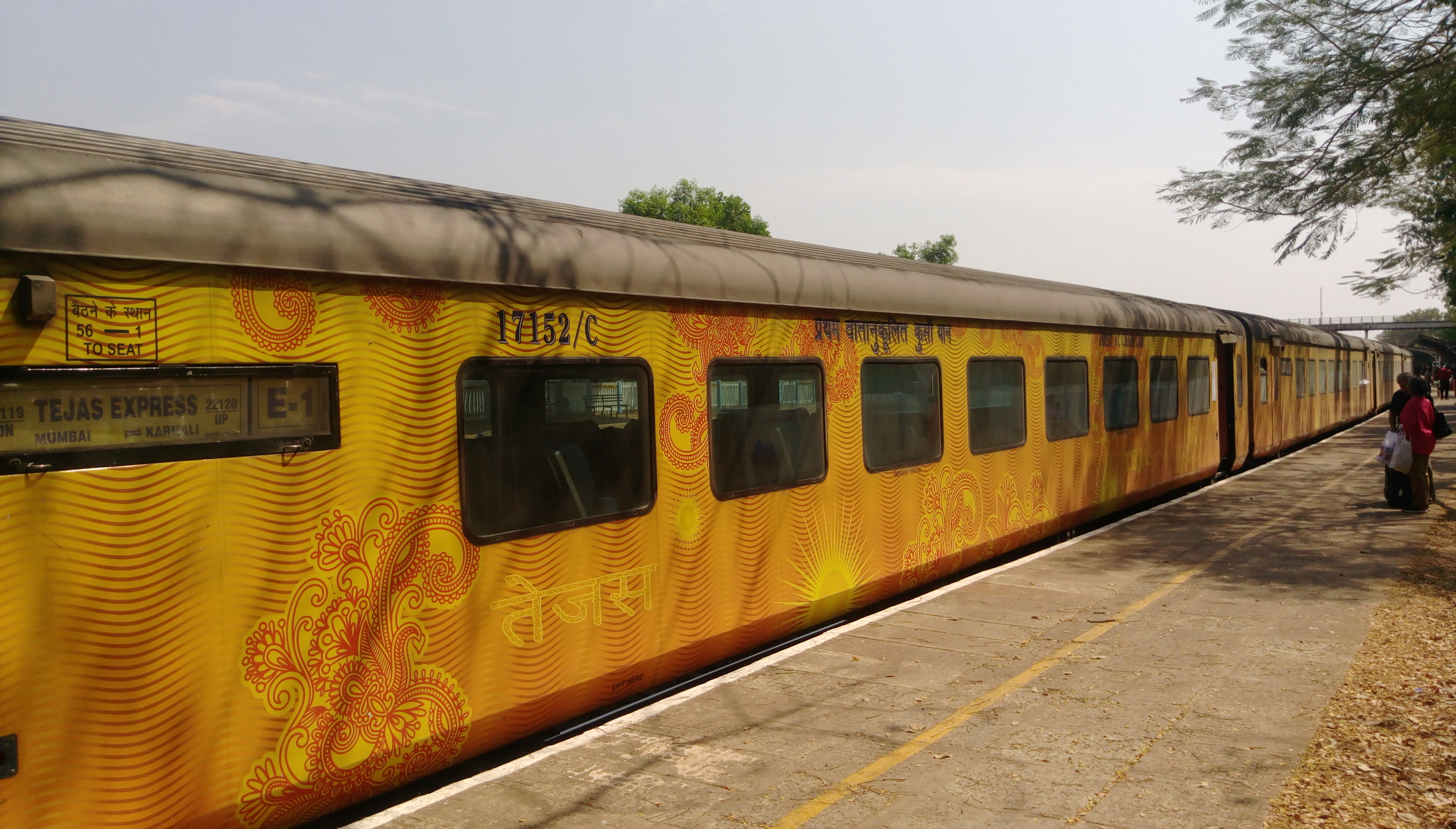
Exterior

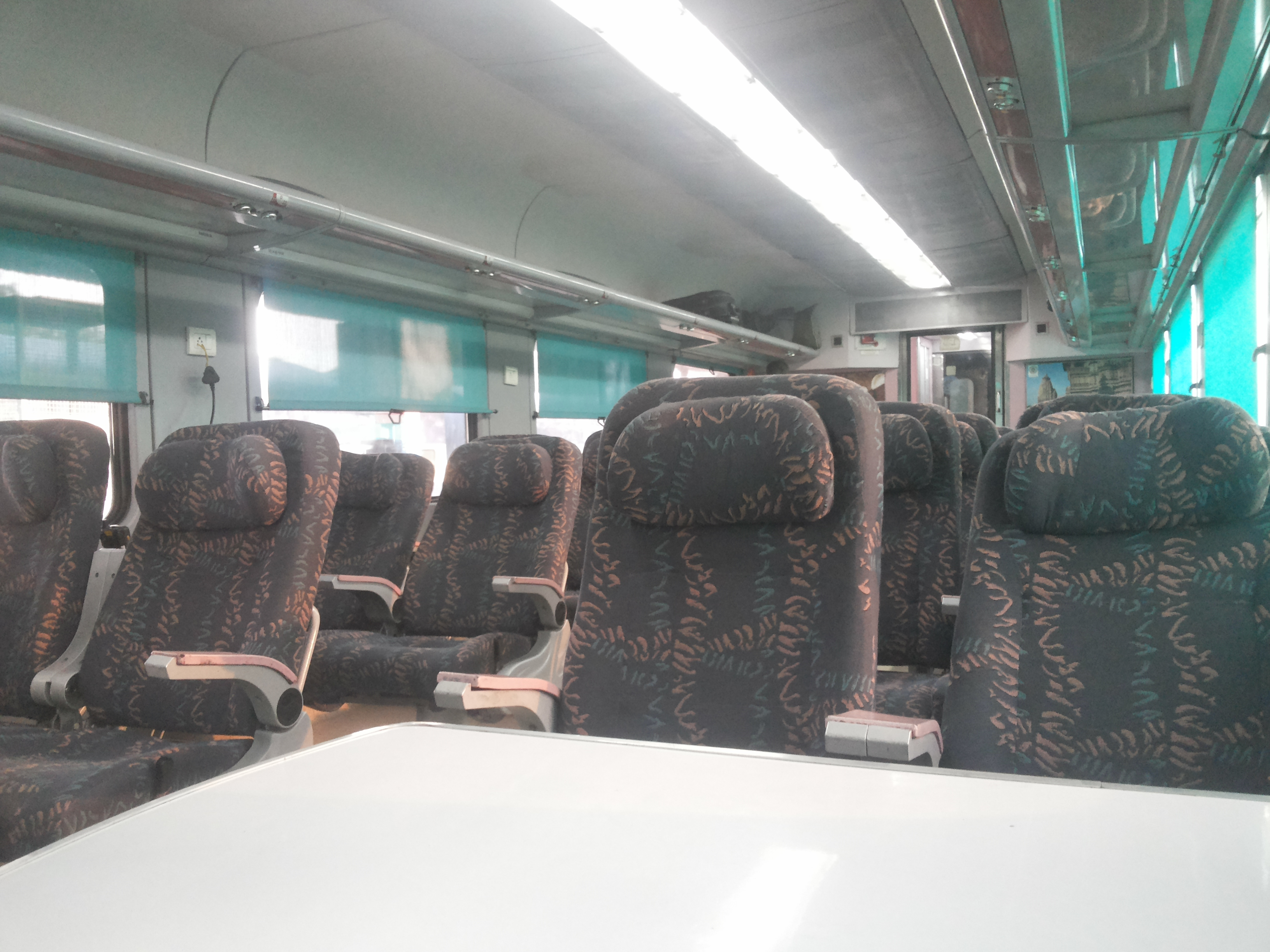
Interior

AC Executive Class is often the top most class of chair car in express trains. It is equipped with retractable seats in 2x2 configuration. The coaches are air-conditioned and have a capacity to seat 46 passengers. The coaches have large, cushioned seats with leg and armrests equipped with tray tables. The seats have dedicated LED reading lights and power sockets. The coaches are equipped with modular bio toilets with automated taps, hand driers and soap dispensers. Meals are often provided as a part of the journey ticket. In Vande Bharat Express trains, the coach has a capacity to seat 52 passengers and are equipped with more features including rotating seats, CCTVs, passenger information system, larger toilets, USB ports and automated doors.

=== Second AC or AC 2-tier (2A) ===
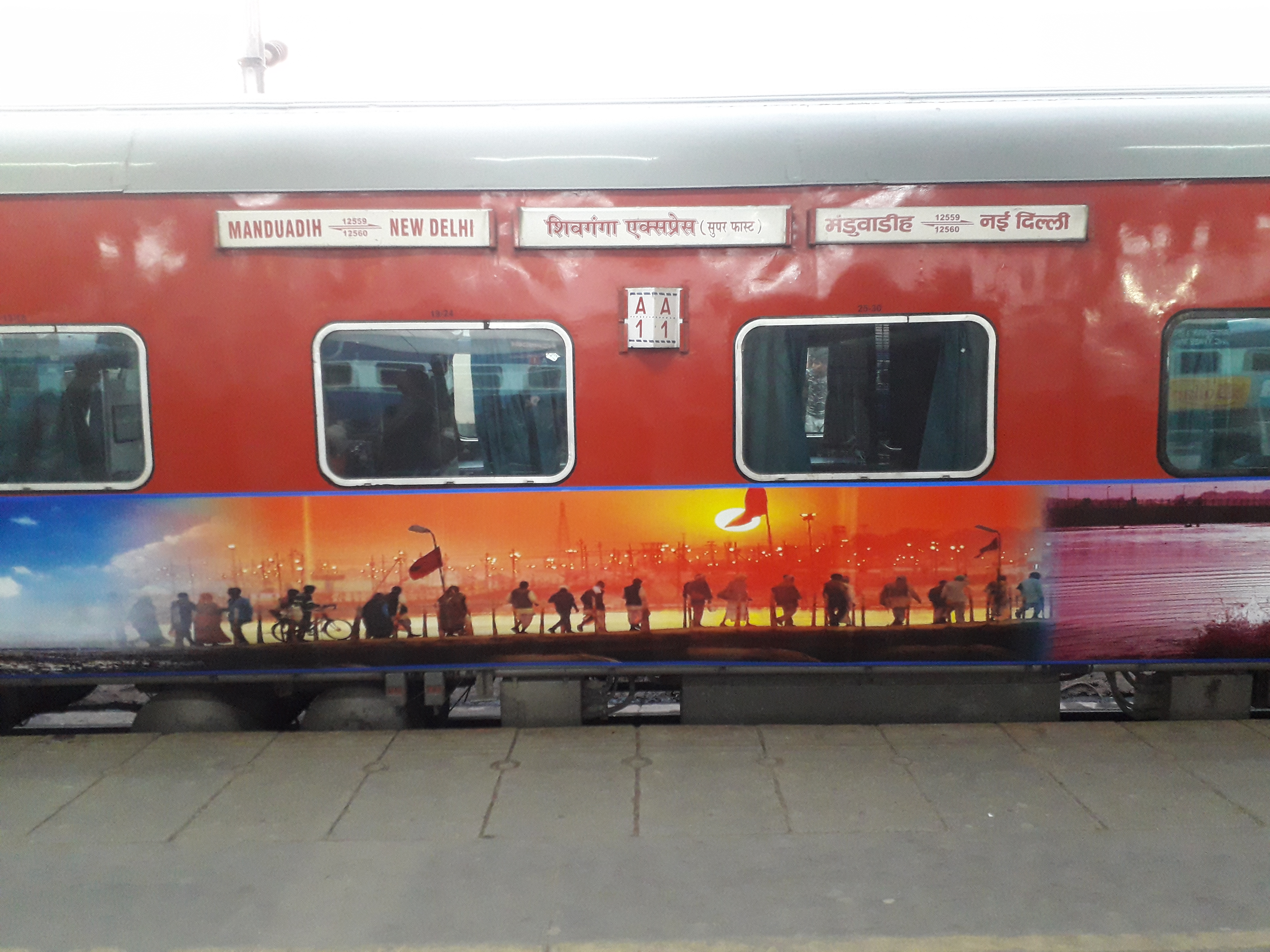
Exterior

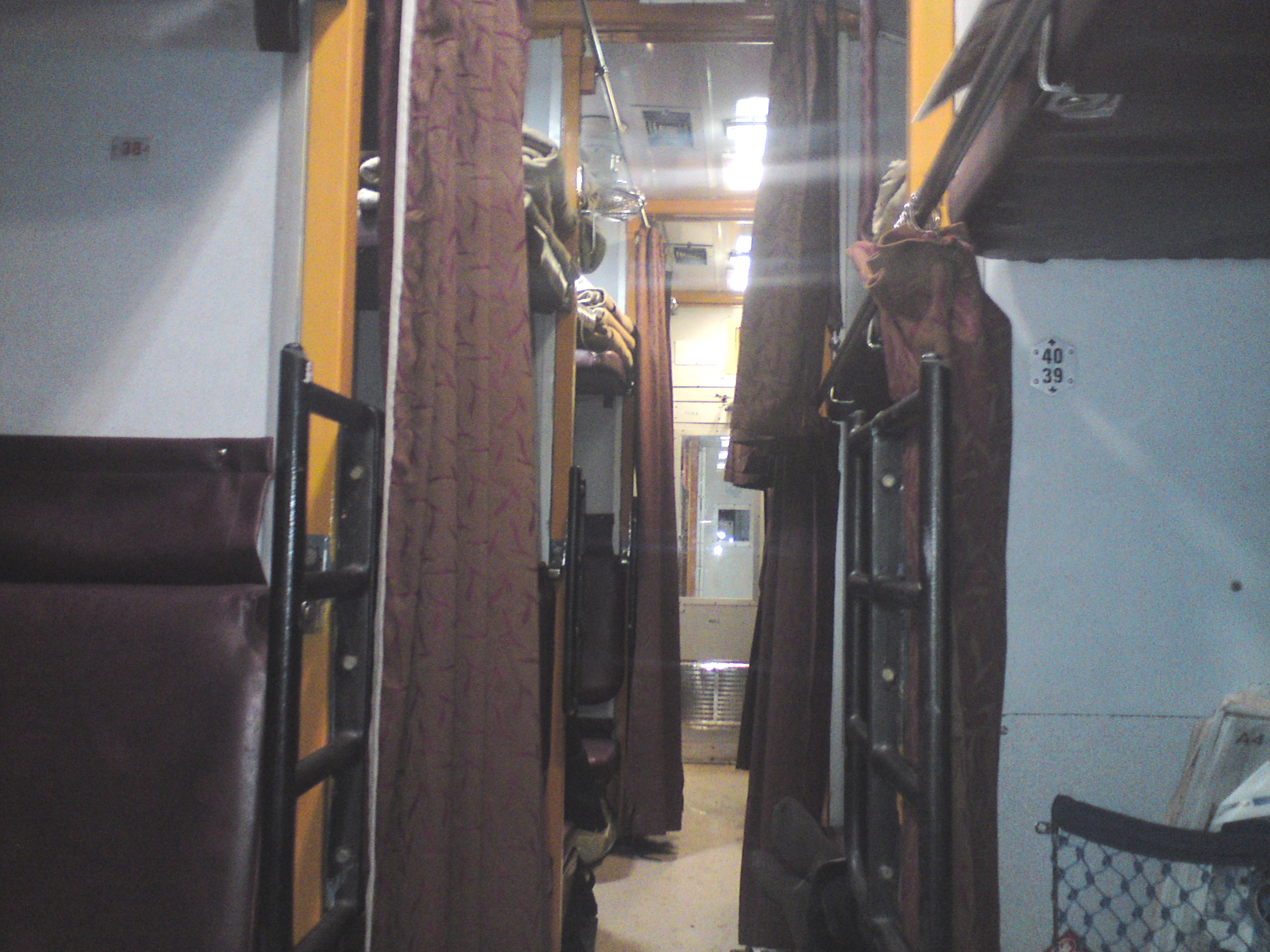
Interior

Second AC or AC 2-tier is an air-conditioned sleeping car with wide sealed windows. There are four berths arranged in two-tiers facing each other in a single bay with two-tiered berths arranged on the sides lengthwise across the corridor for a total of 46 to 54 berths per coach. The coaches have four entry or exit doors and four lavatories. There are separate curtains provided at individual berths for privacy. the individual berths are equipped with reading lights and charging sockets. A simple bedding with blankets and a pillow is provided. Food is available on order or as a part of the ticket depending on the train. The allowed luggage allowance is 100 kg per passenger.

=== AC First Class cum AC 2-tier (HA) ===
AC First Class cum AC 2 Tier is a hybrid configuration coach consisting of combination of two classes in a single coach. There are ten seats of AC first class consisting of two cabins of four berths and a coupe of two berths along with 20 berths of AC 2-tier.

=== Third AC or AC 3-tier (3A) ===
Exterior

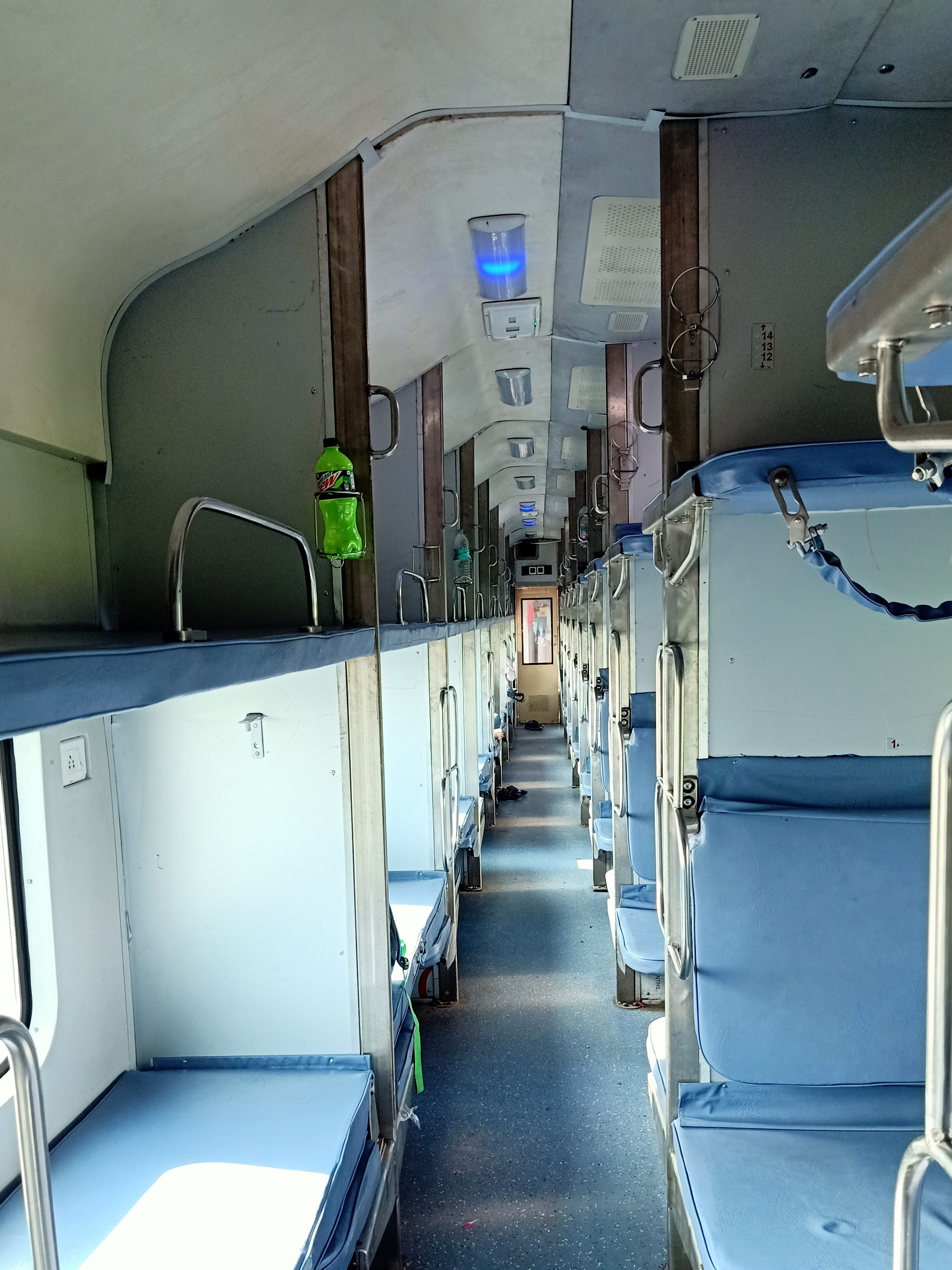
Interior

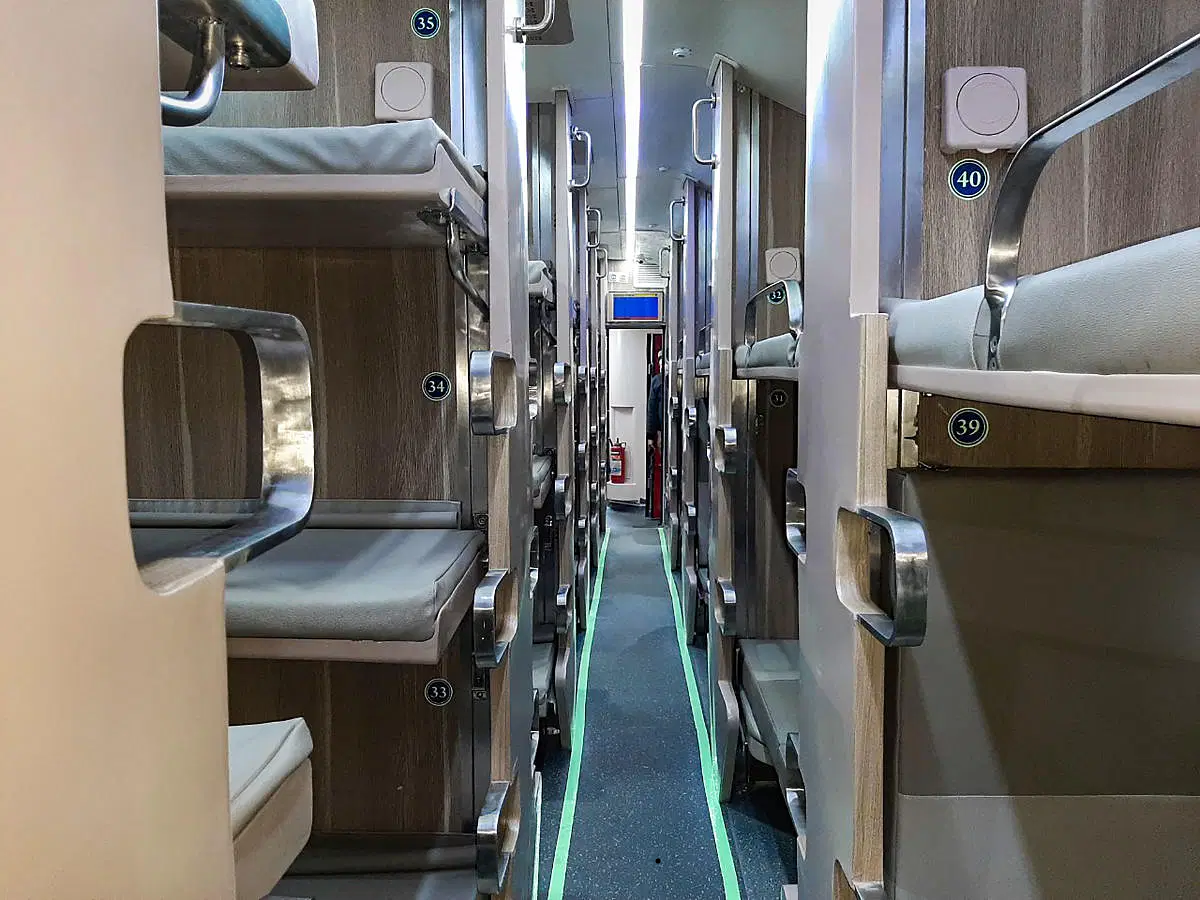
3-tier economy

Third AC or AC 3-tier is an air-conditioned sleeping car. There are six berths arranged in three-tiers facing each other in a single bay with foldable middle berths and two-tiered berths arranged on the sides lengthwise across the corridor for a total of 64 to 72 berths per coach. The coaches have four entry or exit doors and four lavatories. Separate curtains were provided earlier but were removed due to safety issues. There are common charging sockets and lights in each compartment. A simple bedding with blankets and a pillow is provided. Food is available on order or as a part of the ticket depending on the train with the same menu shared with AC 2-tier. The allowed luggage allowance is 40 kg per passenger.

=== AC 3-tier economy (3E) ===
AC 3-tier economy coaches are air-conditioned sleeping cars similar to AC 3-tier. Compared to 3-tier coaches (72 berths), they have a capacity of 81 passengers per coach. Bedding is available for rent and the coaches have facilities like separate AC duct for each berth, flexible bottle stands, reading lamps, charging slots etc.

=== Chair car (CC) ===
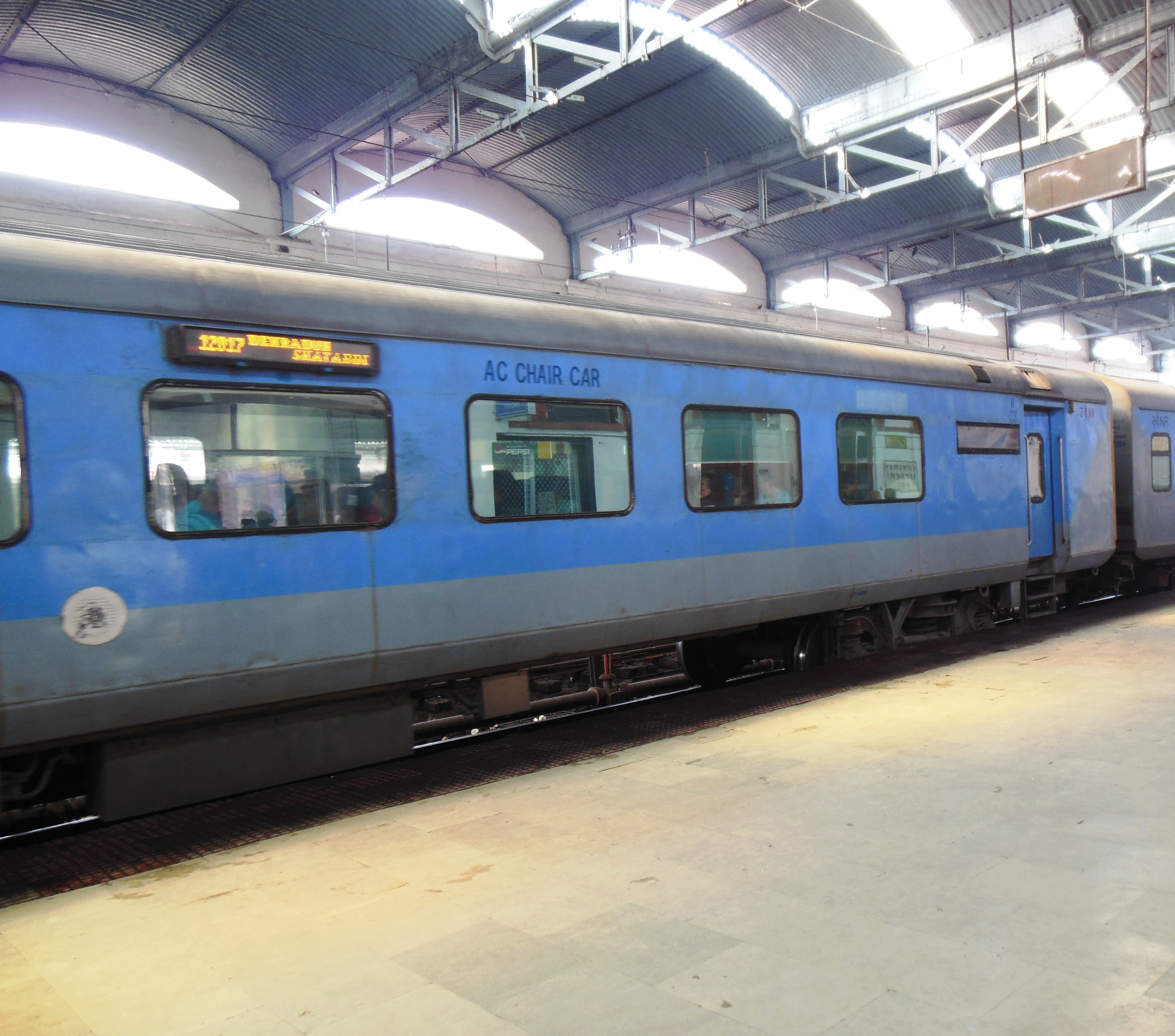
Exterior

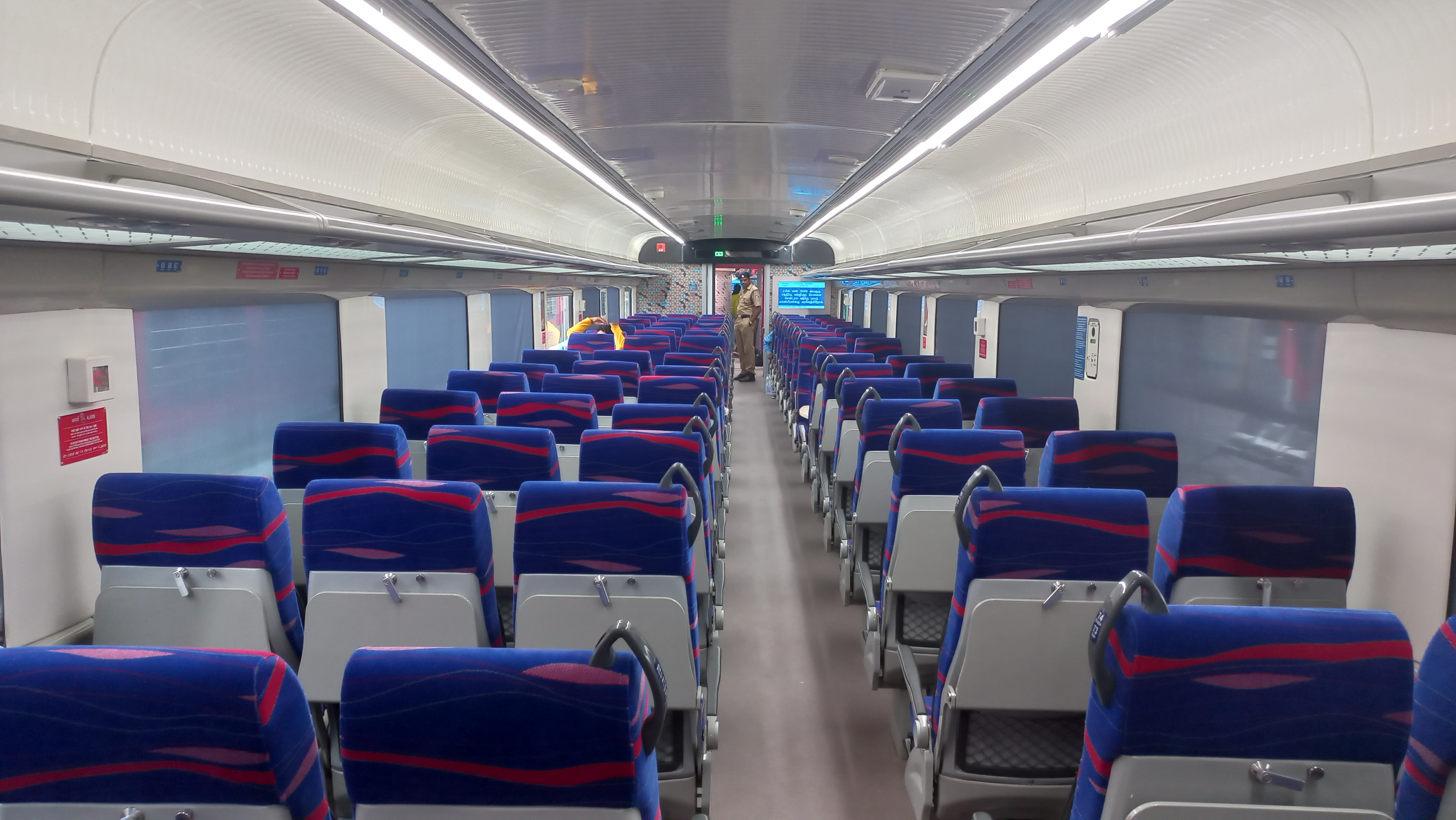
Interior

AC chair car or chair car are air-conditioned coaches equipped with retractable seats and sealed windows. There are five seats in each row in 3x2 configuration with a total capacity of 73 to 78 passengers per coach. The coaches have cushioned seats with leg and armrests equipped with tray tables. The coaches are equipped with four entry or exit doors with sliding doors leading to the seating areas and four lavatories. The coaches are also equipped with LED reading lights, power sockets along the window side and luggage storage racks. Meals are provided as a part of the journey ticket in select trains. The allowed luggage allowance is 40 kg per passenger. In Vande Bharat Express trains, the coach has a capacity to seat 78 passengers and are equipped with more features including passenger information system, CCTVs, larger toilets and automated doors.

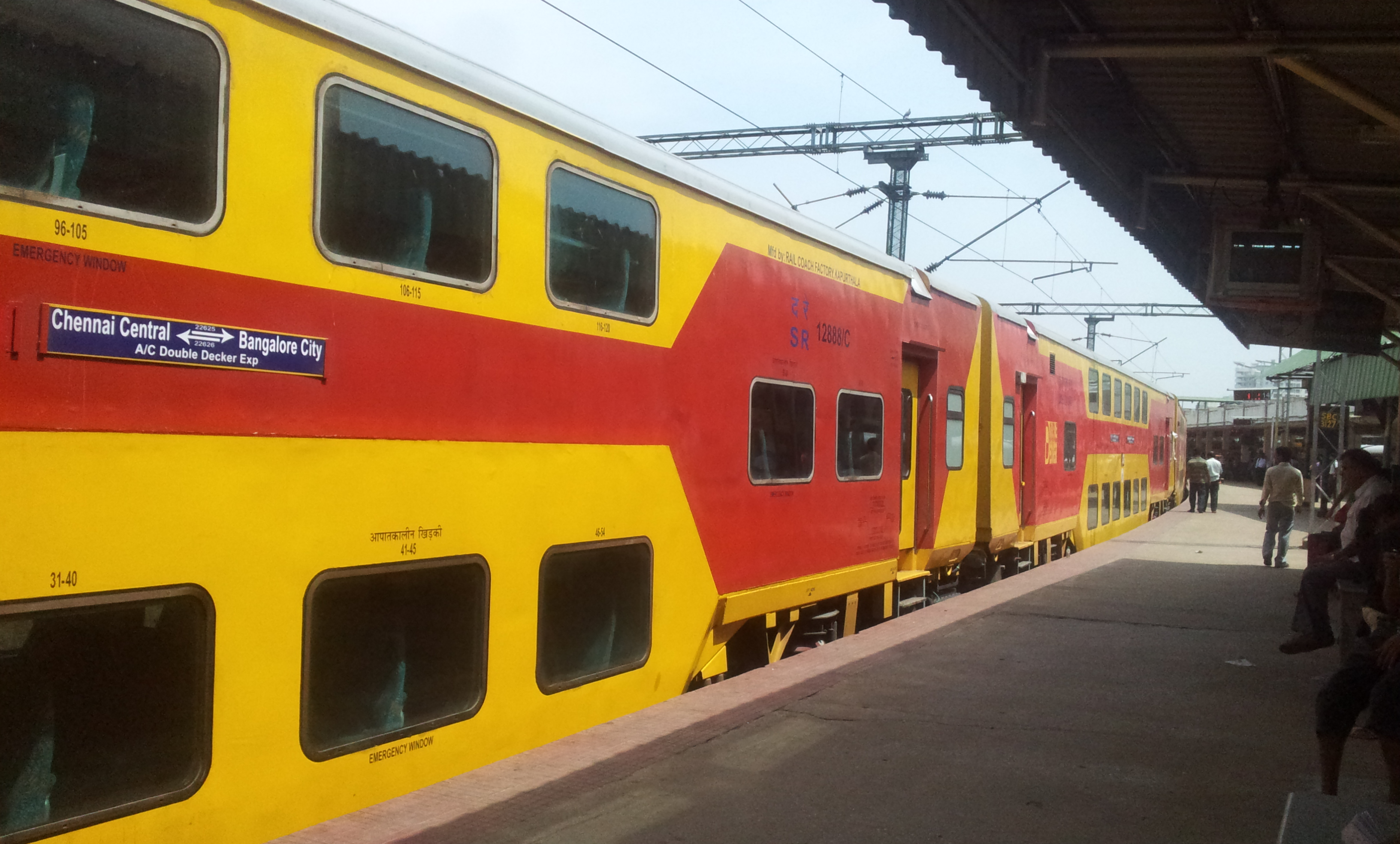
Double-decker

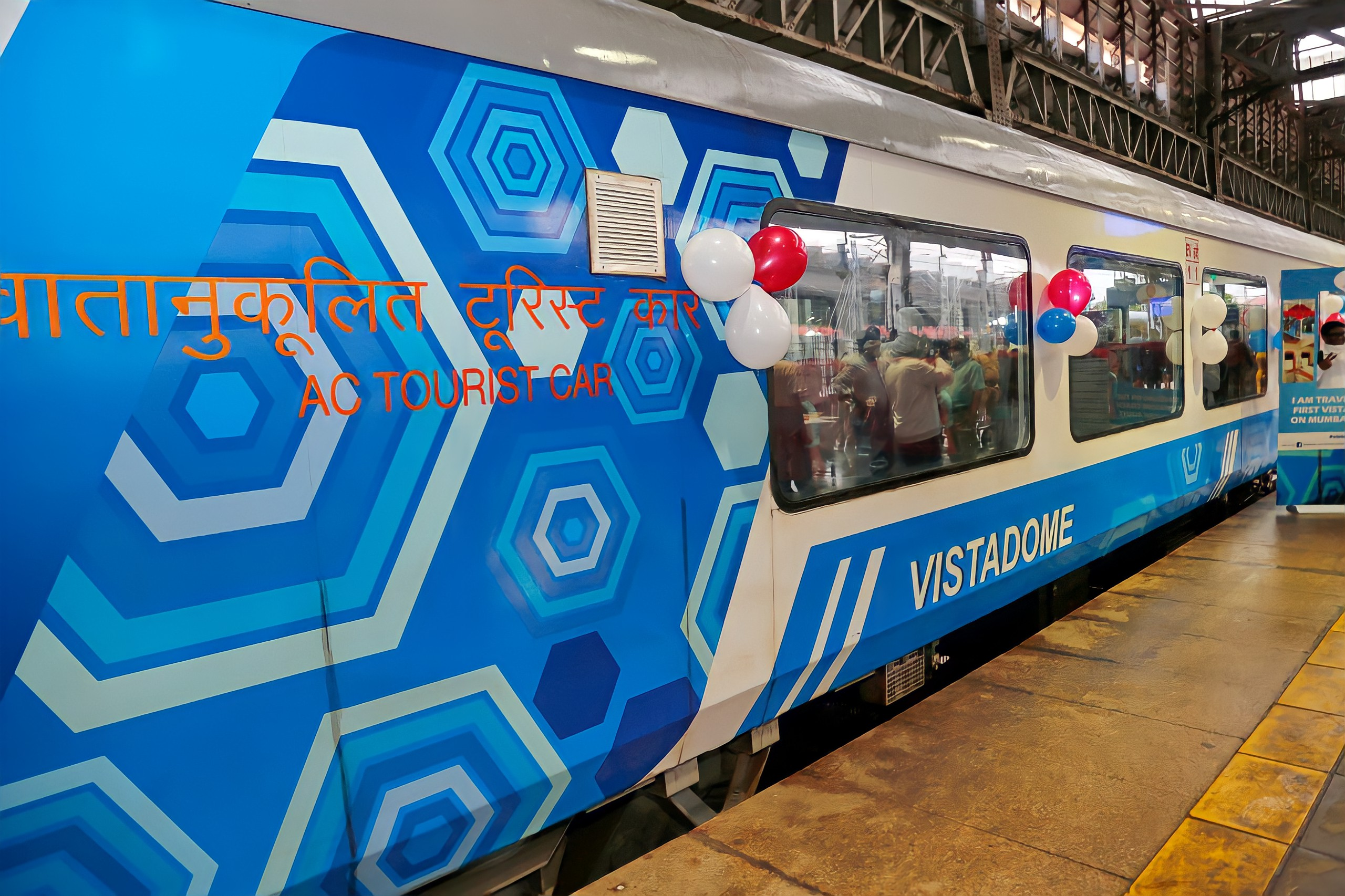
Vistadome (exterior)

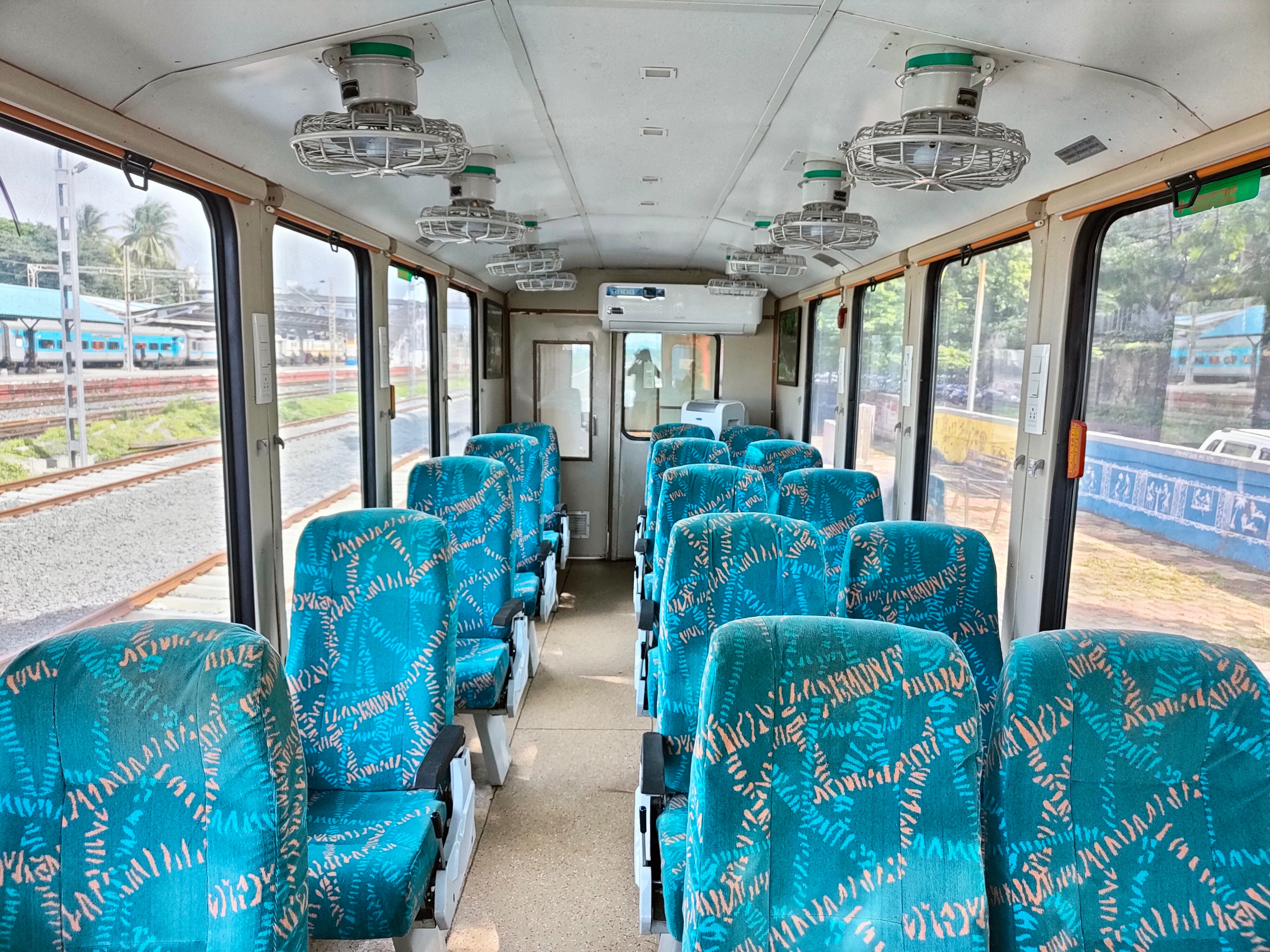
Vistadome (interior)

Double-decker

Double Decker coaches have similar seats to a chair car but have seats on two levels with the decks accessible via staircases inside each coach. These coaches are taller than normal coaches at 4,366 mm (171.9 in) and can seat up to 120 passengers per coach. These coaches are run on dedicated double decker trains.

AC Tourist car

AC Tourist cars have vistadome coaches with glass roofs and extra wide windows. The interiors are similar to AC chair car coaches. Select trains operating mostly on tourist circuits are equipped with such coaches. Indian Railways plans to introduce these coaches in all mountain railways.

=== Sleeper (SL) ===
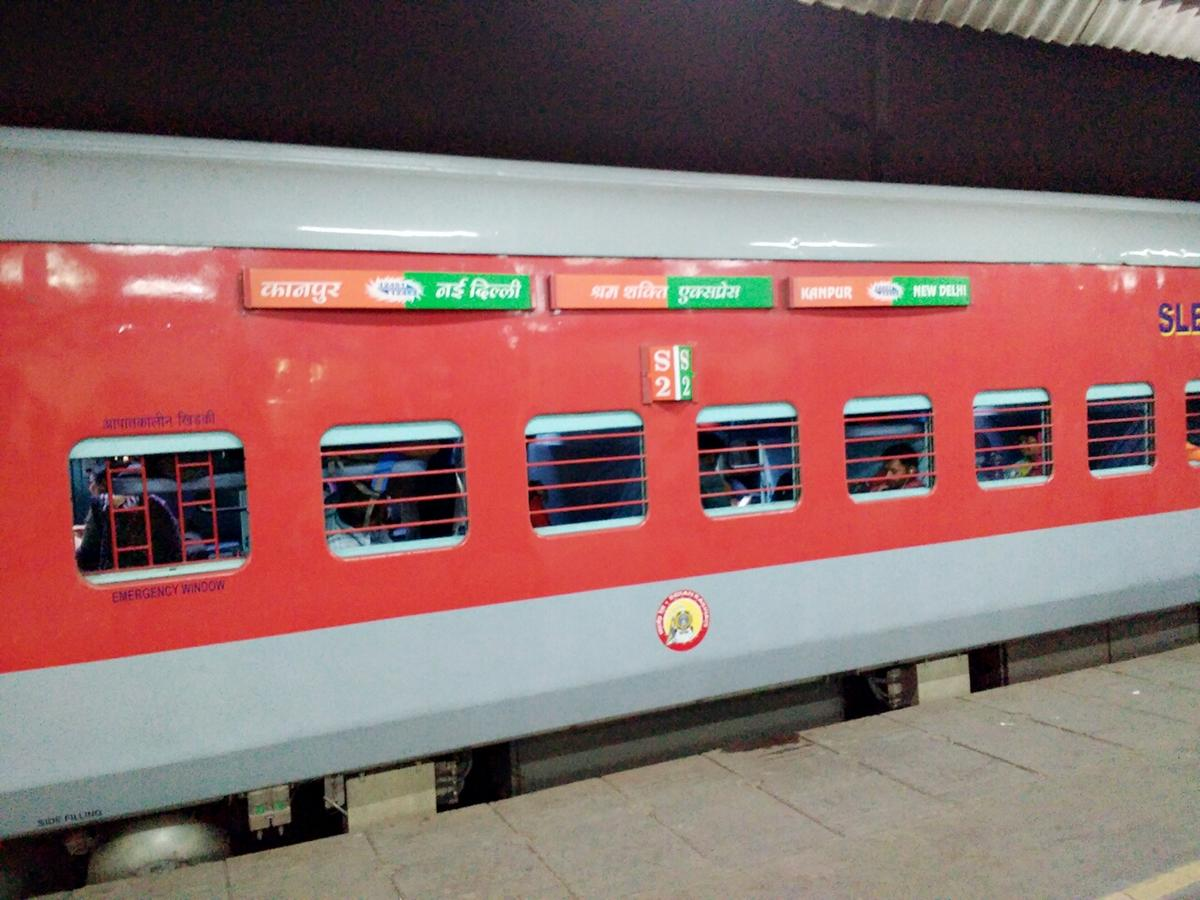
Exterior

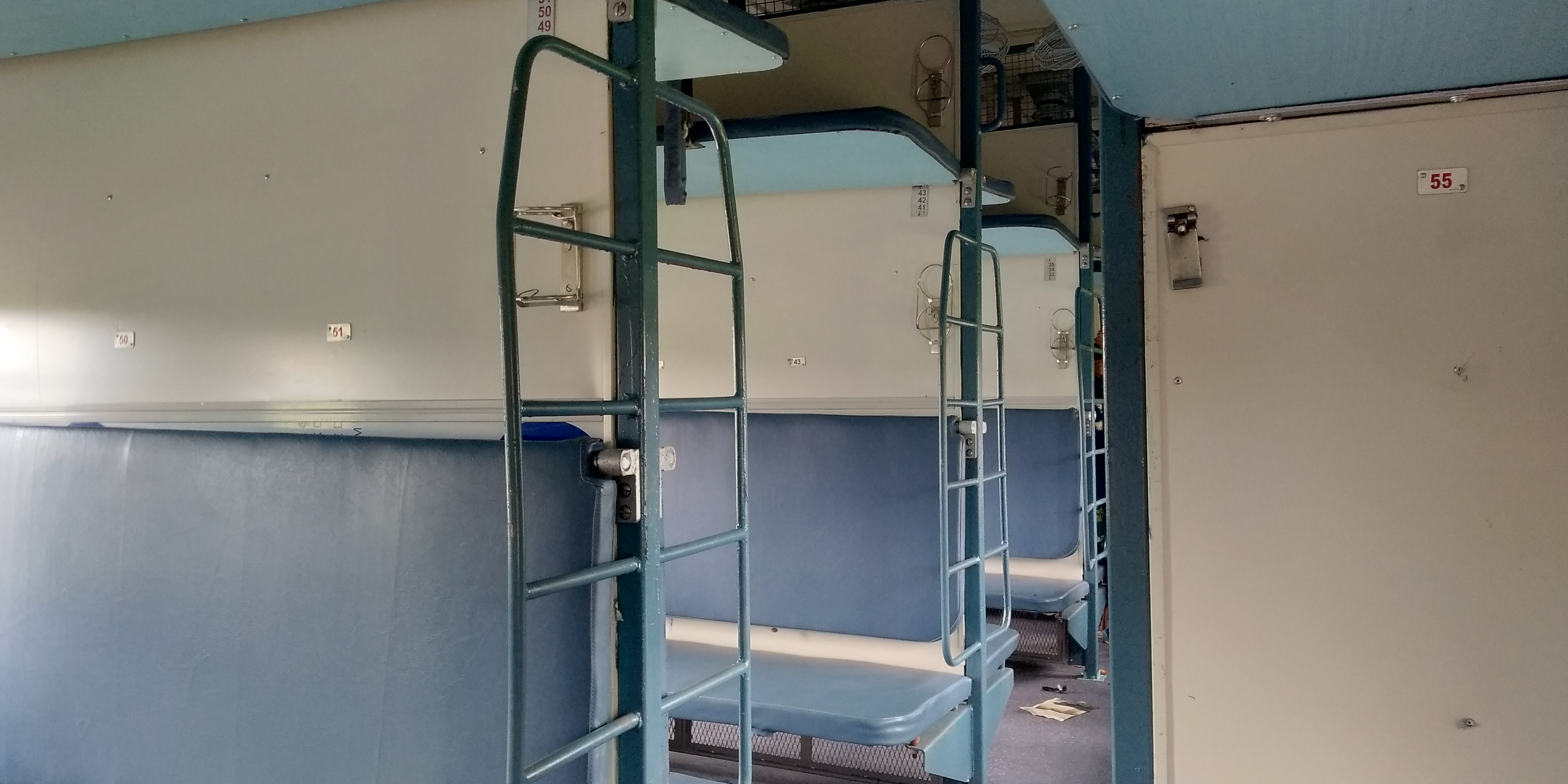
Interior

Sleeper class is the most common sleeping car coach in Indian Railways. There are six berths arranged in three-tiers facing each other in a single bay with foldable middle berths and two-tiered berths arranged on the sides lengthwise across the corridor. The coaches have a capacity of 72 to 81 berths per coach. The coaches are not air-conditioned and have open-able windows. There are common charging sockets, ceiling mounted fans and lights in each compartment. Food is available on order or can be purchased from vendors. The allowed luggage allowance is 80 kg per passenger.

=== Second Sitting (2S) ===
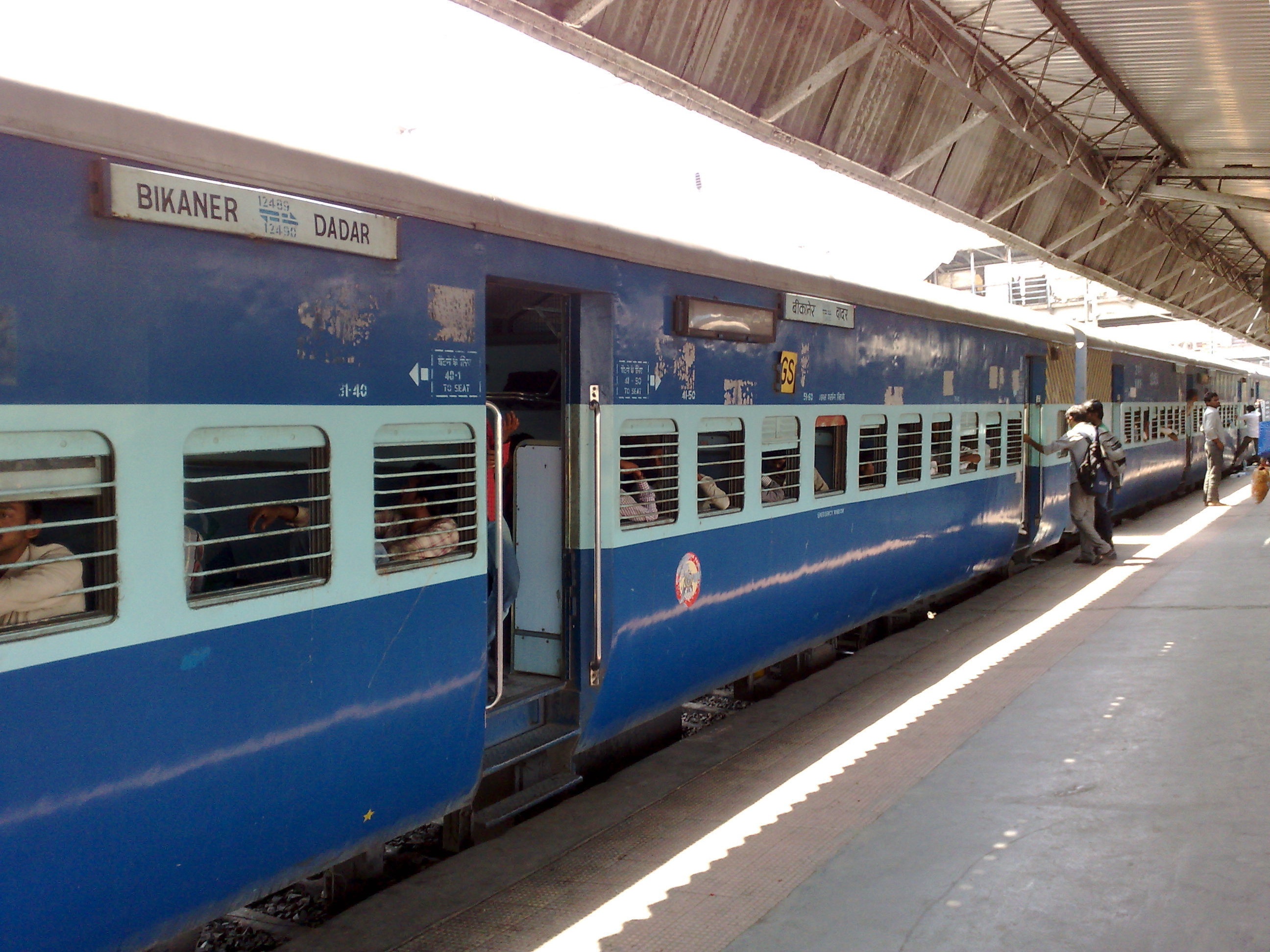
Exterior

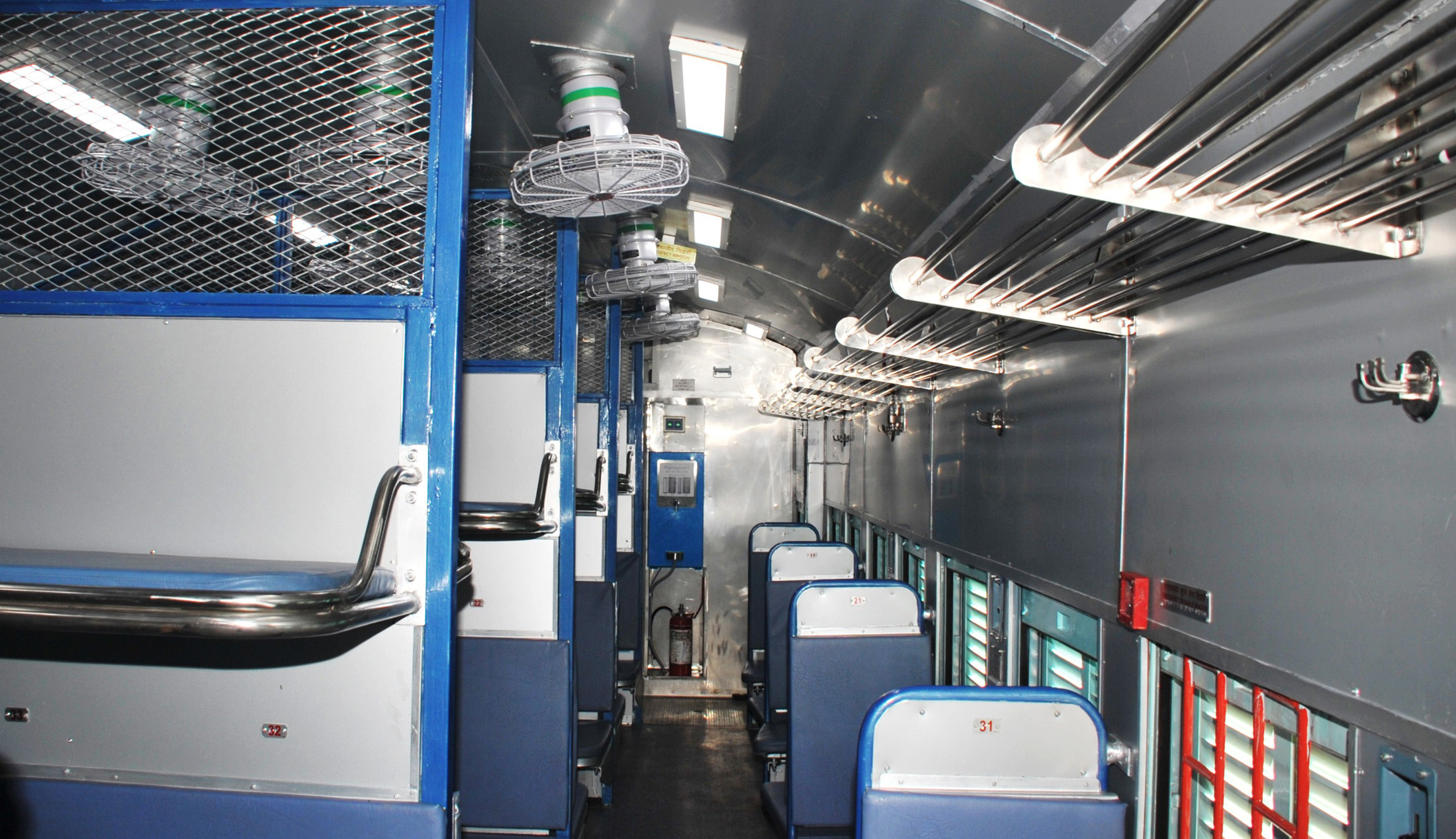
Interior (opposing seats)

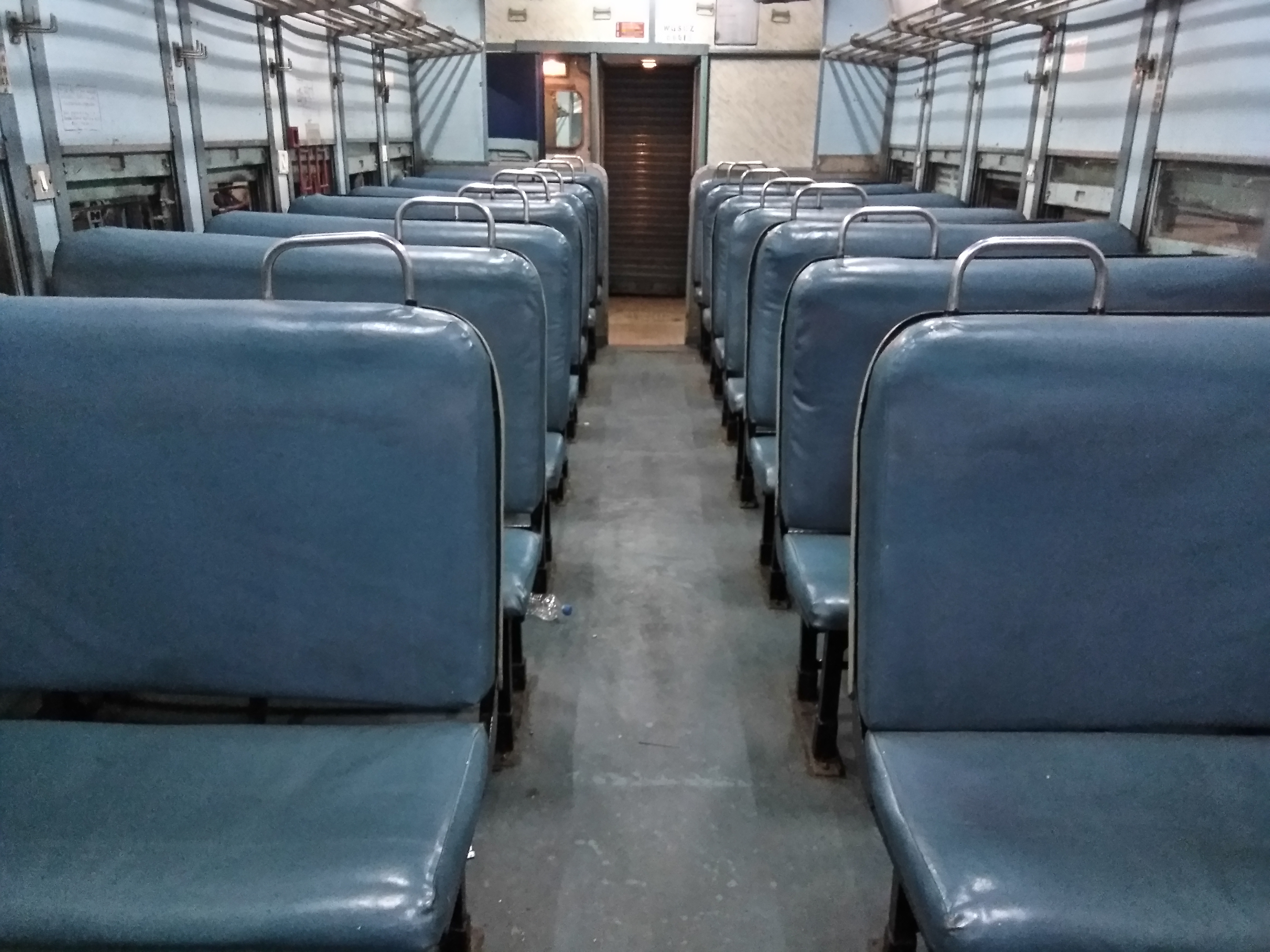
Interior

Second sitting is the most common chair car coach and the cheapest in the Indian Railways. These coaches have a seating capacity of 108 while Jan Shatabdi trains have 103 seats per coach. It is common in most day-time running trains with six seats arranged in 3x3 configuration. The seats may face each other or towards the same side. The coaches are not air-conditioned and have open-able windows. There are common charging sockets, ceiling mounted fans and lights in each compartment. Food is available on order or can be purchased from vendors. The allowed luggage allowance is 70 kg per passenger.

Unreserved (UR)/General (GS)

Unreserved or general coaches are second seating coaches which are not available for reservation and seats are taken on available basis. One or more of these coaches are attached to express trains while dedicated passenger trains might also have all unreserved coaches. Tickets are valid on any train on a route only for within 24 hours of purchase.

=== Suburban and local ===
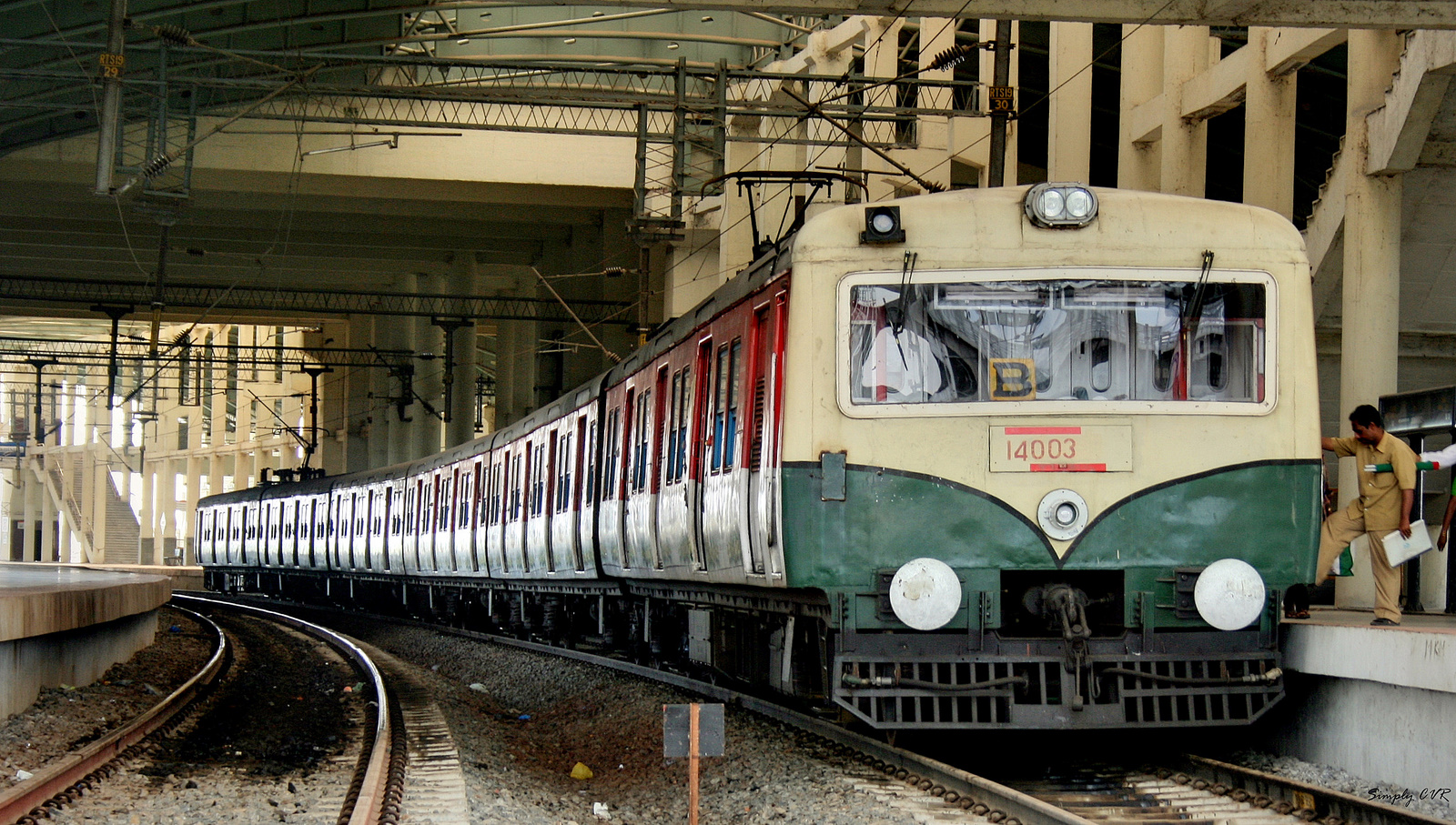
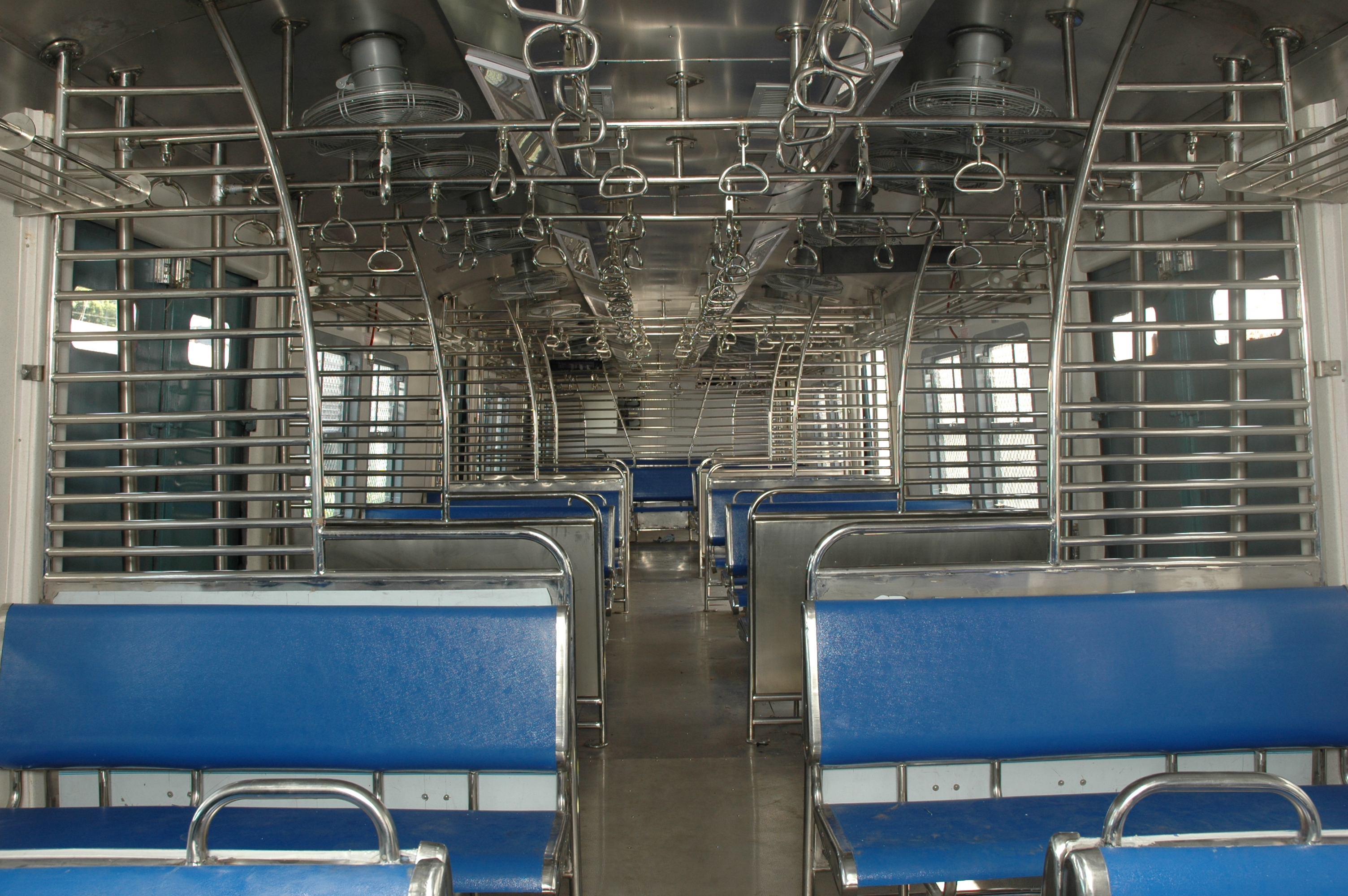
A typical Electric multiple unit (EMU) train-set used in suburban rail (left) and interior showing seating configuration

Suburban rail systems use Electric multiple unit (EMU) and Diesel electric multiple unit (DEMU) train-sets which have a set of motor coaches powering the train-set interspersed with passenger coaches. The motor coaches have a reduced seating capacity than normal coaches. The coaches have large entry and exit on both sides with multiple sets of seats arranged in various configurations. MEMU trains which are used for short-distance inter-city routes also have a similar configuration. Each train-set may have one or two first class coaches with better seats. These coaches are generally non-air conditioned while there are air-conditioned coaches used in select routes.

=== Special and luxury ===
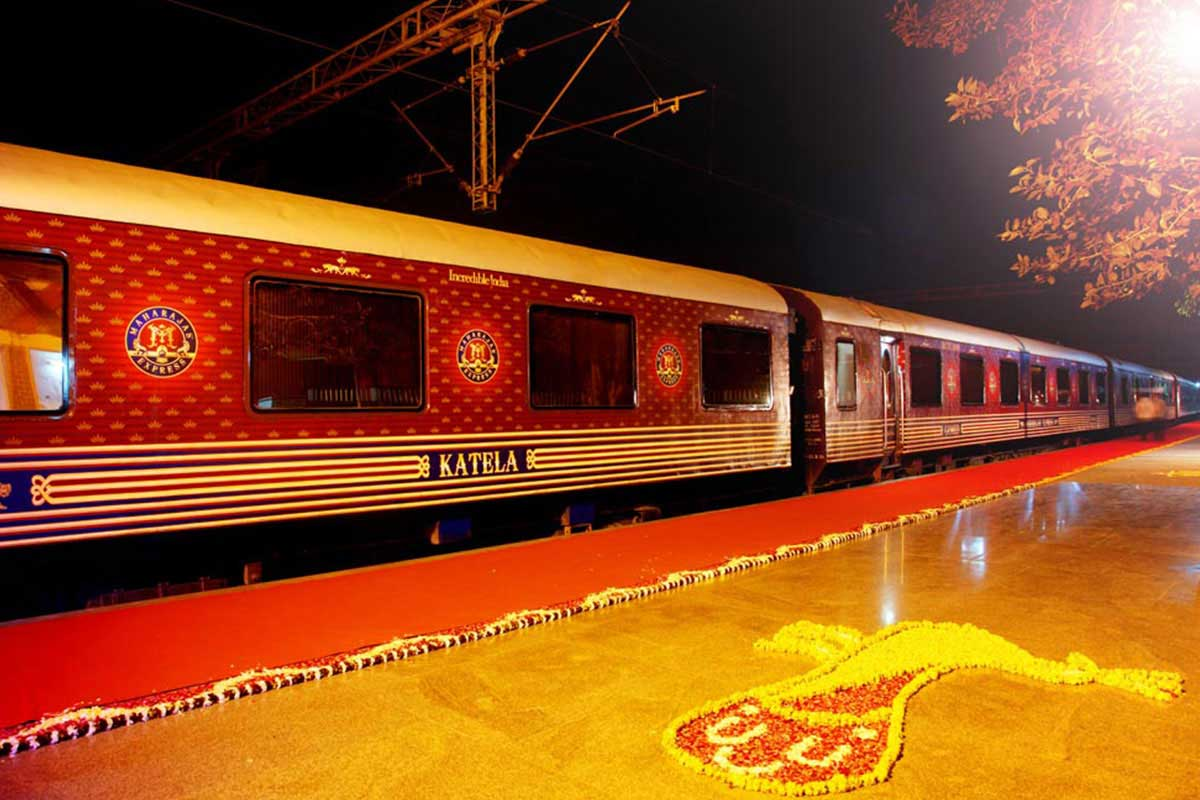
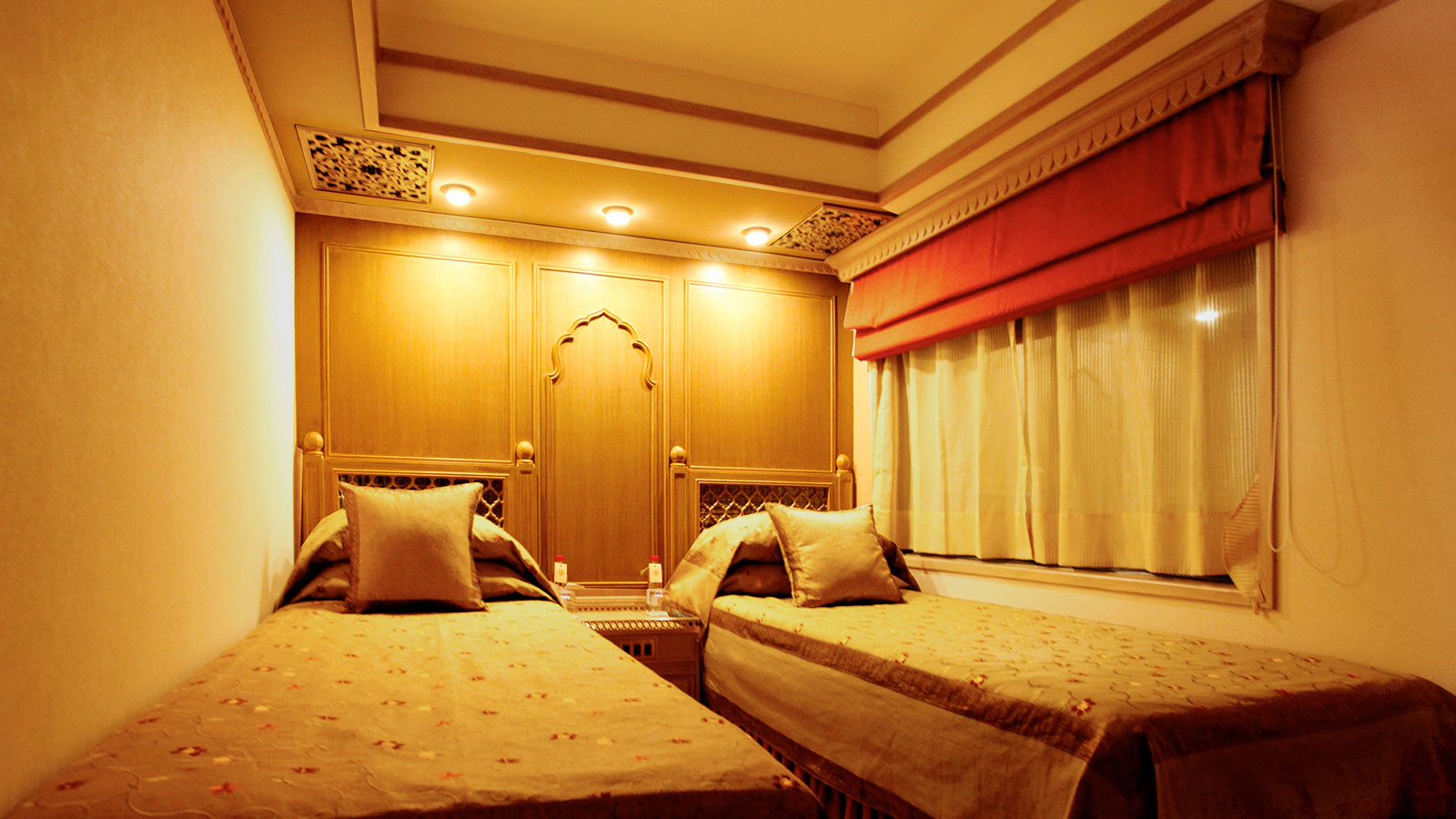
Exterior (left) and interior of Maharajas' Express, a special luxury train

Apart from general trains, Indian railways operates luxury trains such as Maharajas' Express, Deccan Odyssey and other special tourist trains with varied classes. These may include standard coaches, regular coaches with modifications and specially designed coaches with coupes, dedicated cabins and suites. Saloon coaches are also available for chartering which are equipped with a bedroom and kitchen and can be attached to normal trains. Special coaches can also be attached to normal trains in case of special circumstances.

=== Classification ===
==== Coach numbering ====
The coaching stock have unique five or six digit identifiers. Till 2018, the first two digits indicating the year of manufacture and the last three digits indicating the class. In 2018, the numbering system was changed with the first two digits indicating the year of manufacture and the last four digits indicating the sequence number.

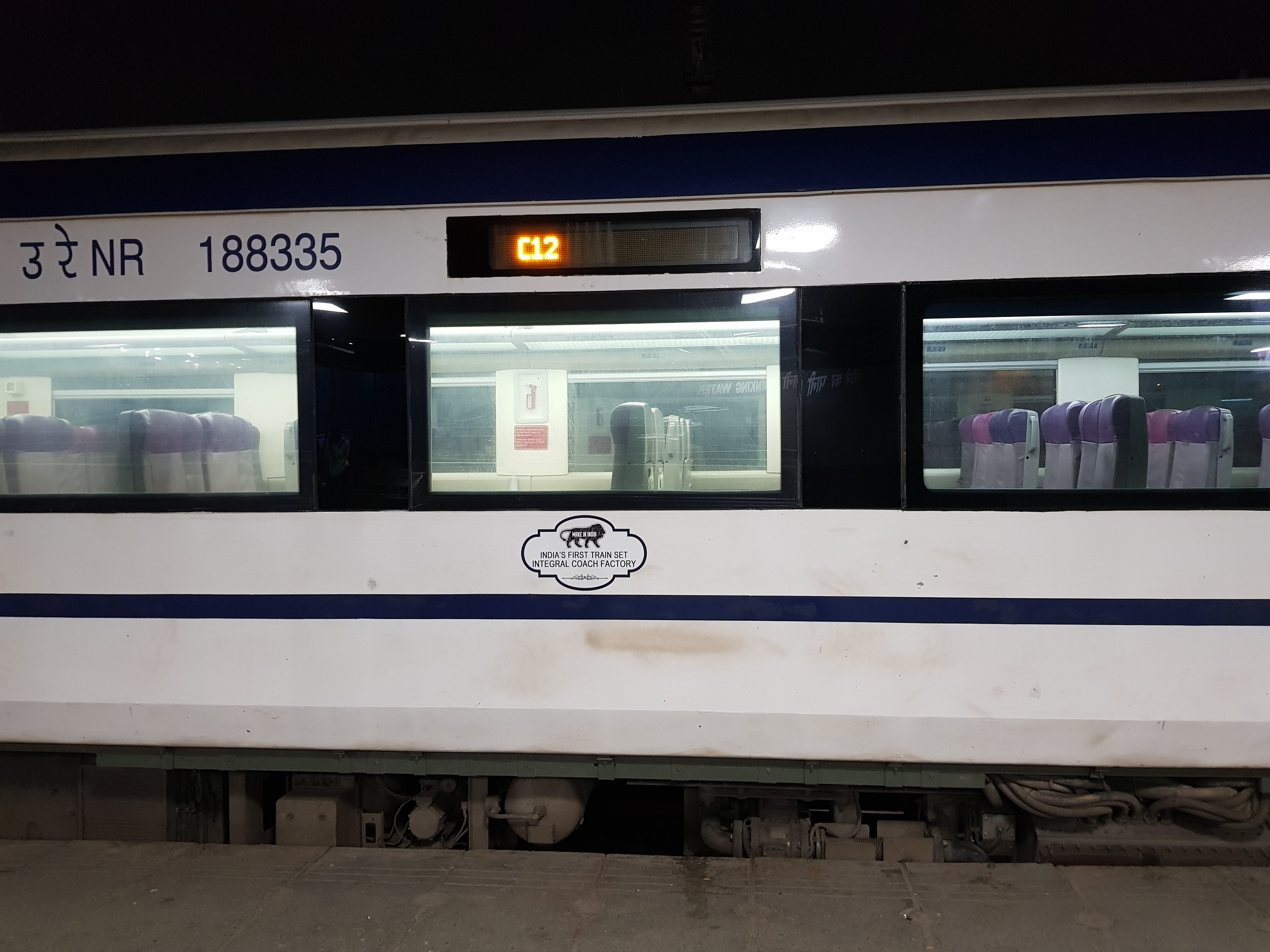
A coaching stock number (188335) and coach code (C12) visible on the side of a coach

Till 2018

Coach numbering (Last 3 digits)
Code	001-025	026-050	051-100	101-150	151-200	201-400	401-600	601-700	701-800	800+
Class	First AC	First AC + AC 2-tier	AC 2-tier	AC 3-tier	AC Chair Car	Sleeper	General	Second sitting	SLR	Others

After 2018

Coach numbering (Last 4 digits)
Code	8001-9999	1001-7999	0001-0999
Class	EMU, DEMU, MEMU	All others	Spare

For the purpose of identification in passenger trains, coaches in a train-set are assigned an alpha-numeric code. The first letter identifies the coach class and the second letter identifies the coach number.

Coach code (First digit)
Code	H	F	EA	E	EV	A	HA	B	C	G	S	D	J	M
Class	First AC	First Class	Executive Anubhuti	Executive	Vistadome	AC 2-tier	First AC cum AC 2-tier	AC 3-tier	AC Chair Car	AC 3-tier Economy (Garib-Rath)	Sleeper	Second sitting (colloquially called 'General')	Chair Car (Garib Rath)	AC 3-tier Economy

==== Seat classification ====
The berths and seats are numbered by an alphanumeric code with the letter(s) identifying the berth/seat type and numbers identifying the position. In standard coaches, the berths and seats are classified as follows:

Berth

- LB = Lower berth
- MB = Middle berth
- UB = Upper berth
- SL = Side lower berth
- SM = Side middle berth
- SU = Side upper berth

Seat

- WS = Window side
- M = Middle
- A = Aisle

Middle and Aisle seats are not mentioned in the train ticket. Only Window Side (WS) seats are mentioned in the ticket.

== Cargo ==
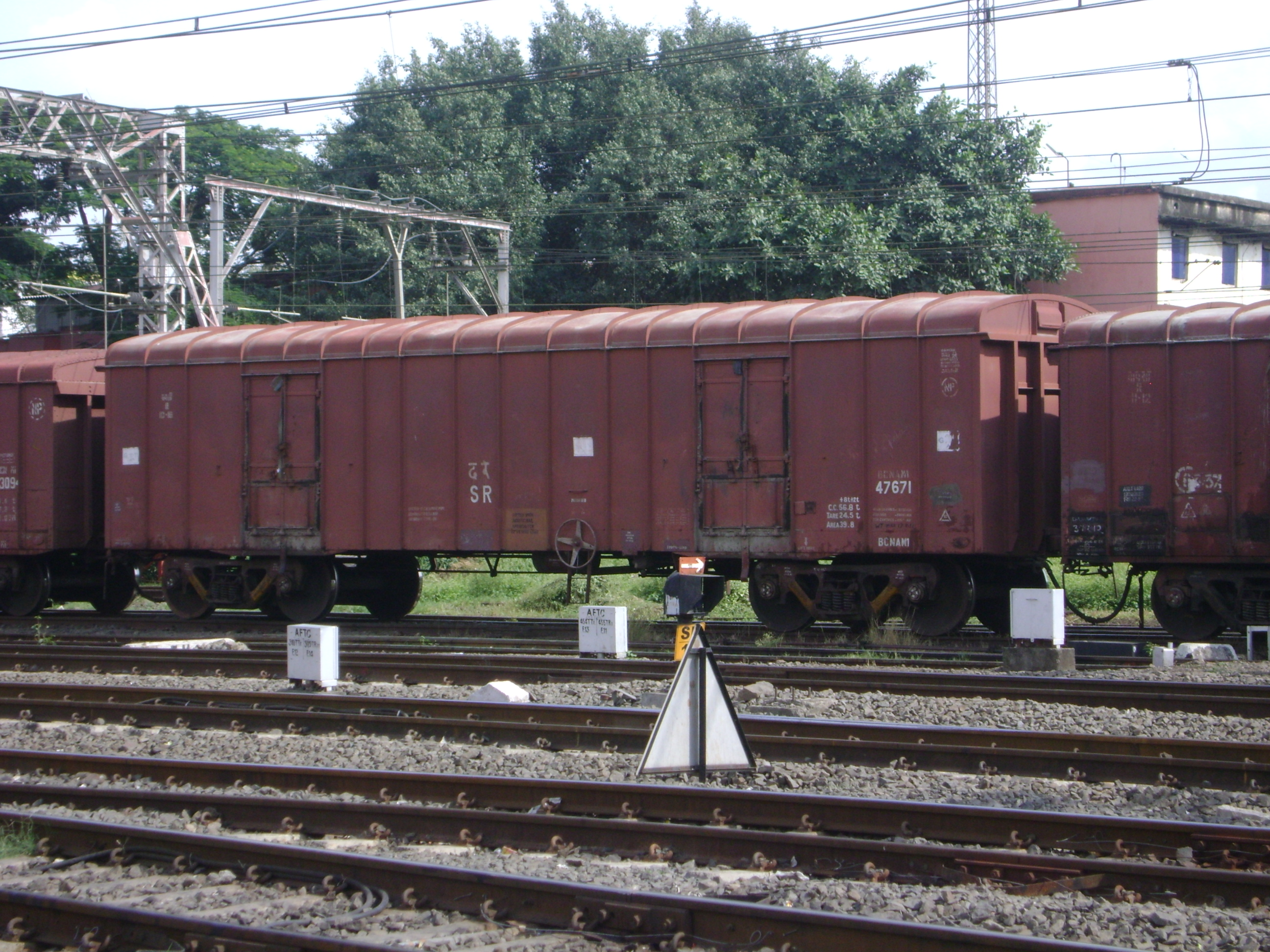
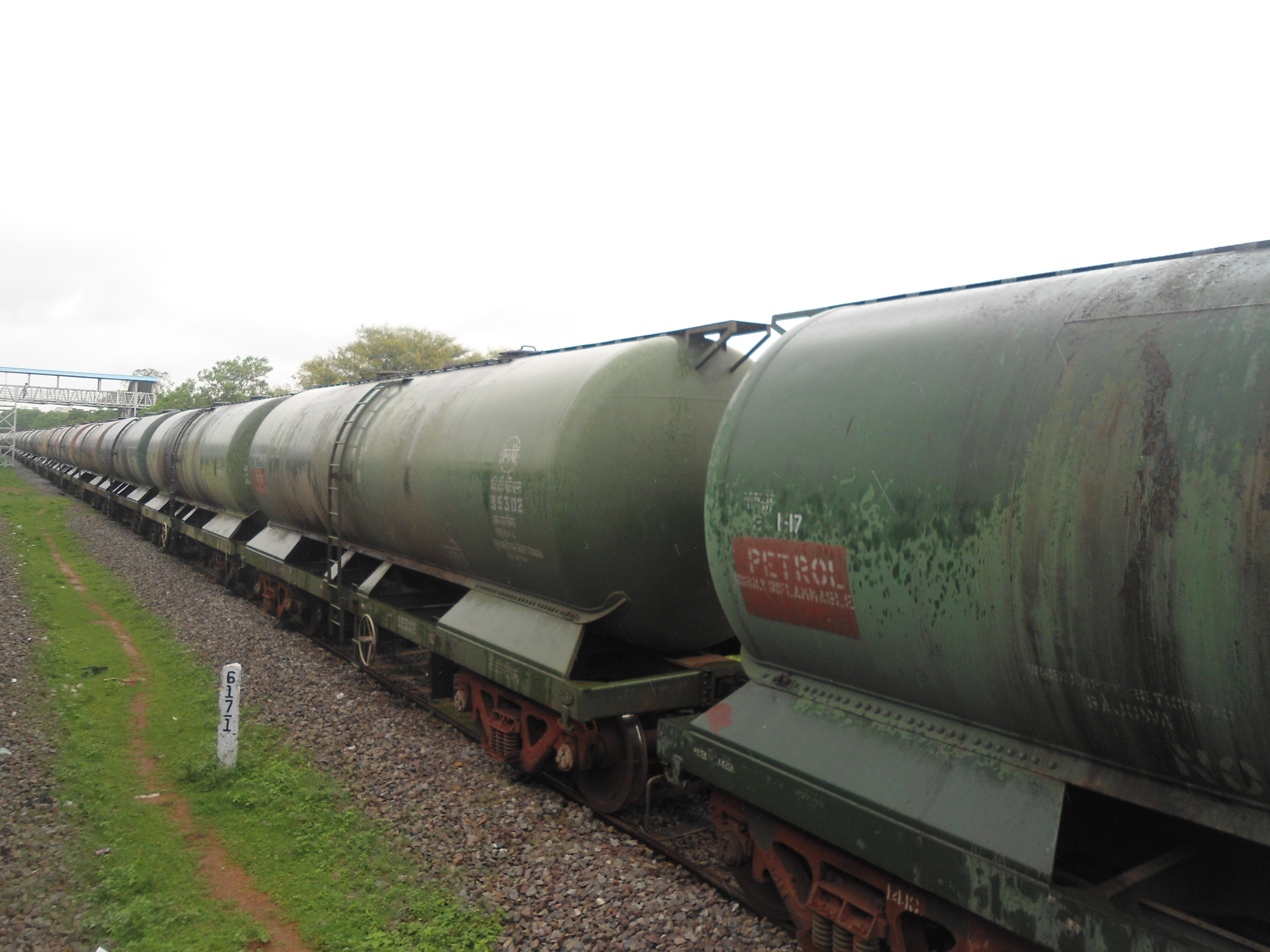
A covered wagon (left) and tanker

Indian Railways operates more than 4000 cargo and goods trains daily. It hauls variety of cargo to cater to various requirements and have specialized rolling stock corresponding to the cargo hauled. There are 243 types of rolling stock used for cargo operations. These include covered wagons, boxcars, flat wagons, flatbeds, open wagons, hoppers, containers, automobile carriers, defense vehicle carriers and tankers. The freight cars can often carry loads from 10 to 80 tonnes per car depending on the configuration.

== Others ==
Apart from standard passenger classes, the Indian Railways has other specialized coach types used for dedicated functions.

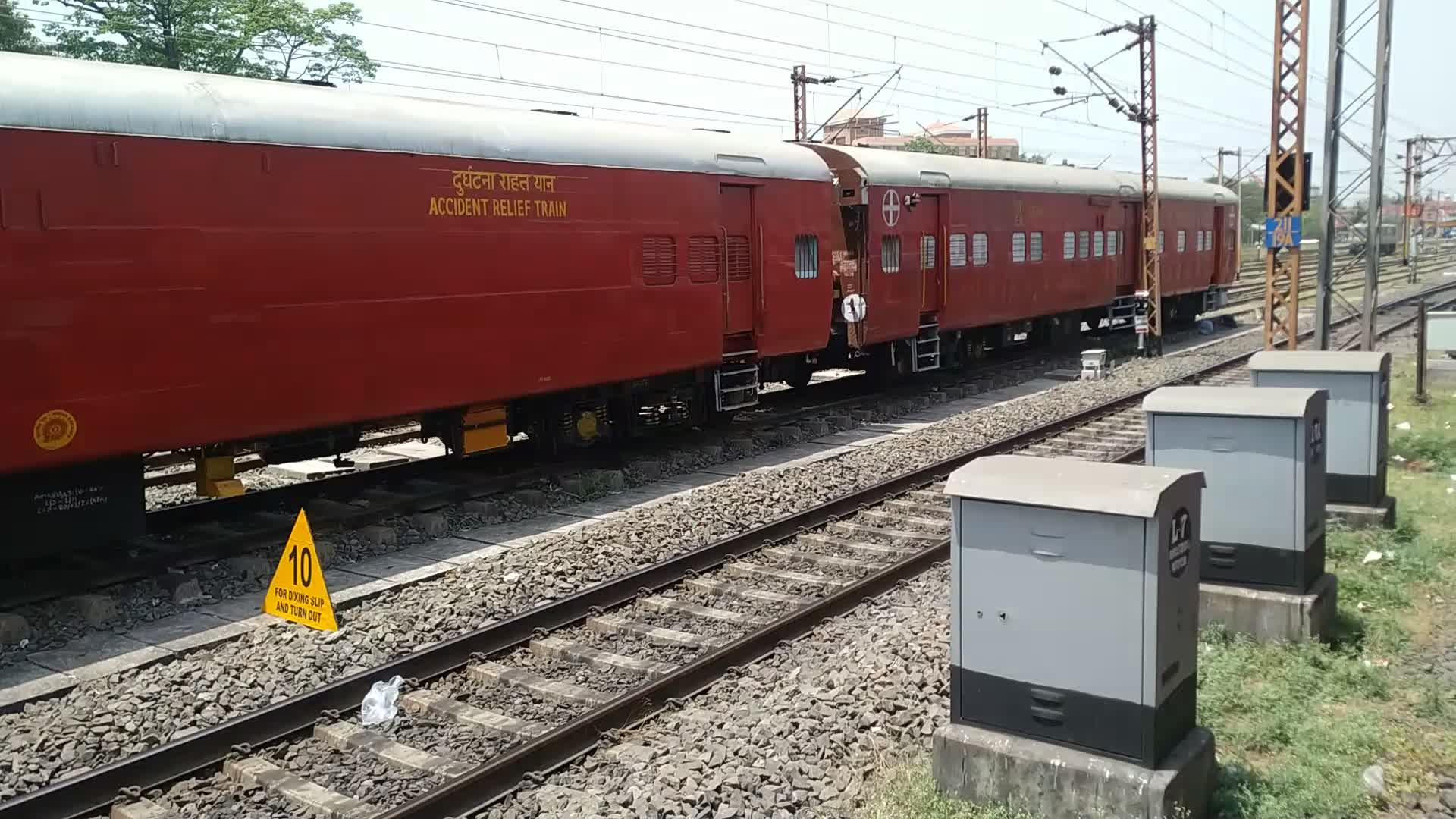
Accident relief medical van

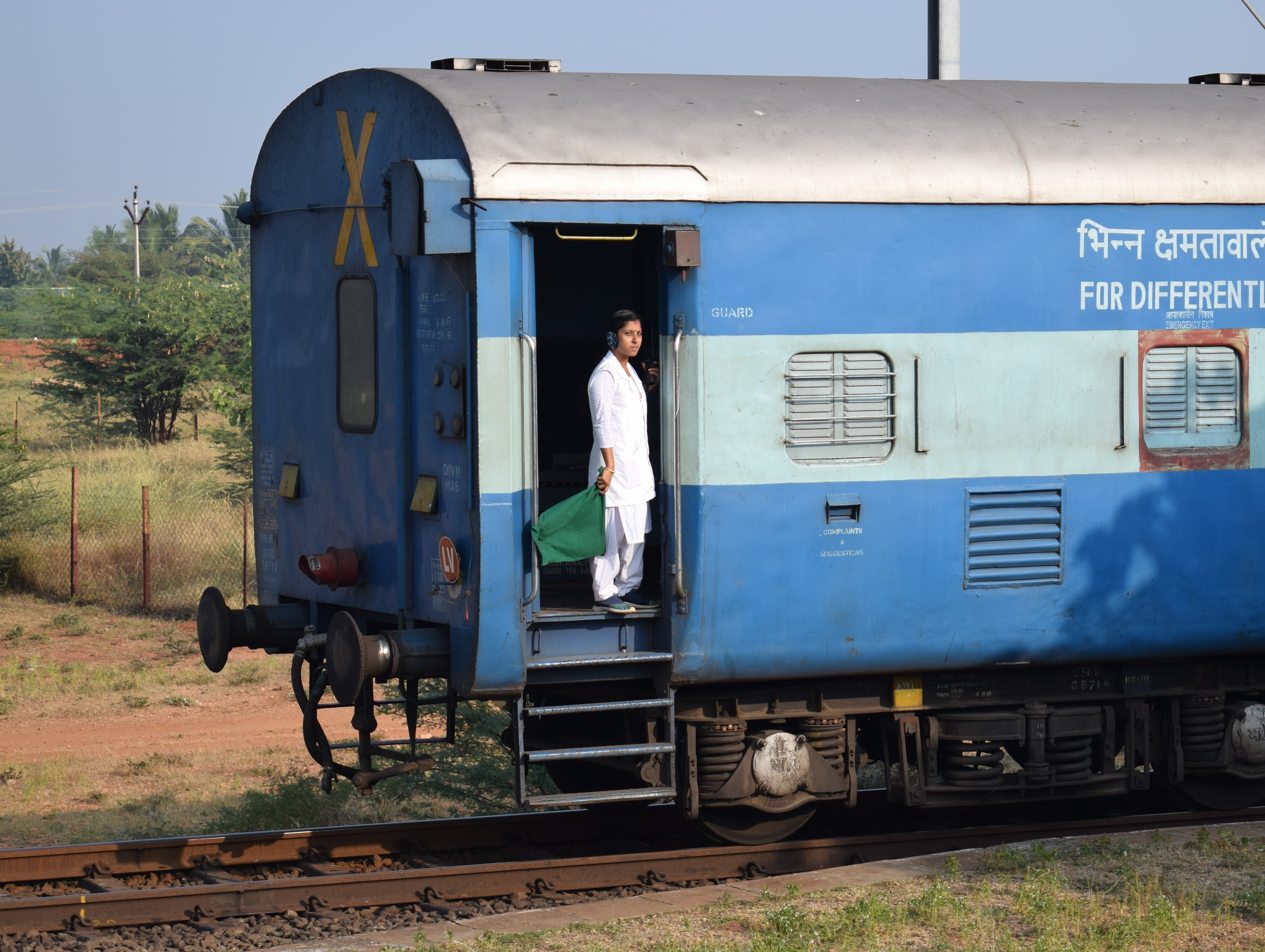
A brake van with guard post

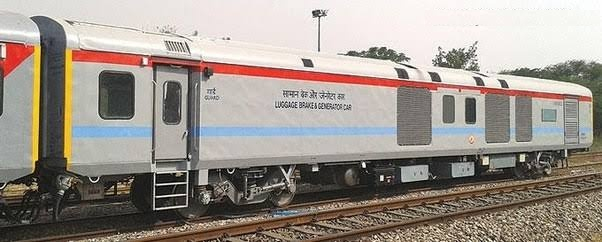
A luggage, brake cum generator car

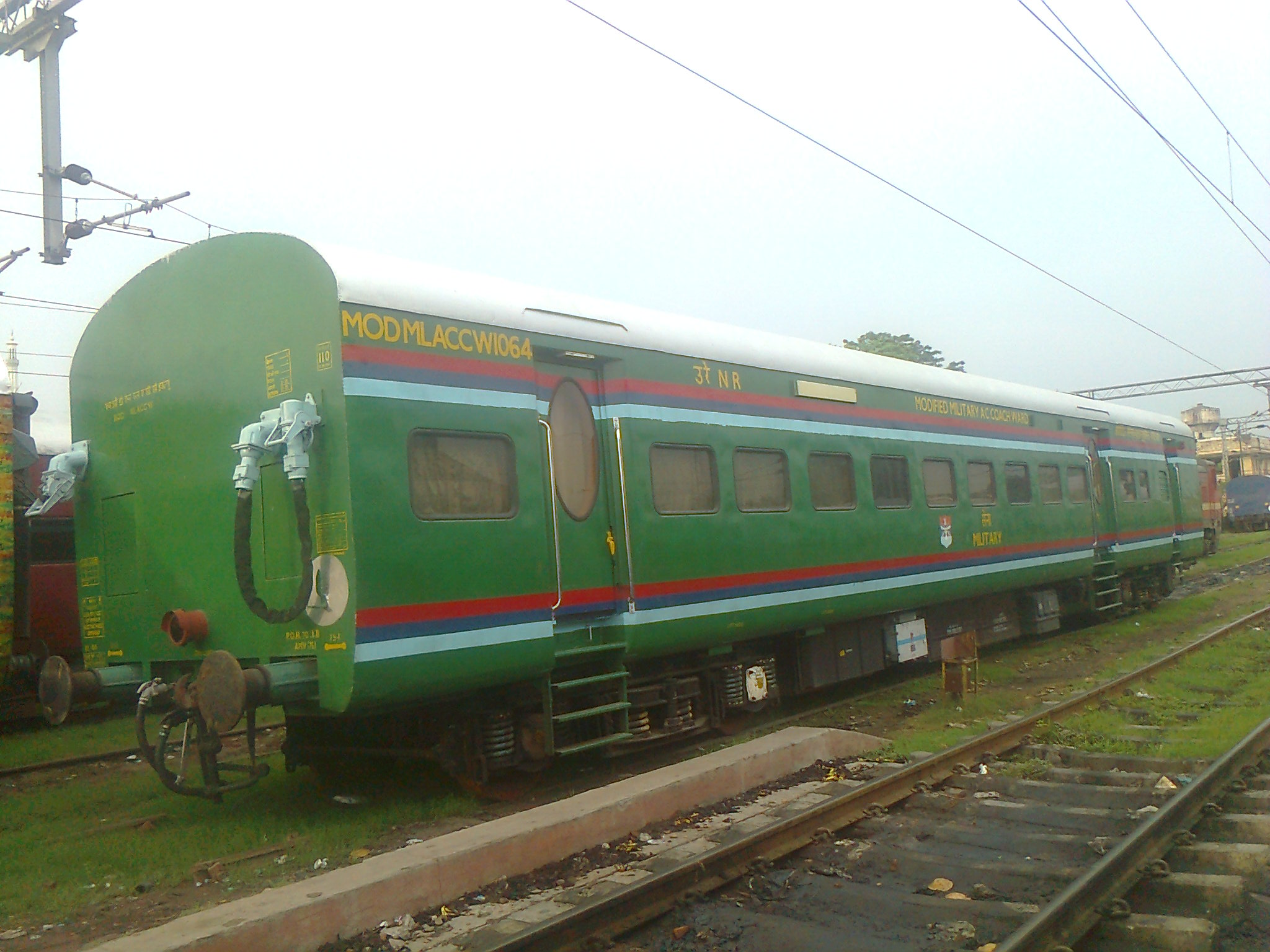
A modified military coach

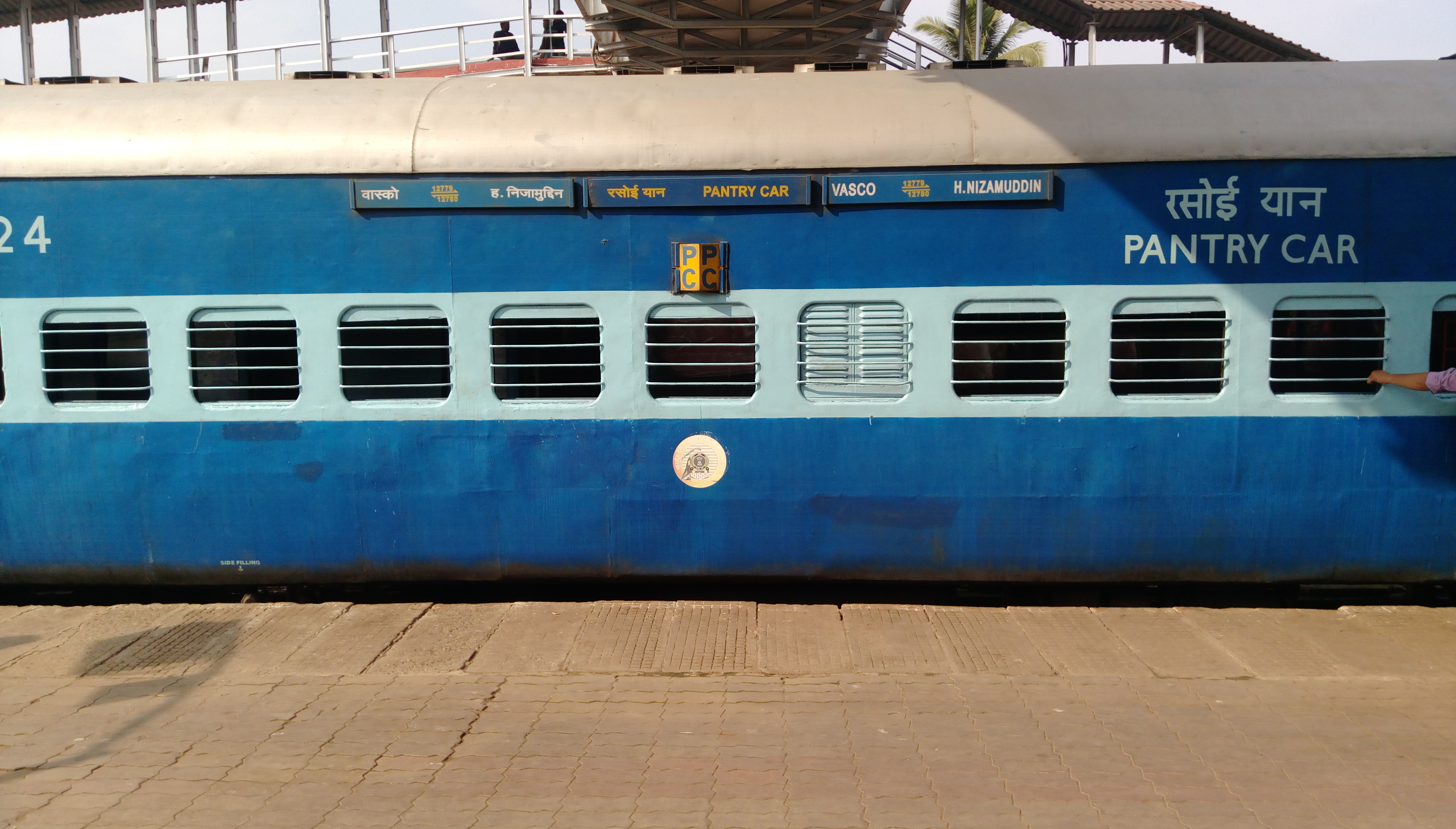
A typical pantry car

Accident relief medical van

These are specially modified coaches with rescue and repair equipment. It may include various medical facilities with multiple beds, an operation theater, recovery and doctor rooms and is self-propelled by diesel motors in most cases. They may carry medical equipment like first aid box, body bags, stretchers, fire extinguishers and other rescue devices such as hydraulic equipment, air bags, slings and ropes, cutting tools, power generators and communication equipment.

Brake van

A Brake van is a wagon equipped with a hand brake which can be applied by the guard. The brake vans are attached to trains as the last coach and consists of an open room or cabin for the guard. The van is equipped with some emergency equipment, lighting box, signalling equipment and monitoring gauges. The brake vans are often combined with small parcel vans or generator cars.

Generator car

Power generator cars contain power generation equipment, often diesel generators which are used to power the equipment on the trains. There are one or two power cars attached to the trains. With electrification of railway lines, Indian railways is equipping train with head on generation (HOG), where power will be drawn from overhead lines and will eliminate the need of separate power generator cars.

Inspection carriage

Railway inspection cars are diesel powered self-propelled vehicles meant for collecting information on railway tracks for analysis and to generate plans accordingly.

Military car

Special cars are made for the purpose of Indian Armed Forces, both passenger and others. A military ward car is used as make-shift hospitals to carry wounded soldiers and are equipped with medical equipment. Crane cars and other cargo wagons are used for specific purposes by the Indian military.

Pantry car

A pantry car is a specialized car which is used for the preparation of meals and snacks to the passengers. The pantry car is equipped with refrigerators, boilers, stoves, warmers, storage compartments, cleaning sinks and other cooking and serving accessories. Some of the trains are equipped with dining facilities as part of it. While pantry cars are separate cars attached with the rake, there are certain coaches which are equipped with mini pantry for serving meals to the passengers.

Parcel van

Parcel vans are used to carry mail, parcels and other cargo. These may be dedicated parcel vans or luggage cars combined with other functions which might be attached to passenger trains. These coaches have foldable luggage racks and collapsible partitions with sliding doors.

=== Newly Modified Goods ===
New Modified Goods (NMG) rakes are specialized rolling stock introduced in 2007 that were made by converting older passenger ICF coaches to carry freight such as automobiles. The conversion process involved stripping away the passenger amenities in the interior, welding the windows and main doors with sheet metal, installation of perforated steel flooring for secure anchoring of cargo, and installation of swing or flap doors at both the ends to facilitate cargo loading. These coaches have a payload capacity of 9.2 to 12 tonnes, and can operate at a maximum speed of 75 km/h (47 mph). In 2021, an upgraded version known as the High-Speed Newly Modified Goods (NMGH) rake, was introduced. These featured wider end-loading doors (2800 mm × 2200 mm), improved adjustable central locking systems, and retrofitted air-brake systems, and were capable of running at speeds up to 110 km/h (68 mph).

== See also ==
- Rail transport in India
