= Pollard Kot =

- Location within Pakistan
- Coordinates: 31.23°N 73.1°E
- Country: Pakistan
- Province: Punjab
- Elevation: 167 m (548 ft)
- Time zone: UTC+5 (PST)

Pollard Kot is a town located in the Punjab province of Pakistan. It is located in Lahore District at 31°23'0N 73°1'0E with an altitude of 167 metres (551 feet) and lies near to the city of Lahore. Neighbouring settlements include Risalewala to the west, Rampur and Jamalpur to the north, Goughabad to the east and Aruri Nawan to the south.
