= Hari Singwala =

- Location within Pakistan
- Coordinates: 31.21°N 73.3°E
- Country: Pakistan
- Province: Punjab
- Elevation: 166 m (545 ft)
- Time zone: UTC+5 (PST)

Hari Singwala is a town in Faisalabad District, in the central Punjab, Pakistan. It is located at 31°21'0N 73°3'0E with an altitude of 166 metres (547 feet) and lies near the city of Lahore. Neighbouring settlements include Sahibnagar to the east and Pollard Kot to the north.
