= Rampur, Lahore =

Rampur
- Location within Pakistan
- Coordinates: 31.24°N 73.1°E
- Country: Pakistan
- Province: Punjab
- Elevation: 169 m (554 ft)
- Time zone: UTC+5 (PST)

Rampur is a town located in the Punjab province of Pakistan. It is located in Lahore District at 31°24'0N 73°0'0E with an altitude of 169 metres (557 feet) and lies near to the city of Lahore. Neighbouring settlements include Narwala to the west, Awan Baluch to the north, Jamalpur to the east and Risalewala to the south.
