= Bismillapur =

- Location within Pakistan
- Coordinates: 31.17°N 73.3°E
- Country: Pakistan
- Province: Punjab
- Elevation: 168 m (551 ft)
- Time zone: UTC+5 (PST)

Bismillapur is a town in Faisalabad District in central Punjab, Pakistan. It is located at 31°17'0N 73°3'0E with an altitude of 168 metres (554 feet) and lies near the city of Lahore. Neighbouring settlements include Bilochwala to the east and Rodasar to the north.
