= Bilochwala =

- Location within Pakistan
- Coordinates: 31.16°N 73.4°E
- Country: Pakistan
- Province: Punjab
- Elevation: 171 m (561 ft)
- Time zone: UTC+5 (PST)

Bilochwala is a town in Faisalabad District in the Punjab province of Pakistan. It is located at 31°17'0N 73°4'0E at an altitude of 171 metres (567 feet). Neighbouring settlements include Bismillapur to the west and Miranpur to the east.
