= Jamalpur Assembly constituency =

Jamalpur Assembly constituency may refer to these state electoral constituencies in India:

- Jamalpur, Bihar Assembly constituency
- Jamalpur-Khadiya Assembly constituency, Gujarat
- Jamalpur, West Bengal Assembly constituency

== See also ==
- Jamalpur (disambiguation)
