= Rodasar =

- Location within Pakistan
- Coordinates: 31.19°N 73.4°E
- Country: Pakistan
- Province: Punjab
- Elevation: 172 m (564 ft)
- Time zone: UTC+5 (PST)

Rodasar is a town located in the Punjab province of Pakistan. It is located in Lahore District at 31°19'0N 73°4'0E with an altitude of 172 metres (567 feet) and lies near to the city of Lahore. Neighbouring settlements include Hari Singwala to the north and Bismillapur to the south.
