= Miranpur, Punjab =

Miranpur
- Location within Pakistan
- Coordinates: 31.17°N 73.7°E
- Country: Pakistan
- Province: Punjab
- Elevation: 172 m (564 ft)
- Time zone: UTC+5 (PST)

Miranpur is a town in the Punjab province of Pakistan. It is located in Lahore District at 31°17'0N 73°7'0E at an altitude of 172 metres (567 feet) and lies near the city of Lahore. Neighbouring settlements include Kot Guraya to the south, Khushipur to the east and Bilochwala to the west.
