= Jamalpur, Jaunpur =

Jamalpur is a village in Jaunpur, Uttar Pradesh, India. It has a population of roughly 5,200 people.

Jamalpur's market is located in Machhlishahr, the Tej Bahadur Seva hospital is located two kilometers away from Jamalpur.

Its community is diverse, containing numerous and disparate demographics and communities, such as Yadav, Singh, Pandit, Pasi, Muslim, Harijan, Mushar, and Kayasth peoples.

Jamalpur is situated 30 km east of the township of Machhalishahar.
