= Jamalpur, Phagwara =

Jamalpur
- Village
- Location in Punjab, India Jamalpur (India)
- Coordinates: 31.527317°N 75.606260°E
- Country: India
- State: Punjab
- District: Kapurthala

Government
  - Type: Panchayati raj (India)
  - Body: Gram panchayat

Population (2011)
  - Total: 1,908
- Sex ratio 995/913♂/♀

Languages
  - Official: Punjabi
  - Other spoken: Hindi
- Time zone: UTC+5:30 (IST)
- PIN: 144401
- Telephone code: 01822
- ISO 3166 code: IN-PB
- Vehicle registration: PB-09
- Website: kapurthala.gov.in

Jamalpur is a village in Phagwara Tehsil in Kapurthala district of Punjab State, India. It is located 46 kilometres (29 mi) from Kapurthala, 6 kilometres (3.7 mi) from Phagwara. The village is administrated by a Sarpanch, who is an elected representative.

== Demography ==
As per census 2011, 673 people were engaged in work activities out of the total population of Jamalpur village, 56 were cultivators (owner or co-owner) while 81 were Agricultural labourer which includes 545 males and 128 females. According to census survey report 2011, 74.29% workers (Employment or Earning more than 6 Months) describe their work as main work and 25.71% workers are involved in Marginal activity providing livelihood for less than 6 months.

According to the report published by Census India in 2011, Hradaspur has 356 houses with the total population of 1,908 persons of which 995 are male and 913 females. Literacy rate of Hradaspur is 75.58%, lower than the state average of 75.84%. The population of children in the age group 0–6 years is 221 which is 11.58% of the total population. Child sex ratio is approximately 873, higher than the state average of 846.

== Population data ==
Particulars	Total	Male	Female
Total No. of Houses	356	-	-
Population	1,908	995	913
Child (0-6)	221	118	103
Schedule Caste	1,746	915	831
Schedule Tribe	0	0	0
Literacy	75.58 %	80.50 %	70.25 %
Total Workers	673	545	128
Main Worker	500	0	0
Marginal Worker	173	113	60

== Caste ==
The village has schedule caste (SC) constitutes 91.51% of total population of the village and it doesn't have any Schedule Tribe (ST) population.
