= Jamalpur, Khagaria =

Village in Bihar, India

Jamalpur
- Village
- Location within Bihar Location within India
- Coordinates: 25°26′29″N 86°39′22″E
- Country: India
- State: Bihar
- District: Khagaria
- Block: Gogri

Government
  - Type: Sarpanch

Area
  - Total: 13.84 km^{2} (5.34 sq mi)
- Elevation: 42 m (138 ft)

Population (2011)
  - Total: 30,972
  - Density: 2,238/km^{2} (5,796/sq mi)

Languages
  - Local: Angika, Hindi
- Time zone: UTC+5:30 (IST)
- PIN: 851203
- STD code: 06245
- Vehicle registration: BR-34

Jamalpur is a village in Khagaria district of Bihar, India. It is situated on the southeast of the district headquarter Khagaria, along the National Highway 31. As of the year 2011, it had a population of 30,972.

== Geography ==
Jamalpur is located to the south of Kosi River and to the north of the Ganges. It covers an area of 1384 hectares.

== Demographics ==
According to 2011 census of India, there were a total of 5,985 households within Jamalpur. Among the 30,972 residents, 16,551 were males and 14,431 were females. The working population constituted 29.29% of the overall population. The literacy rate was 47.53%, with 7,795 of the male residents and 8,456 of the female residents being literate.
