= Jamalpur (Mirzapur district) =

Village in Uttar Pradesh, India

Jamalpur Mirzapur is a village in Mirzapur district, Uttar Pradesh, India.

The total population of Jamalpur in the 2001 census was 4229.
