= Jamalpur, Pakistan =

Jamalpur
- Location within Pakistan
- Coordinates: 29°39′50″N 70°25′20″E
- Country: Pakistan
- Province: Punjab
- Time zone: UTC+5 (PST)

Jamalpur (Urdu: جمال پور) is a Union Council of Hasilpur Tehsil, Bahawalpur District, Punjab, Pakistan. The Sutlej River flows through it. The main crops grown here are cotton, wheat and sugarcane and animal rearing is also an important part of the rural economy.
