= Kalishom =

Kalishom or Kalisham or Kelishom (Persian: كليشم) may refer to:

- Kalisham, Gilan
- Kalishom, Mazandaran
- Kalisham Rural District, in Gilan Province
