= Jirandeh (disambiguation) =

Jirandeh is a city in Gilan Province, Iran.

Jirandeh (Persian: جيرنده) may refer to:

- Jirandeh, Qazvin
- Jirandeh Rural District, in Gilan Province, Iran
