= Footpaths of Gibraltar =

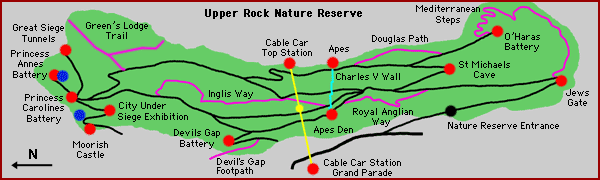
Overview map of the Upper Rock Nature Reserve

The footpaths of Gibraltar provide access to key areas of the Upper Rock Nature Reserve, a refuge for hundreds of species of flora and fauna which in some cases are found nowhere else in Europe. The reserve occupies the upper part of the Rock of Gibraltar, a long and narrow mountain that rises to a maximum height of 424 metres (1,391 ft) above sea level, and constitutes around 40 per cent of Gibraltar's total land area. The unusual geology of the Rock of Gibraltar – a limestone peak adjoining a sandstone hinterland – provides a habitat for plants and animals, such as the Gibraltar candytuft and Barbary partridge, which are found nowhere else in mainland Europe. For many years, the Upper Rock was reserved exclusively for military use; it was fenced off for military purposes, but was decommissioned and converted into a nature reserve in 1993.

The footpaths link many of the fortifications of Gibraltar. They were constructed from the 18th century onwards using chisels, hammers and rods to dig through the solid rock, to permit cannon, soldiers and supplies to be moved from ground level to gun positions and observation points established in numerous places on the Upper Rock. Most of these supply routes were later widened to permit vehicular traffic. Many of the roads on the Upper Rock have steel rings embedded in the rock alongside the carriageway, which were used as safety brakes for heavy loads such as cannon being pulled up the slope. Some routes were retained as footpaths to enable troop movements to be concealed behind the surrounding shrubbery, and to provide alternative routes to key points if a road was congested with a heavy load. Several of the paths can be combined into a strenuous circuit of around 10 kilometres (6.2 mi) that takes about four hours to complete, providing broad views of the Gibraltar peninsula, the Strait of Gibraltar, Spain and the coast of Morocco.

== Devil's Gap Footpath ==
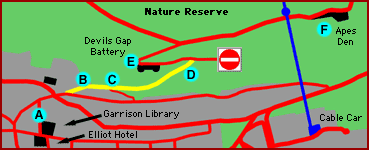
Map of Devil's Gap Footpath

Devil's Gap Footpath links Gibraltar's Upper Town to Devil's Gap Battery, one of the oldest artillery batteries on the peninsula. It offers views over the city, Gibraltar Harbour and Bay of Gibraltar. It takes its name from the rocky outcrop at the top of the path on which the battery stands, which was called Punta del Diablo ("Devil's Point") by the Spanish. At 130 metres (430 ft) above sea level, the outcrop provided a strategic location on the escarpment above the town and therefore commanded a wide range over the Bay of Gibraltar, making it hard for any enemy movements to go unnoticed.

Although difficult to say for sure, it is thought that the path has been in existence since at least the early 18th century but definitely since the Great Siege of Gibraltar (1779–83). Older maps of the area show paths leading from the town to the Upper Rock but none seem to follow the current route. Luis Bravo de Acuña's 1627 "Plan of Gibraltar" shows that the eastern limits of the town were well below the current level. The natural route from the town to the Upper Rock at the time would have been via Charles V Wall.

The path commences at the eastern boundary of the Upper Town at the junction of Devil's Gap Road with Baca's Passage. It proceeds in a mostly southerly direction before reaching a flight of steps which link it to Green Lane, the road leading to Devil's Gap Battery. Although it was previously overgrown and in a poor condition, it was renovated in 2013 as part of the Upper Rock Management Plan to make it more accessible, in a similar way to the refurbishment previously carried out at Mediterranean Steps. As part of the refurbishment works, the path was widened by pruning overgrown trees and shrubs and the drains were unclogged to prevent the path from puddling after rains. Information display panels carrying historical information about the path and on the wildlife that can be found there, together with a picnic table and waste bins designed to keep out Gibraltar's Barbary macaques were also added along the path. The Gibraltar Ornithological and Natural History Society and the Gibraltar Heritage Trust oversaw it to ensure the work was carried out in a sensitive manner.

== Douglas Path ==
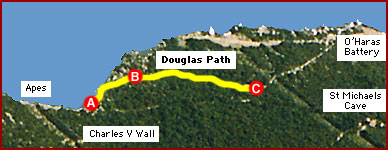
Map of Douglas' Path

Douglas Path is a path that connects a series of military installations at the top of the Rock of Gibraltar. It leads from the top of Charles V Wall to Mount Misery, one of the peaks of the Rock, before proceeding southwards to end at Douglas Cave. The first section of the path climbs a steep set of steps before running along a knife-edge ridge. It has views over both sides of the Rock of Gibraltar. The sheer east face of the Rock and the Great Gibraltar Sand Dune, which covers a large part of the eastern slope, can readily be seen. The vista provides sweeping views over the Bay of Gibraltar to the west and the Mediterranean Sea to the east. The path was cut by convict labour to facilitate troop movements on the Upper Rock.

Shortly after setting off from the north end of the path, an old circular stone building is reached. Its construction has traditionally been attributed to the period of the Moorish occupation of Gibraltar (between 711 and 1462). In fact, it is much more likely to be an early British structure which appears to have been built using stone recycled from an earlier building. It is nonetheless one of the oldest surviving structures at the top of the Rock. A short distance past the old observation post is a World War II structure, the Fortress Commander's Command Post. The path then descends to meet O'Hara's Road, which leads to O'Hara's Battery.

== Inglis Way ==
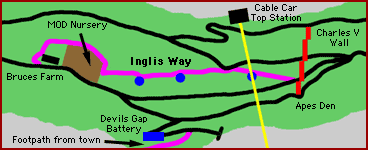
Map of Inglis Way

Inglis Way is a footpath with a length of around 1,200 metres (3,900 ft) that traverses the middle section of the Upper Rock, linking various disused observation posts and emplacements. The origins of its name are uncertain; it may have been named after a person named Inglis, or it may have derived from an old Spanish name, el Camino del ingles, "the Englishman's Path". It is the second longest path in the nature reserve after the Mediterranean Steps.

The path, which takes about two hours to walk, starts at Queen's Gate in the Charles V Wall – one of Gibraltar's oldest surviving fortifications, constructed in 1540. After proceeding through a breach in the Moorish Wall, the main section of the path passes under the cables of the Gibraltar Cable Car before passing a series of abandoned World War II observation posts and searchlight emplacements. A section of the path that proceeds through a firebreak at Bruce's Farm has views over the northern end of Gibraltar and across the Bay towards Algeciras.

The area of the Rock through which the path passes is one of the richest in Gibraltar for flora and fauna. The start of the path is relatively sparsely vegetated and includes species such as White Asparagus, Common Asphodel, Germander and Esparto Grass. Its later sections proceed through dense vegetation that is typical of Mediterranean maquis shrubland – a widespread biome in southern Europe that consists of densely growing evergreen shrubs adapted to resist droughts. The trees along the path are predominantly olives. These have all grown since the Great Siege of Gibraltar (1779–83) when the Upper Rock's original woodland was felled by the British garrison to serve as fuel. It is thought that the present arboreal flora of Gibraltar is the result of seeds being brought onto the Rock by birds. The maquis flora includes dense knots of creepers such as smilax, December clematis, pipe fine and black bryony, while ferns such as southern polypody and the rusty-back fern exploit the shade provided by the canopy. Many species of aromatic herbs and flowers also grow alongside the path, including purple Jerusalem sage and bee orchids. The fauna includes various species of birds that are adapted to life in the maquis, including the Sardinian warbler, wren and woodcock. Barbary partridges can be seen in the more open areas adjoining the path. Europe's largest lizard, the ocellated lizard, also lives in the vicinity, along with Iberian wall lizard, Algerian sand racer and Moorish gecko.

Views of Gibraltar's footpaths
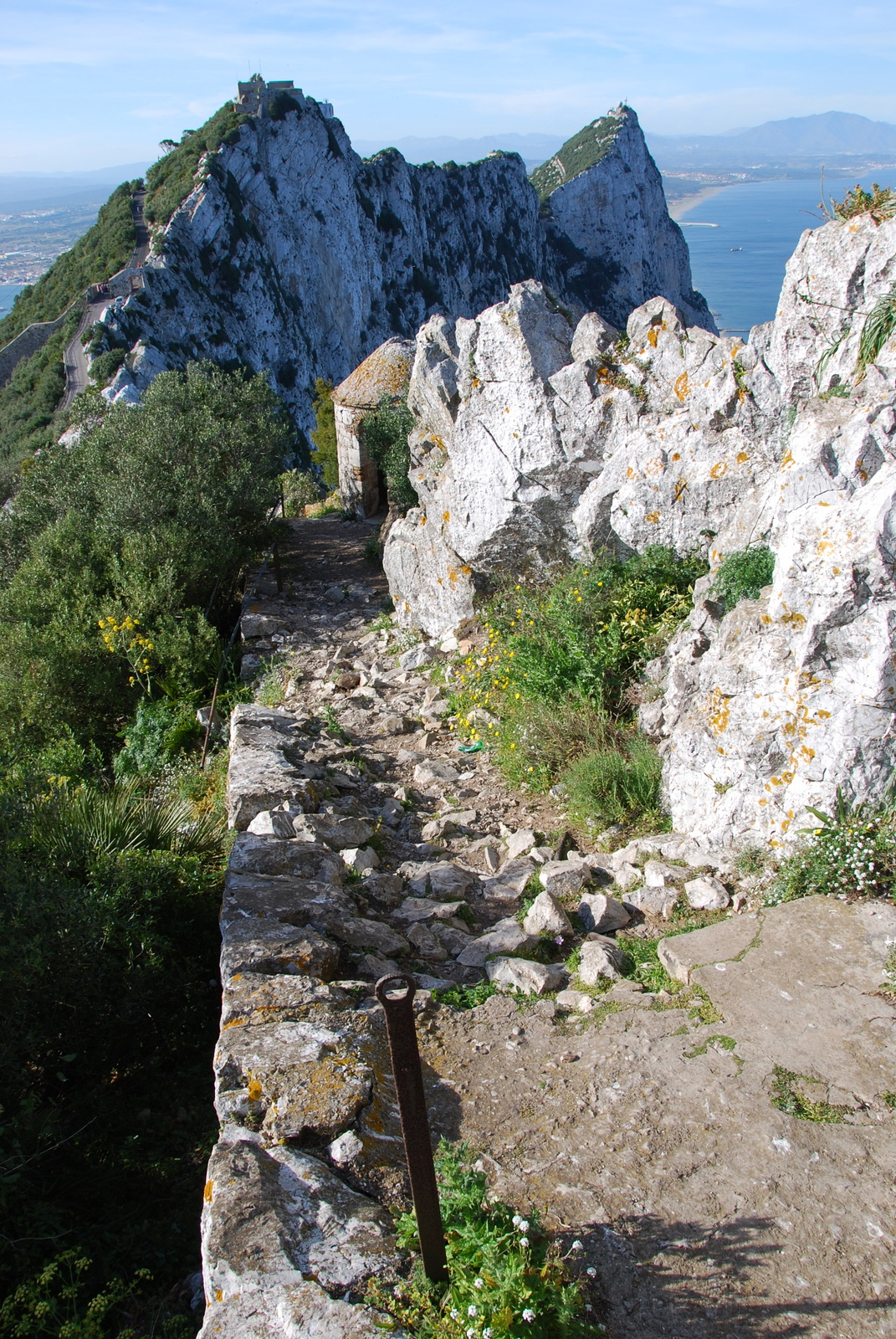
Douglas Path

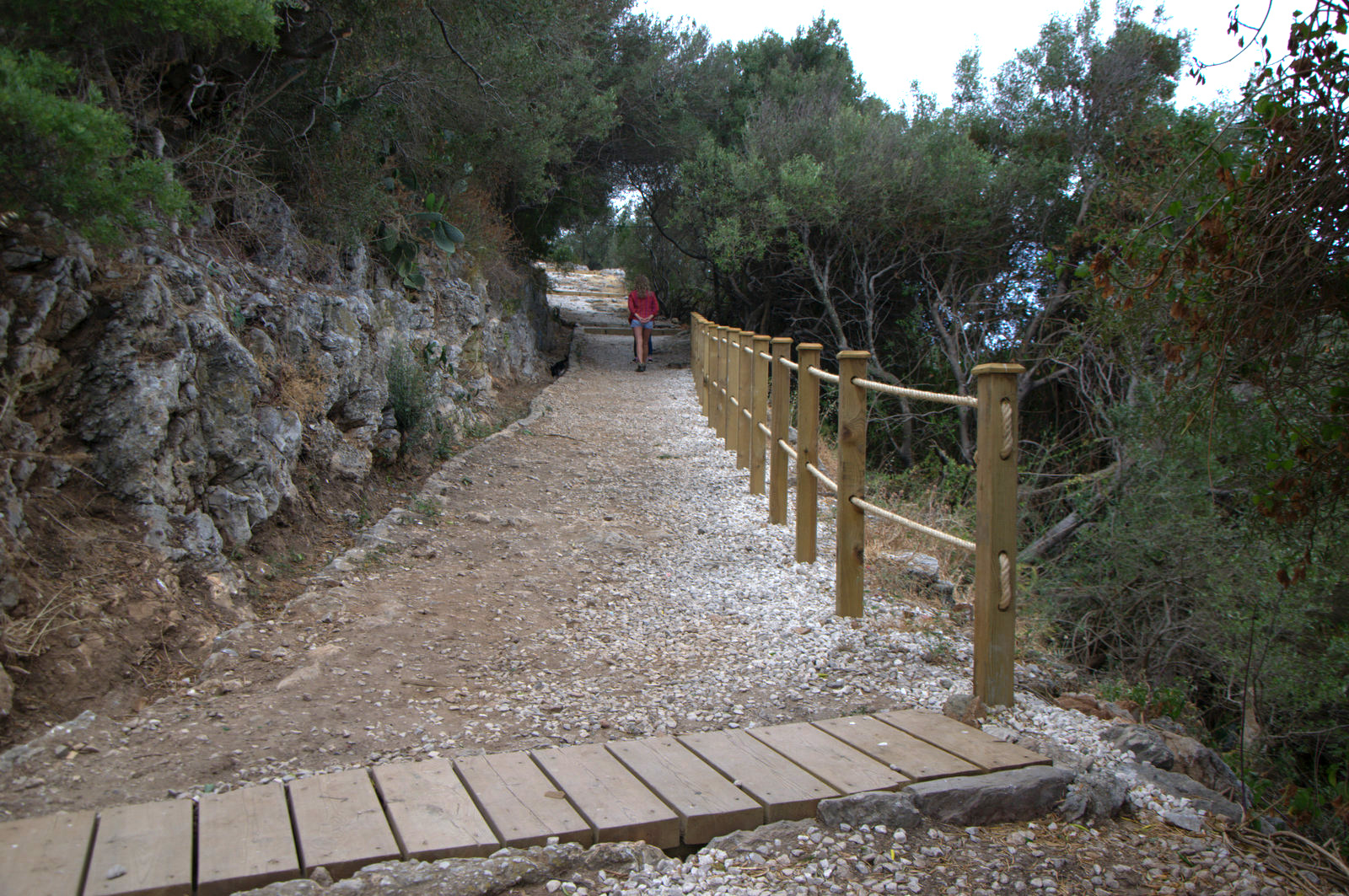
Devil's Gap Footpath

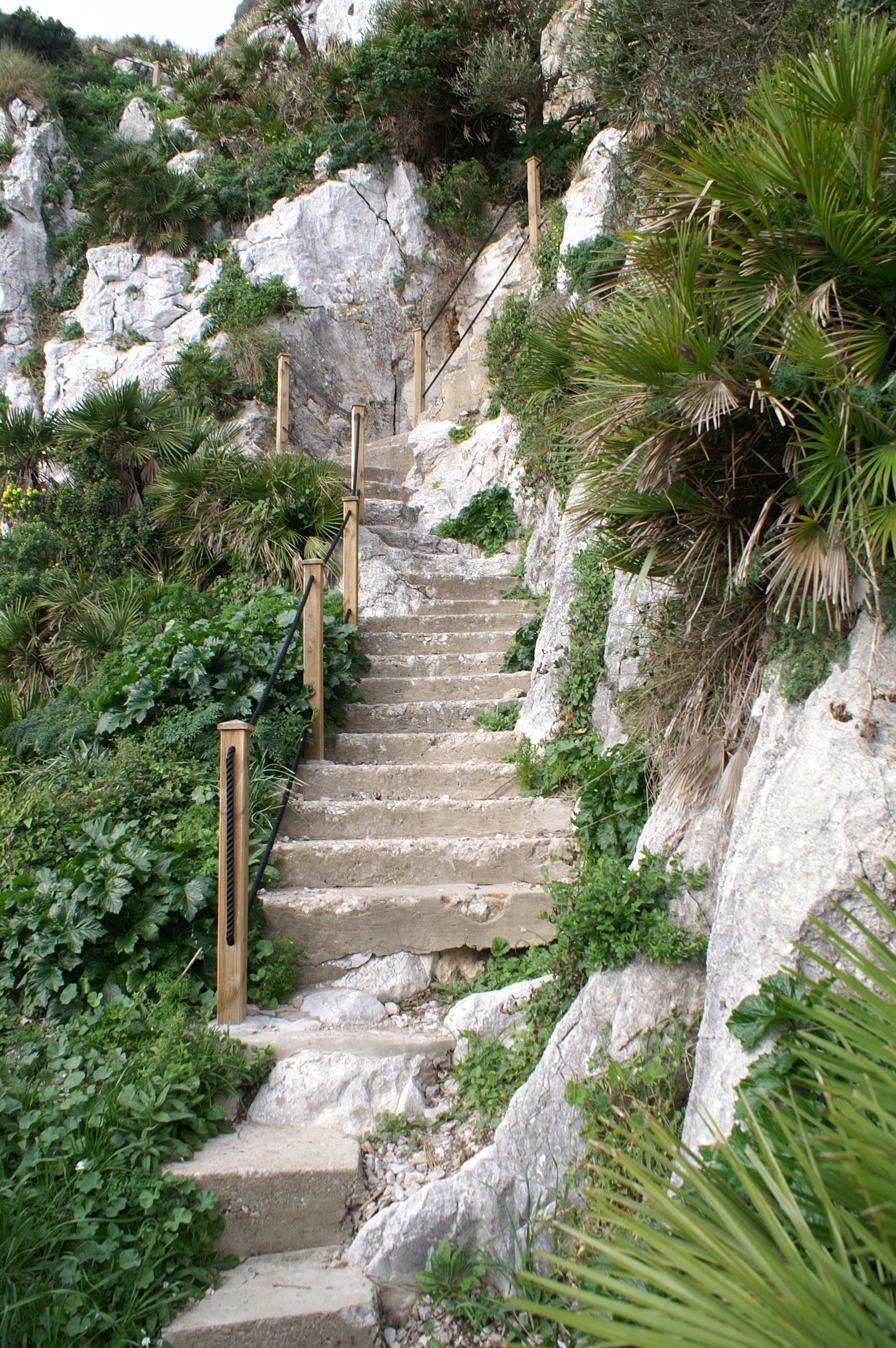
Mediterranean Steps

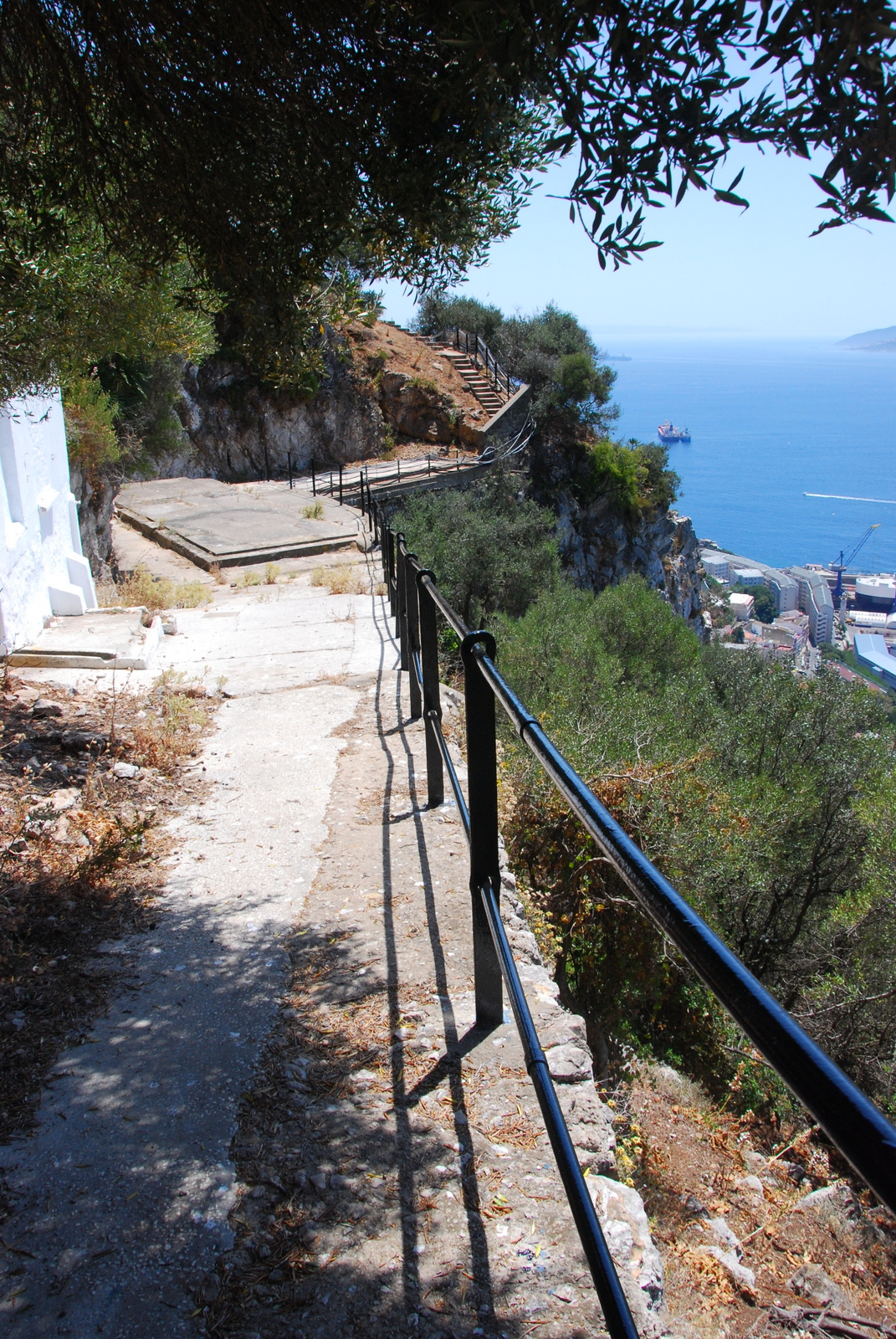
Royal Anglian Way

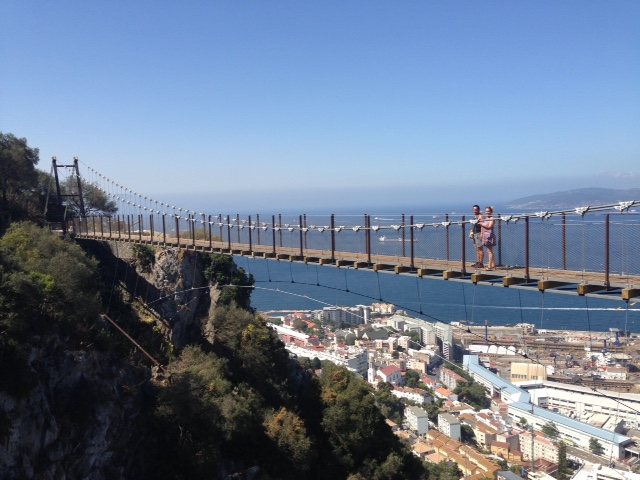
Windsor Bridge

== Mediterranean Steps ==
The Mediterranean Steps are one of Gibraltar's more strenuous paths, descending from O'Hara's Battery near the Rock's summit to Jews' Gate at the southern foot of the Rock. They consist of a rock-cut staircase "which winds and bends and twists around precipice after precipice, and from point to point, with the Rock above and the blue expanse of the Mediterranean below." They were constructed as part of the military communications system built by the British to allow access to their various installations at the southern end of the Rock.

== Royal Anglian Way ==
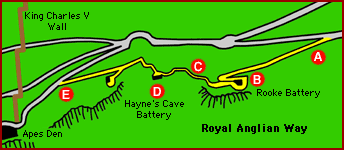
Map of Royal Anglian Way. A – eastern entry/exit point; B – Rooke Battery; C – military buildings; D – Hayne's Cave Battery; E – western entry/exit point

Royal Anglian Way is a path that begins near Apes' Den, where there is a feeding station for the Barbary macaques in Gibraltar, and runs a distance of 600 metres (2,000 ft) to a point near St. Michael's Cave. The feeding of the "apes" takes place twice a day in the early morning and late evening. They live in a number of troops with defined territories on the Rock; the Anglian Way Macaque Group has its feeding area at Apes' Den and the entirety of the path is within the troop's territory. The macaques can be observed from the path dwelling in their natural habitat, away from the tourists who gather at Apes' Den to see the feedings.

Much of the path was already in existence in the early 20th century to provide access to a number of gun batteries and other military installations. It takes its name from the Royal Anglian Regiment of the British Army, whose 2nd Battalion refurbished the path in 1968–69 and still maintains it with help from the Gibraltar Regiment. From its western starting point at Old Queen's Road, at a height of 247 metres (810 ft) above sea level, Royal Anglian Way runs along the western slope of the Rock past a number of abandoned military installations. It first passes Hayne's Cave Battery, a gun position established in 1797. One of the artillery pieces installed there in the 20th century is still present. Several former military support buildings are located further along the path, including kitchens with elongated ceramic chimneys. A little further along is Rooke Battery, built in 1907 and last used during World War II to mount a searchlight for illuminating the bay and to house the Fire Command Headquarters. The remains of the searchlight mounting can still be seen.

The area around the path has been heavily shaped by human activity, leading to its colonisation by nitrophilous plants which benefit from nitrate-rich environments created by human interference. Flora and fauna that can be seen along the path include esparto grass, wild gladiolus, toothed lavender, rough bugloss and felty and shrubby germander, which grow in the area. Barbary partridge, northern raven and common kestrels nest near the path. A less welcome presence is that of a number of feral goats which have caused serious damage to the vegetation, although eradication efforts are being pursued.

On 21 June 2016 Chief Minister Fabian Picardo opened the Windsor Suspension Bridge along the Royal Anglian Way. The 71-meter long bridge connects an abandoned battery with the Hayne's Cave Battery crossing a 50-meter deep ravine, thus avoiding having to climb down into the gorge and back out again.
