= Aineh Deh =

Village in Gilan province, Iran

Aineh Deh Persian: آيينه ده
- Village
- Location within Iran
- Coordinates: 36°42′38″N 49°48′18″E
- Country: Iran
- Province: Gilan
- County: Rudbar
- District: Amarlu
- Rural District: Jirandeh

Population (2016)
  - Total: 155
- Time zone: UTC+3:30 (IRST)

Aineh Deh (Persian: آيينه ده) (Note: Also romanized as Ā’īneh Deh and Āyneh Deh; also known as ‘Ainadeh and Aynadei) is a village in Jirandeh Rural District of Amarlu District in Rudbar County, Gilan province, Iran.

The village's location was changed after destruction and during the 1990 Manjil–Rudbar earthquake. It is located northeast of Jirandeh city. The main livelihoods of inhabitants of the village are farming and mining, and fruit gardens can also be found.

== Demographics ==
=== Population ===
At the time of the 2006 National Census, the village's population was 150 in 54 households. The following census in 2011 counted 152 people in 66 households. The 2016 census measured the population of the village as 155 people in 65 households.
