= Dogasar =

Village in Gilan province, Iran

Dogasar Persian: دگاسر
- Village
- Location within Iran
- Coordinates: 36°37′19″N 49°53′22″E
- Country: Iran
- Province: Gilan
- County: Rudbar
- District: Amarlu
- Rural District: Kalisham

Population (2016)
  - Total: 44
- Time zone: UTC+3:30 (IRST)

Dogasar (Persian: دگاسر) (Note: Also romanized as Dogāsar) is a village in Kalisham Rural District of Amarlu District in Rudbar County, Gilan province, Iran.

== Demographics ==
=== Population ===
At the time of the 2006 National Census, the village's population was 34 in nine households. The following census in 2011 counted 21 people in nine households. The 2016 census measured the population of the village as 44 people in 12 households.
