= Karamak-e Bala =

Karamak-e Bala کرماک بالا
- Village
- Location within Iran
- Coordinates: 36°40′12″N 49°36′34″E
- Country: Iran
- Province: Gilan
- County: Rudbar
- Bakhsh: Amarlu
- Rural District: Jirandeh

Population (2016)
  - Total: 41
- Time zone: UTC+3:30 (IRST)

Karamak-e Bala (Persian: کرماک بالا, also Romanized as Karamāk-e Bālā; also known as Bālā Karamāk) is a village in Jirandeh Rural District, Amarlu District, Rudbar County, Gilan Province, Iran. At the 2016 census, its population was 41, in 14 families. Up from 36 in 2006.
