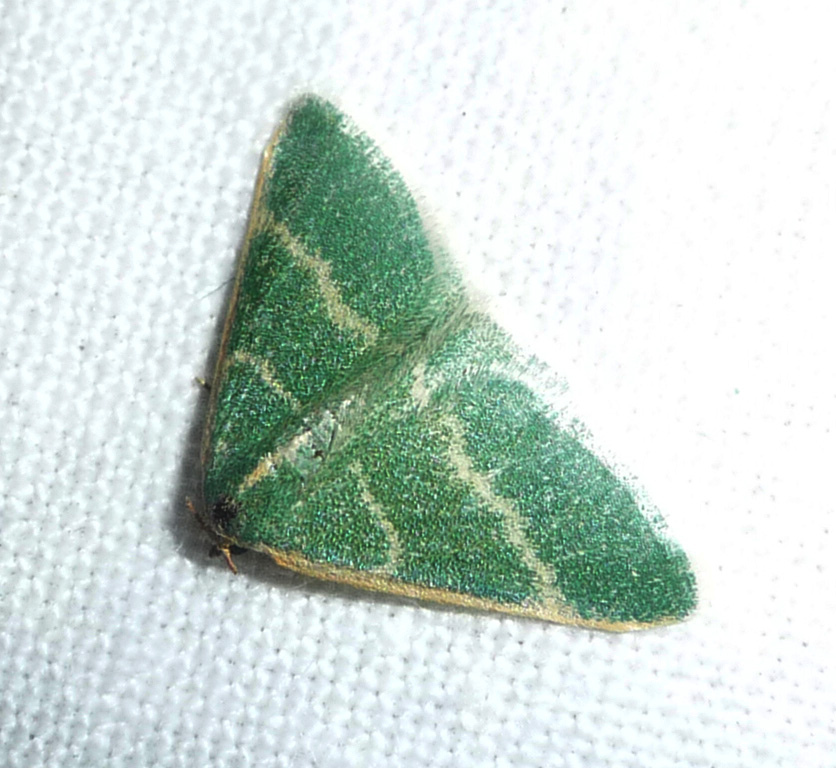

Scientific classification
- Kingdom: Animalia
- Phylum: Arthropoda
- Clade: Pancrustacea
- Class: Insecta
- Order: Lepidoptera
- Family: Geometridae
- Genus: Microloxia
- Species: M. herbaria

Binomial name
- Microloxia herbaria Hübner, 1808

Synonyms
- Geometra herbaria Hübner, [1813]; Geometra graminaria Zeller, 1849; Nemoria bruandaria Millière, 1860; Nemoria monotona (Reisser, 1926)

= Microloxia herbaria =

Species of moth

Microloxia herbaria, the herb emerald, is a moth of the family Geometridae. The species was first described by Jacob Hübner in 1808. It is a widespread species that can be found along the Mediterranean region, southern Europe, central Asia towards southern Asia including India, Pakistan and Sri Lanka and to the Russian Far East.

== Biology ==
It is a green moth with white irrorations (speckles). Host plants of the caterpillar include Artemisia, Thymus capitatus, Mentha suaveolens, Vernonia centaureoides, Helichrysum stoechas and Teucrium polium.

== Subspecies ==
Three subspecies are recognized.

- Microloxia herbaria advolata Eversmann, 1837
- Microloxia herbaria indecretata Walker, 1863
- Microloxia herbaria ruficornis Warren, 1897
