= Kharehpu =

Village in Gilan province, Iran

Kharehpu Persian: خره پو
- Village
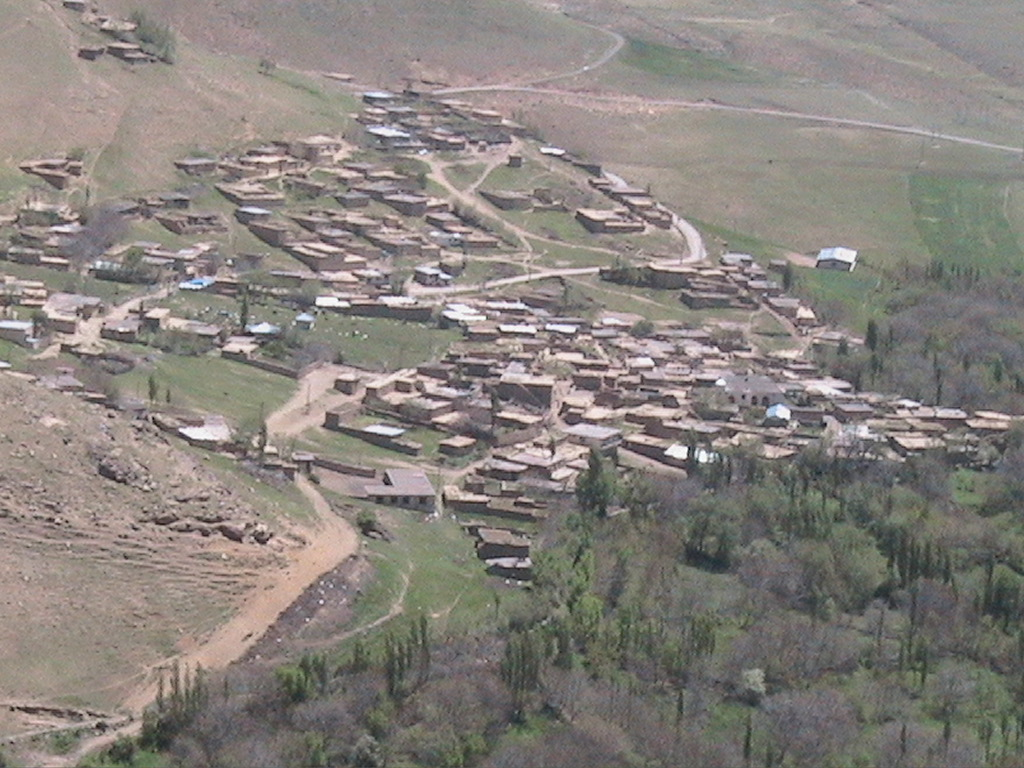
- The village of Kharehpu

- Location within Iran
- Coordinates: 36°44′09″N 49°52′20″E
- Country: Iran
- Province: Gilan
- County: Rudbar
- District: Amarlu
- Rural District: Kalisham

Population (2016)
  - Total: 264
- Time zone: UTC+3:30 (IRST)

Kharehpu (Persian: خره پو) (Note: Also romanized as Kharehpū; also known as Kharapu and Khorramkoh) is a village in Kalisham Rural District of Amarlu District in Rudbar County, Gilan province, Iran.

== Demographics ==
=== Population ===
At the time of the 2006 National Census, the village's population was 343 in 107 households. The following census in 2011 counted 227 people in 90 households. The 2016 census measured the population of the village as 264 people in 108 households.

== See also ==
- 1990 Manjil–Rudbar earthquake

== Sources ==
- سایت روستای خُرّمکوه
- E. Arabani Modified: book Gilan
- Specified culture
- Lexicon Dehkhoda
- Yasnt Louis Rabynv: Province Darlmrzgylan
- Book of Amarlu - M.M.Zand
