= Gerdelat =

Village in Gilan province, Iran

Gerdelat Persian: گردلات
- Village
- Location within Iran
- Coordinates: 36°37′18″N 49°54′35″E
- Country: Iran
- Province: Gilan
- County: Rudbar
- District: Amarlu
- Rural District: Kalisham

Population (2016)
  - Total: 40
- Time zone: UTC+3:30 (IRST)

Gerdelat (Persian: گردلات) (Note: Also romanized as Gerdelāt; also known as Gerdeh Lāt) is a village in Kalisham Rural District of Amarlu District in Rudbar County, Gilan province, Iran.

== Demographics ==
=== Population ===
At the time of the 2006 National Census, the village's population was 47 in 13 households. The following census in 2011 counted 28 people in eight households. The 2016 census measured the population of the village as 40 people in 14 households.
