= Zard Kesh =

Zard Kesh زردكش
- Village
- Location within Iran
- Coordinates: 36°36′12″N 49°44′22″E
- Country: Iran
- Province: Gilan
- County: Rudbar
- Bakhsh: Amarlu
- Rural District: Jirandeh

Population (2016)
  - Total: 26
- Time zone: UTC+3:30 (IRST)

Zard Kesh (Persian: زردكش) is a village in Jirandeh Rural District, Amarlu District, Rudbar County, Gilan Province, Iran. At the 2016 census, its population was 26, in 9 families.
