= Eskabon =

Eskabon اسكابن
- Village
- Location within Iran
- Coordinates: 36°40′23″N 49°45′13″E
- Country: Iran
- Province: Gilan
- County: Rudbar
- Bakhsh: Amarlu
- Rural District: Jirandeh

Population (2016)
  - Total: 68
- Time zone: UTC+3:30 (IRST)

Eskabon (Persian: اسكابن, also Romanized as Eskābon, Āskābon, and Eskaban; also known as Askabun) is a village in Jirandeh Rural District, Amarlu District, Rudbar County, Gilan Province, Iran. At the 2016 census, its population was 68, in 23 families. Up from 44 people in 2006.
