= Dasht Raz =

Dasht Raz دشترز
- Village
- Location within Iran
- Coordinates: 36°36′41″N 49°45′52″E
- Country: Iran
- Province: Gilan
- County: Rudbar
- Bakhsh: Amarlu
- Rural District: Jirandeh

Population (2016)
  - Total: 72
- Time zone: UTC+3:30 (IRST)

Dasht Raz (Persian: دشترز; also known as Dasht Zar) is a village in Jirandeh Rural District, Amarlu District, Rudbar County, Gilan Province, Iran. At the 2016 census, its population was 72, in 20 families. Up from 64 in 2006.
