= Pa Rudbar =

Village in Gilan province, Iran

Pa Rudbar Persian: پارودبار
- Village
- Location within Iran
- Coordinates: 36°37′03″N 49°43′47″E
- Country: Iran
- Province: Gilan
- County: Rudbar
- District: Amarlu
- Rural District: Jirandeh

Population (2016)
  - Total: 302
- Time zone: UTC+3:30 (IRST)

Pa Rudbar (Persian: پارودبار) (Note: Also romanized as Pā Rūdbār; also known as Parūdār) is a village in Jirandeh Rural District of Amarlu District in Rudbar County, Gilan province, Iran.

== Demographics ==
=== Population ===
At the time of the 2006 National Census, the village's population was 427 in 104 households. The following census in 2011 counted 259 people in 89 households. The 2016 census measured the population of the village as 302 people in 106 households.
