= Bivarzin =

Village in Gilan province, Iran

Bivarzin Persian: بيورزين
- Village

- Location within Iran
- Coordinates: 36°40′48″N 49°34′34″E
- Country: Iran
- Province: Gilan
- County: Rudbar
- District: Amarlu
- Rural District: Jirandeh

Population (2016)
  - Total: 278
- Time zone: UTC+3:30 (IRST)

Bivarzin (Persian: بيورزين) (Note: Also romanized as Bīvarzīn; also known as Bevarzan and Bīvarzan) is a village in Jirandeh Rural District of Amarlu District in Rudbar County, Gilan province, Iran.

== Demographics ==
=== Population ===
At the time of the 2006 National Census, the village's population was 88 in 29 households. The following census in 2011 counted 194 people in 60 households. The 2016 census measured the population of the village as 278 people in 88 households.
