= Sangrud Mine =

Madan-e Sangrud معدن سنگرود
- Mine
- Location within Iran
- Coordinates: 36°39′40″N 49°39′16″E
- Country: Iran
- Province: Gilan
- County: Rudbar
- Bakhsh: Amarlu
- Rural District: Jirandeh

Population (2006)
  - Total: 352
- Time zone: UTC+3:30 (IRST)

West alborz Mine (Persian: معدن البرز غربی, also Romanized as Maʿdan-e alborze gharbi ) is a village in Jirandeh Rural District, Amarlu District, Rudbar County, Gilan Province, Iran. At the 2016 census, its population was 96, in 32 families. Decreased from 352 people in 2006.

The village's name comes from the nearby coal mining site.

The lands and facilities of this mine are all located on the lands of Pakdeh village.

== History ==
Extraction work from the west alborz mine, with a covered area of 3,600 hectares in the Amarlu region of Rudbar, began in the early 1960s.

During an incident in June 1997, 20 workers lost their lives instantly, and about 50 workers were sent to hospitals inside and outside the country.

It was closed in January 2015 due to economic problems and the depletion of extracted reserves, and this closure resulted in the unemployment of about 370 workers and employees of the mine. It also has led to a decrease in coal production in Gilan province, which has seriously damaged coal-related industries. On the other hand, the closure has had a negative impact on the economy of Rudbar County, especially the Amarlu district, and has led to a decrease in income and economic prosperity in the region.
