= Pakdeh =

Village in Gilan province, Iran

Pakdeh Persian: پاكده
- Village
- Location within Iran
- Coordinates: 36°40′56″N 49°45′35″E
- Country: Iran
- Province: Gilan
- County: Rudbar
- District: Amarlu
- Rural District: Jirandeh

Population (2016)
  - Total: 590
- Time zone: UTC+3:30 (IRST)

Pakdeh (Persian: پاكده) (Note: Also romanized as Pāk Deh and Pākdeh; also known as Pagodekh, Pākīdeh, Pāyadi, and Paydeh) is a village in Jirandeh Rural District of Amarlu District in Rudbar County, Gilan province, Iran.

== Demographics ==
=== Population ===
At the time of the 2006 National Census, the village's population was 612 in 210 households. The following census in 2011 counted 630 people in 223 households. The 2016 census measured the population of the village as 590 people in 214 households. It was the most populous village in its rural district.
