= Damash =

Village in Gilan province, Iran

Damash Persian: داماش
- Village
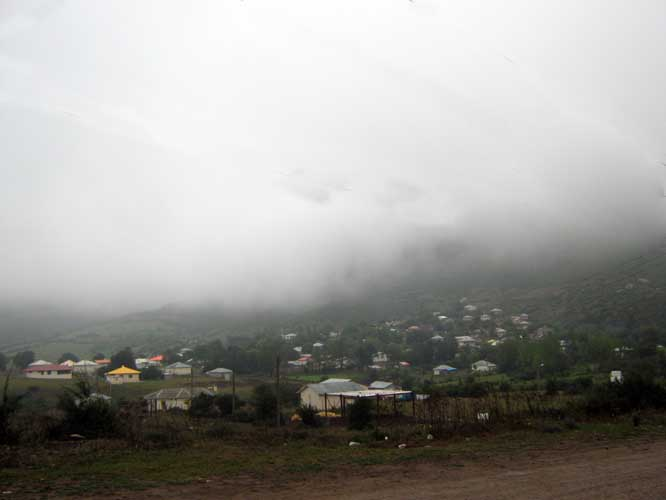
- The village of Damash

- Location within Iran
- Coordinates: 36°45′17″N 49°48′36″E
- Country: Iran
- Province: Gilan
- County: Rudbar
- District: Amarlu
- Rural District: Jirandeh

Population (2016)
  - Total: 337
- Time zone: UTC+3:30 (IRST)

Damash (Persian: داماش) (Note: Also romanized as Dāmāsh and Dāmash; also known as Dāmāshak) is a village in Jirandeh Rural District of Amarlu District in Rudbar County, Gilan province, Iran. Lilium ledebourii is its natural plant, the population speaks Gilaki like most of North-Western area of Iran’s Caspian bordering places.

== Demographics ==
=== Population ===
At the time of the 2006 National Census, the village's population was 251 in 89 households. The following census in 2011 counted 149 people in 65 households. The 2016 census measured the population of the village as 337 people in 115 households.

== Sources ==
- Book of Amarlu – M.M. Zand
