= Devil's Gap Road =

Street in Gibraltar, United Kingdom

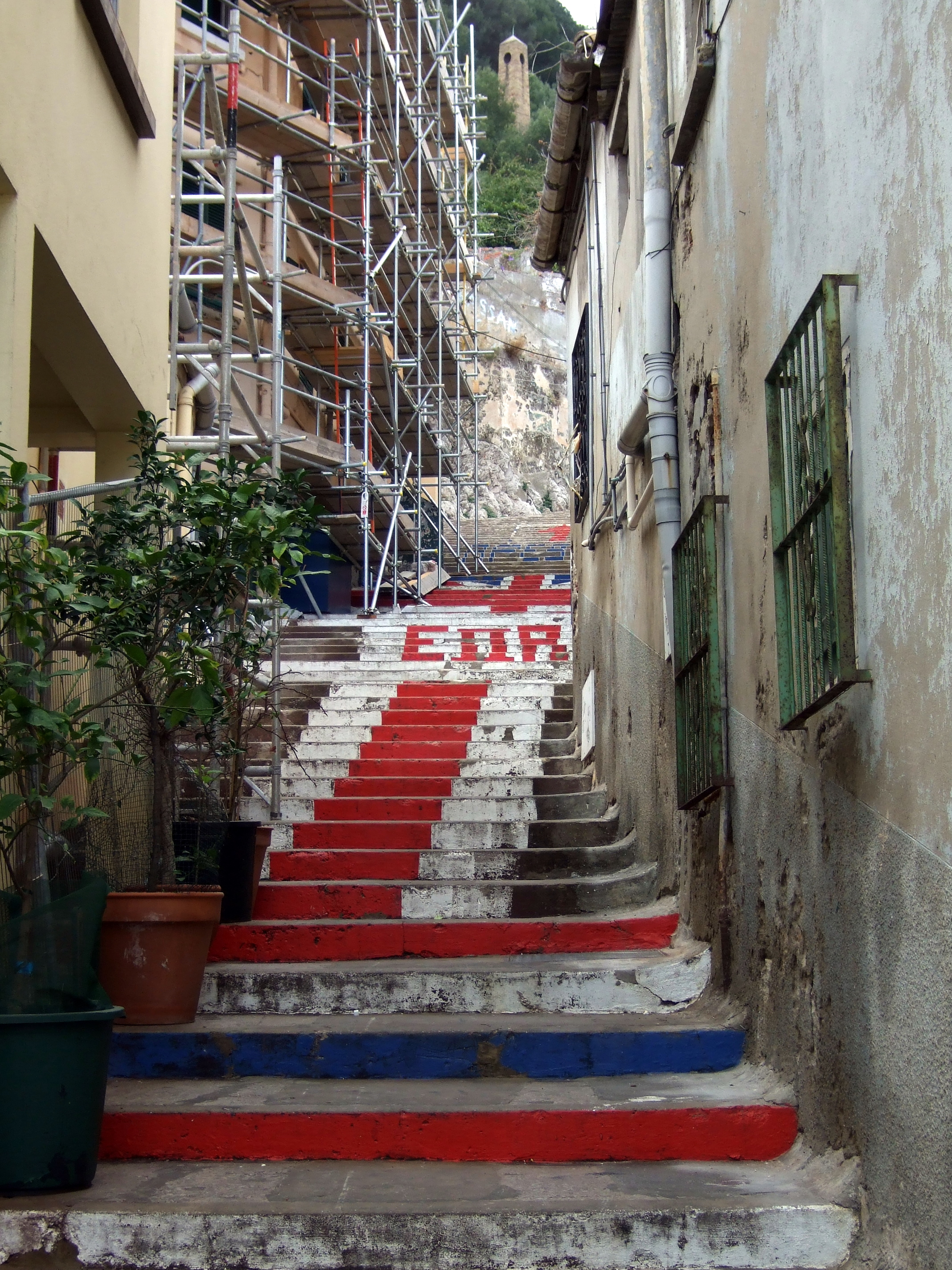
- Devils Gap Road: the steps have been painted with the Union Flag ever since Gibraltar's first sovereignty referendum.
- Interactive map of Devil's Gap Road
- Native name: Escalera del Monte (Spanish)
- Location: Gibraltar
- Coordinates: 36.138473°N 5.351123°W

Devil's Gap Road (Escalera del Monte in Spanish) is a street in the British Overseas Territory of Gibraltar.

== Description ==
It lies between its junction with Flat Bastion Road in the southern direction and joins Baca's Passage in the northern direction. This street is the quickest route by foot from the city centre to the Upper Rock Nature Reserve. The Devil's Gap Footpath leads up from where Devil's Gap Road meets Baca's Passage and joins Green Lane near Devil's Gap Battery in the nature reserve.

== Painting ==
The street is also known as the Union Jack Steps or Referendum Steps and was originally painted in 1967 to celebrate Gibraltar's first sovereignty referendum of that year. In August 2011, the steps were repainted in red, white, and blue by volunteers intent on restoring the period graffiti.
