= Guvard =

Guvard گوورد
- Village
- Location within Iran
- Coordinates: 36°35′23″N 49°52′48″E
- Country: Iran
- Province: Gilan
- County: Rudbar
- Bakhsh: Amarlu
- Rural District: Jirandeh

Population (2006)
  - Total: 160
- Time zone: UTC+3:30 (IRST)

Guvard (Persian: گوورد, also Romanized as Gūvard; also known as Gūrd) is a village in Jirandeh Rural District, Amarlu District, Rudbar County, Gilan Province, Iran. At the 2016 census, its population was 121, in 38 families. Down from 160 in 2006.
