= Naveh, Amarlu =

Village in Gilan province, Iran

Naveh Persian: ناوه
- Village
- Location within Iran
- Coordinates: 36°42′38″N 49°54′09″E
- Country: Iran
- Province: Gilan
- County: Rudbar
- District: Amarlu
- Rural District: Kalisham

Population (2016)
  - Total: 98
- Time zone: UTC+3:30 (IRST)

Naveh (Persian: ناوه) (Note: Also romanized as Nāveh; also known as Navakh and Nāveh Khān) is a village in Kalisham Rural District of Amarlu District in Rudbar County, Gilan province, Iran.

== Demographics ==
=== Population ===
At the time of the 2006 National Census, the village's population was 149 in 41 households. The following census in 2011 counted 93 people in 32 households. The 2016 census measured the population of the village as 98 people in 33 households.
