= Anbuh =

Village in Gilan province, Iran

Anbuh Persian: انبوه
- Village
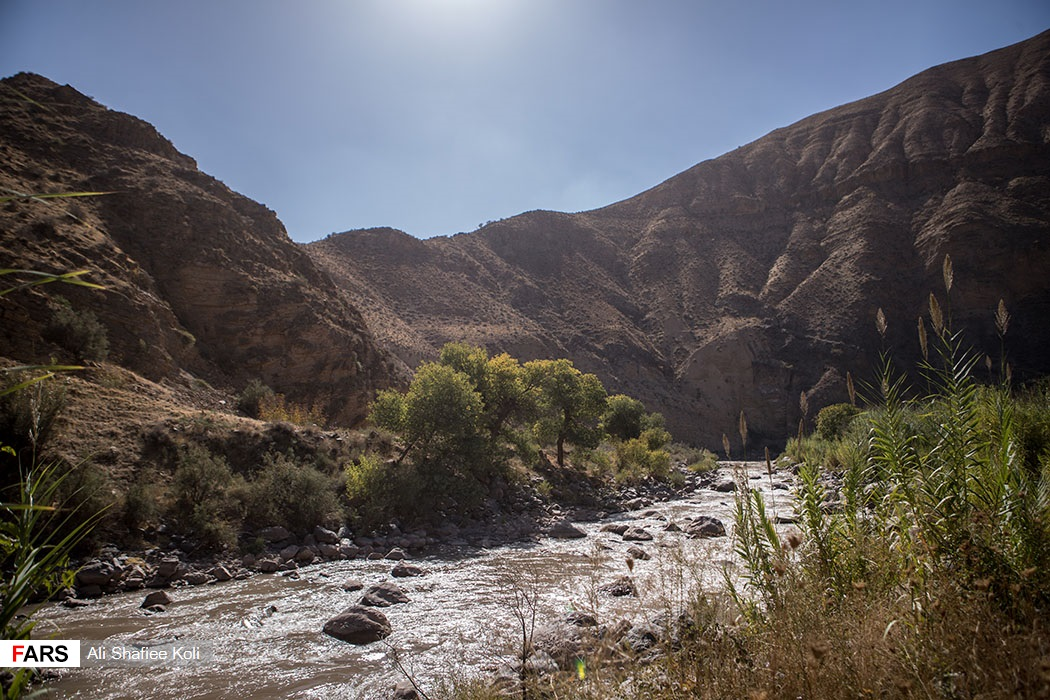
- Landscape near the village of Anbuh

- Location within Iran
- Coordinates: 36°39′32″N 49°59′29″E
- Country: Iran
- Province: Gilan
- County: Rudbar
- District: Amarlu
- Rural District: Kalisham

Population (2016)
  - Total: 531
- Time zone: UTC+3:30 (IRST)

Anbuh (Persian: انبوه) (Note: Also romanized as Anbūh; also known as Anbukh and Anbūn) is a village in Kalisham Rural District of Amarlu District in Rudbar County, Gilan province, Iran.

== Demographics ==
=== Population ===
At the time of the 2006 National Census, the village's population was 613 in 177 households. The following census in 2011 counted 528 people in 195 households. The 2016 census measured the population of the village as 531 people in 208 households.
