= Layeh =

Village in Gilan province, Iran

Layeh Persian: لايه
- Village
- Location within Iran
- Coordinates: 36°38′08″N 49°57′18″E
- Country: Iran
- Province: Gilan
- County: Rudbar
- District: Amarlu
- Rural District: Kalisham

Population (2016)
  - Total: 144
- Time zone: UTC+3:30 (IRST)

Layeh (Persian: لايه) (Note: Also romanized as Lāyah, Layeh, and Layyeh; also known as Layakh) is a village in Kalisham Rural District of Amarlu District in Rudbar County, Gilan province, Iran.

== Demographics ==
=== Population ===
At the time of the 2006 National Census, the village's population was 181 in 47 households. The following census in 2011 counted 131 people in 48 households. The 2016 census measured the population of the village as 144 people in 54 households.
