= Zakabar =

Village in Gilan province, Iran

Zakabar Persian: زكابر
- Village
- Location within Iran
- Coordinates: 36°35′35″N 49°49′07″E
- Country: Iran
- Province: Gilan
- County: Rudbar
- District: Amarlu
- Rural District: Jirandeh

Population (2016)
  - Total: 135
- Time zone: UTC+3:30 (IRST)

Zakabar (Persian: زكابر) (Note: Also romanized as Z̄akābar and Zokābar) is a village in Jirandeh Rural District of Amarlu District in Rudbar County, Gilan province, Iran.

== Demographics ==
=== Population ===
At the time of the 2006 National Census, the village's population was 119 in 27 households. The following census in 2011 counted 76 people in 22 households. The 2016 census measured the population of the village as 135 people in 51 households.
