= Now Deh, Amarlu =

Village in Gilan province, Iran

Now Deh Persian: نوده
- Village
- Location within Iran
- Coordinates: 36°38′48″N 50°02′44″E
- Country: Iran
- Province: Gilan
- County: Rudbar
- District: Amarlu
- Rural District: Kalisham

Population (2016)
  - Total: 165
- Time zone: UTC+3:30 (IRST)

Now Deh (Persian: نوده) is a village in Kalisham Rural District of Amarlu District in Rudbar County, Gilan province, Iran.

== Demographics ==
=== Population ===
At the time of the 2006 National Census, the village's population was 185 in 57 households. The following census in 2011 counted 160 people in 58 households. The 2016 census measured the population of the village as 165 people in 73 households.
