= Yeknam =

Yeknam يكنم
- Village
- Location within Iran
- Coordinates: 36°42′56″N 49°51′49″E
- Country: Iran
- Province: Gilan
- County: Rudbar
- Bakhsh: Amarlu
- Rural District: Jirandeh

Population (2006)
  - Total: 152
- Time zone: UTC+3:30 (IRST)

Yeknam (Persian: يكنم, also Romanized as Yekonem and Yakonom; also known as Yakunim, Yakūnom, and Yekow Nīm) is a village in Jirandeh Rural District, Amarlu District, Rudbar County, Gilan Province, Iran. At the 2016 census, its population was 116, in 49 families. Down from 152 people in 2006.
