= Viyeh =

Village in Gilan province, Iran

Viyeh Persian: ويه
- Village
- Location within Iran
- Coordinates: 36°42′30″N 49°53′45″E
- Country: Iran
- Province: Gilan
- County: Rudbar
- District: Amarlu
- Rural District: Kalisham

Population (2016)
  - Total: 199
- Time zone: UTC+3:30 (IRST)

Viyeh (Persian: ويه) (Note: Also romanized as Veyeh, Viāh, Vīyāh, and Vīyeh; also known as Viakh) is a village in Kalisham Rural District of Amarlu District in Rudbar County, Gilan province, Iran.

== Demographics ==
=== Population ===
At the time of the 2006 National Census, the village's population was 272 in 92 households. The following census in 2011 counted 172 people in 69 households. The 2016 census measured the population of the village as 199 people in 81 households.
