= Sangrud =

Village in Gilan province, Iran

Sangrud Persian: سنگرود
- Village
- Location within Iran
- Coordinates: 36°39′40″N 49°39′14″E
- Country: Iran
- Province: Gilan
- County: Rudbar
- District: Amarlu
- Rural District: Jirandeh

Population (2016)
  - Total: 294
- Time zone: UTC+3:30 (IRST)

Sangrud (Persian: سنگرود) (Note: Also Romanized as Sangrūd) is a village in Jirandeh Rural District of Amarlu District in Rudbar County, Gilan province, Iran.

Sangrud (Norwegian surname) The surname Sangrud was given to inhabitants of the Sangrud farm (established before 1825) near Lesja, Oppland, Norway Many of the Sangrud, now Sangro, family still live in Norway, while others have come to the United States.

== Demographics ==
=== Population ===
At the time of the 2006 National Census, the village's population was 298 in 77 households. The following census in 2011 counted 247 people in 80 households. The 2016 census measured the population of the village as 294 people in 95 households.
