= Kareh Rud =

Kareh Rud كره رود
- Village
- Location within Iran
- Coordinates: 36°34′39″N 49°44′02″E
- Country: Iran
- Province: Gilan
- County: Rudbar
- Bakhsh: Amarlu
- Rural District: Jirandeh

Population (2006)
  - Total: 37
- Time zone: UTC+3:30 (IRST)

Kareh Rud (Persian: كره رود, also Romanized as Kareh Rūd) is a village in Jirandeh Rural District, Amarlu District, Rudbar County, Gilan Province, Iran. At the 2016 census, its population was 14, in 4 families. Down from 37 people in 2006.
