= Tovey Battery =

Artillery battery in Gibraltar

- Part of Fortifications of Gibraltar
- Gibraltar
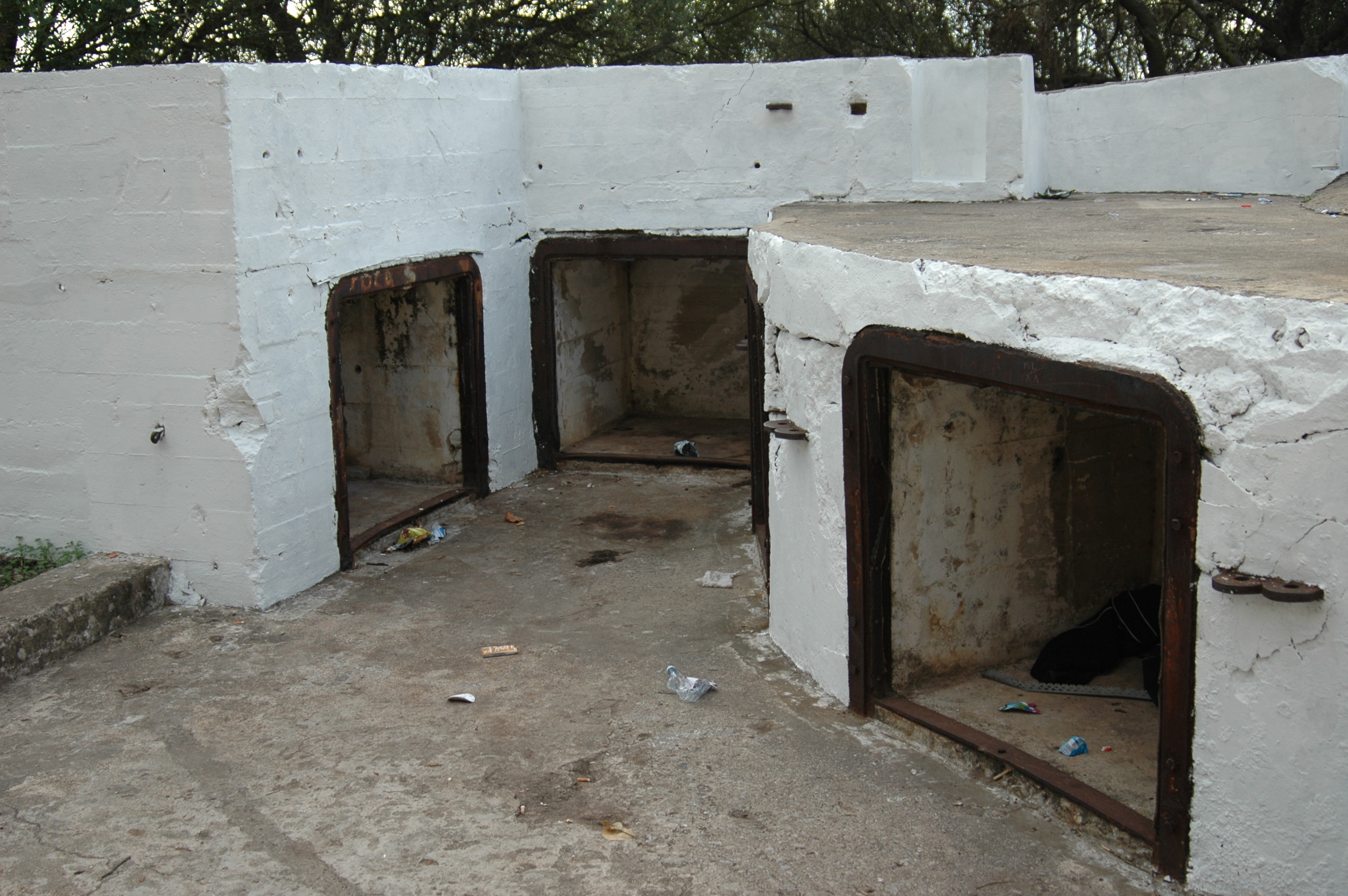

Site information
- Type: Artillery battery
- Owner: Ministry of Defence

Location
- Location in Gibraltar
- Coordinates: 36.142833°N 5.347949°W

Tovey Battery was an artillery battery in the British Overseas Territory of Gibraltar.

== Description ==
The battery is named after Colonel Tovey who was in Gibraltar and died here in November 1781 whilst he led the Royal Artillery during the Great Siege of Gibraltar.

Tovey battery had two 6 inch guns at the end of the nineteenth century which were part of fourteen available for close range defense. In 1911 Tovey's importance led to the closure of the inferior Hayne's Cave Battery which only had 4 inch guns.

The Tovey Battery had two six inch guns during World War II.
