= Manutchehr Salimi =

Iranian politician

Manutchehr Salimi Galangaschi was an Iranian politician from north of Iran, Amarlu District. He studied bachelor of Political Science. He received his PhD in International law from The National University of Iran (Daneschgah e Melli e Iran) in Tehran.

== Early life ==
He was born in Galangasch village, Amarlu District, Rudbar County, Gilan Province in Iran.

== Member of Parliament ==
He was a member of parliament from Rudbar County. He was elected by 11742 out of 19143 votes in 24th election for Iranian National Parliament. He was vice president of Parliamentary Commission for Rural Affairs.

== Death ==
He was executed in Evin Prison by Islamic Republicans.
