= 1967 Gibraltar sovereignty referendum =

- 10 September 1967
- "A) To pass under SPANISH sovereignty in accordance with the terms proposed by the SPANISH GOVERNMENT to the Government of the United Kingdom on 18th May, 1966 (which terms are set out in the Schedule to the Gibraltar (Referendum) Order 1967). B) Voluntarily to retain their link with the UNITED KINGDOM with democratic local institutions and with the UNITED KINGDOM retaining its present responsibilities."
- Outcome: Gibraltar Constitution Order 1969

Results
Choice	Votes	%
Spain	44	0.36%
United Kingdom	12,138	99.64%
Valid votes	12,182	99.55%
Invalid or blank votes	55	0.45%
Total votes	12,237	100.00%
Registered voters/turnout	12,672	96.57%

The Gibraltar sovereignty referendum of 1967 was held on 10 September 1967, in which Gibraltarian citizens were asked whether they wished to pass under Spanish sovereignty, with Gibraltarians keeping their British citizenship and a special status for Gibraltar within Spain; or remain under British sovereignty, with its own self-governing institutions.

== Overview ==
Further to resolution 2070 of the United Nations General Assembly that was approved on 16 December 1965, the governments of Spain and the United Kingdom started talks on Gibraltar in 1966. On 18 May 1966, the Spanish Minister of Foreign Affairs, Fernando Castiella made a formal proposal to Britain comprising three clauses:

1. The cancellation of the Treaty of Utrecht and the subsequent return of Gibraltar to Spain.
2. The presence of the British in the Royal Navy base in Gibraltar, its use being subject to a specific Anglo-Spanish agreement.
3. A "Personal Statute" for Gibraltarians, under United Nations guarantee, protecting their cultural, social and economic interest in Gibraltar or anywhere else in Spain, including their British nationality. "(An) appropriate [..] administrative formula" should also be agreed on.

The options presented to Gibraltarians in a referendum were:

1. To pass under Spanish sovereignty in accordance with the terms proposed by the Spanish Government; or
2. Retain their link with Britain, with democratic local institutions. Britain retaining its present responsibilities.

== Result ==
Gibraltar sovereignty referendum, 1967
Choice	Votes	%
Spanish sovereignty	44	0.36
British sovereignty	12,138	99.64
Total	12,182	100.00
Valid votes	12,182	99.55
Invalid/blank votes	55	0.45
Total votes	12,237	100.00
Registered voters/turnout	12,672	96.57

== Aftermath ==
A new constitution was passed in 1969. Gibraltar National Day has been celebrated annually on 10 September since 1992 to commemorate Gibraltar's first sovereignty referendum of 1967.

In 1969, the Spanish government closed the border between Spain and Gibraltar, cutting off all contacts and severely restricting movement. The border was not fully reopened until February 1985.

The Special Committee on Decolonization was informed in advance of the referendum and invited to observe. The invitation was declined and instead the UN General Assembly passed Resolution 2353, which requested that the United Kingdom enter negotiations with Spain (then under the dictatorship of General Franco) and criticised the United Kingdom for holding a referendum. Resolution 2353 (XXII) was supported by seventy-three countries (mainly Latin American, Arab, African and Eastern European countries), rejected by nineteen (United Kingdom and the countries of the Commonwealth of Nations), while twenty-seven countries abstained (Western Europe and the United States).

== Gallery ==
Related images
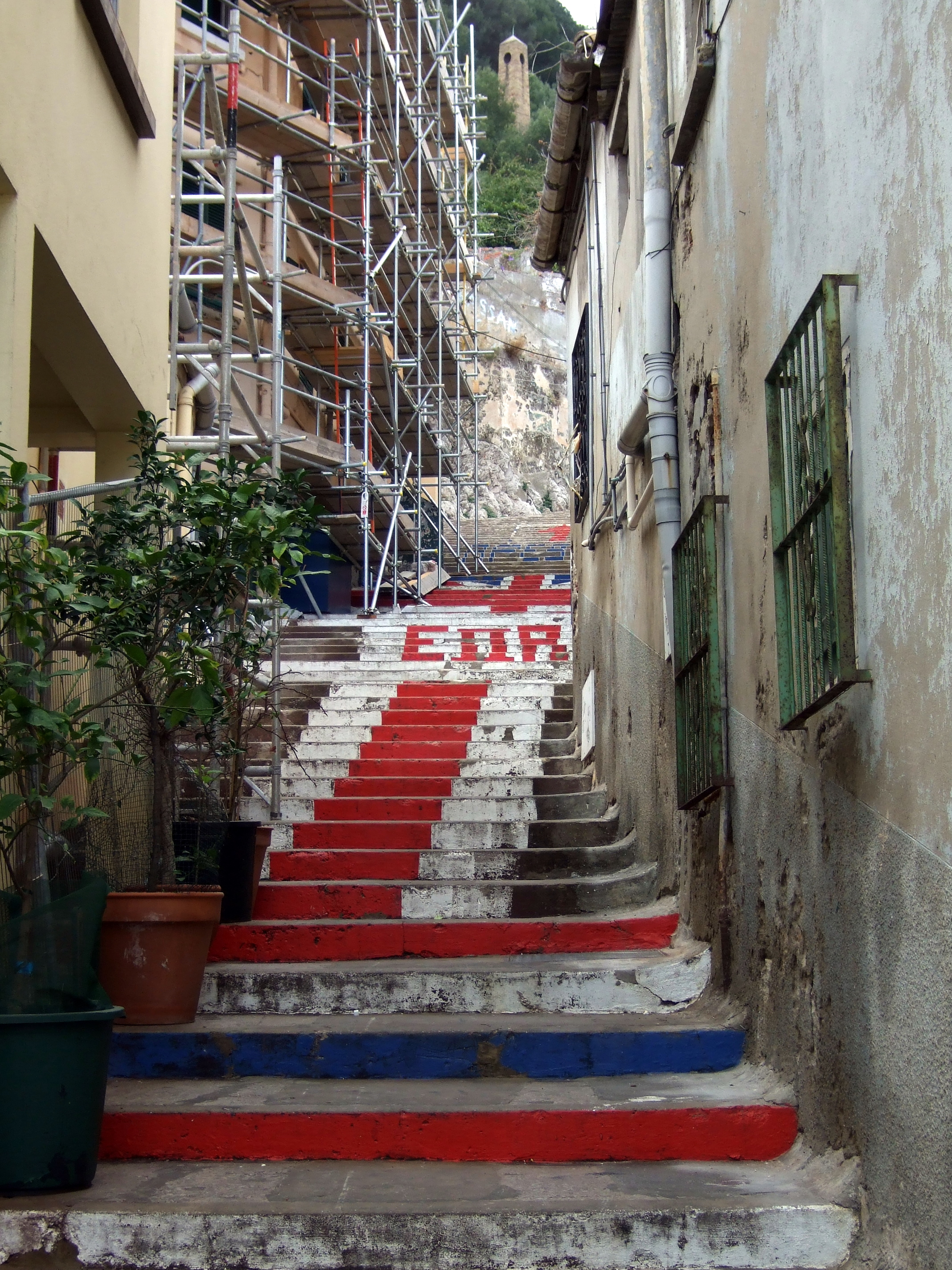
Devil's Gap Road in Gibraltar's Upper Town. The steps have been painted with the Union Flag ever since the referendum

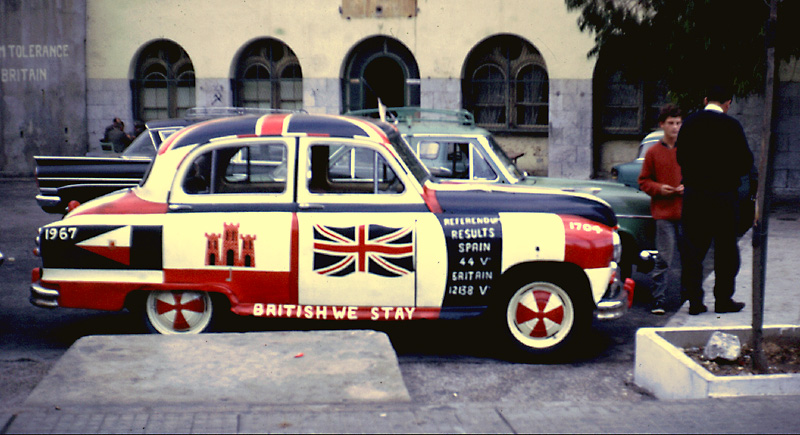
A car painted to celebrate the results of the referendum

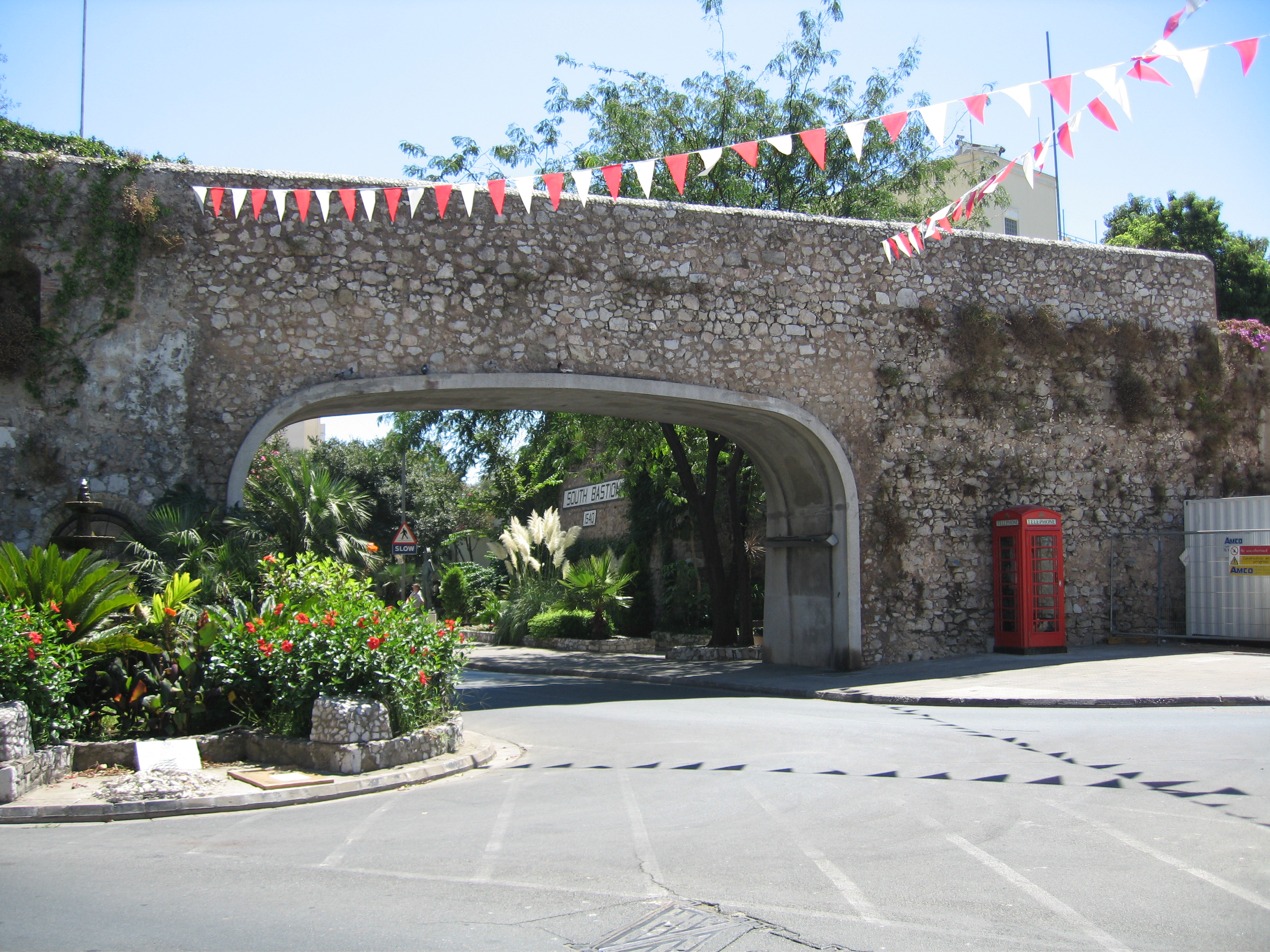
Referendum Gate at Southport Gates in Charles V Wall, Gibraltar. Named to commemorate the referendum

== See also ==
- 2002 Gibraltar sovereignty referendum

== See also ==
- Gibraltar Constitution Order 1969
- History of Gibraltar
