= Rooke Battery =

Derelict artillery battery in Gibraltar

- Part of Fortifications of Gibraltar
- Gibraltar
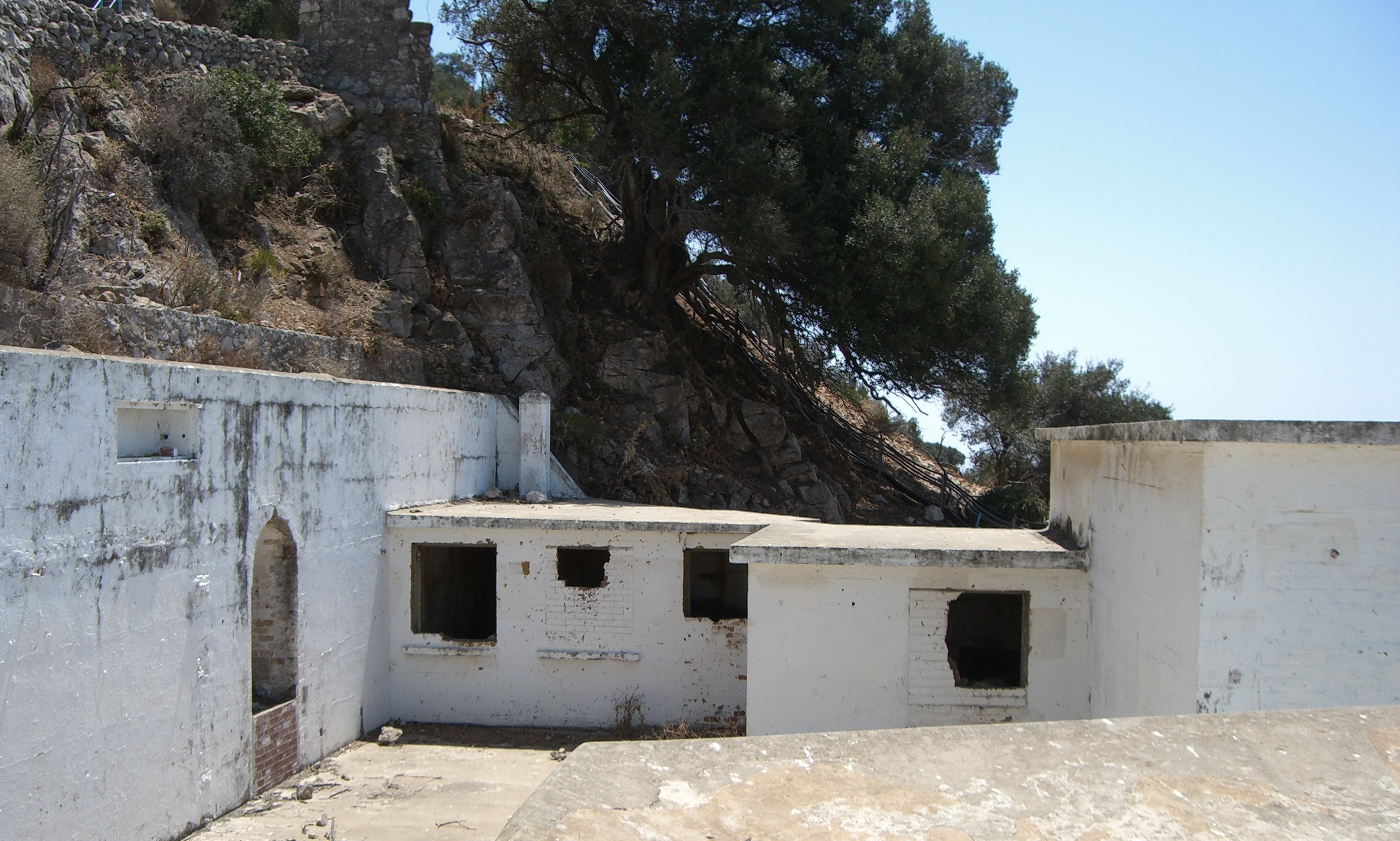
- Rooke Battery buildings

Site information
- Type: Artillery battery
- Owner: Ministry of Defence

Location
- Location in Gibraltar
- Coordinates: 36.130667°N 5.347845°W

Rooke Battery is a now derelict artillery battery on the west side of the British Overseas Territory of Gibraltar.

== Description ==
The derelict battery can now be found on the Royal Anglian Way which is named after the 2nd Battalion of the Royal Anglian Regiment, who refurbished it in August 1969. The path leads up the west side to the top of the Rock passing by this battery and Hayne's Cave Battery.

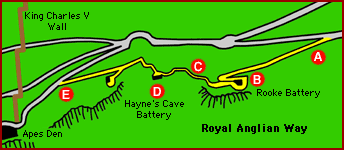
Location of the battery

The battery has a plaque labelled "1906" and it is named after Sir George Rooke who commanded the British Fleet when Gibraltar came under British rule.

This battery's in 1907 had a BL 9.2 inch gun Mk IX–X on a Mk. V mounting which was protected against severe damage because it had an underground magazine and shelter. The popular 9.2-inch guns were also installed high on the rock at Spur Battery, Breakneck Battery and similar locations. The gun is known to have still been here in 1928.

Visitors can see the remains of the searchlight which was used during World War II when the battery was also a Fire Command headquarters which could direct the fire of other batteries.
