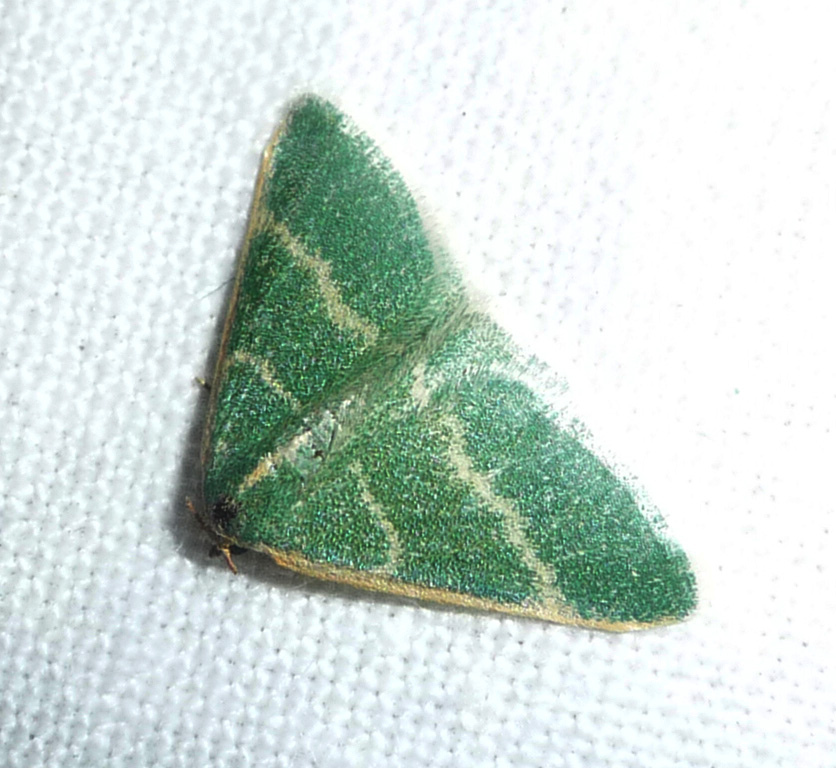
- Microloxia herbaria, Spain

Scientific classification
- Kingdom: Animalia
- Phylum: Arthropoda
- Class: Insecta
- Order: Lepidoptera
- Family: Geometridae
- Subfamily: Geometrinae
- Tribe: Hemitheini
- Genus: Microloxia; Warren, 1893

= Microloxia =

Genus of moths

Microloxia is a genus of moths family in the family Geometridae described by Warren in 1893. There are about nine described species in Microloxia.

== Species ==
These species belong to the genus Microloxia:

- Microloxia aistleitneri Hausmann, 2009 (Cape Verde Islands)
- Microloxia chlorissoides (Prout, 1912) (eastern Asia)
- Microloxia herbaria (Hubner, 1813) (Herb Emerald) (Europe, North Africa)
- Microloxia indecretata (Walker, [1863]) (India, southwest Asia)
- Microloxia leprosa Hampson, 1893
- Microloxia ruficornis Warren, 1897 (Africa and temperate Asia)
- Microloxia schmitzi Hausmann, 1995 (northwestern Africa, Spain)
- Microloxia simonyi (Rebel, 1894) (Canary Islands)
- Microloxia stenopteraria Turati, 1930 (North Africa)
