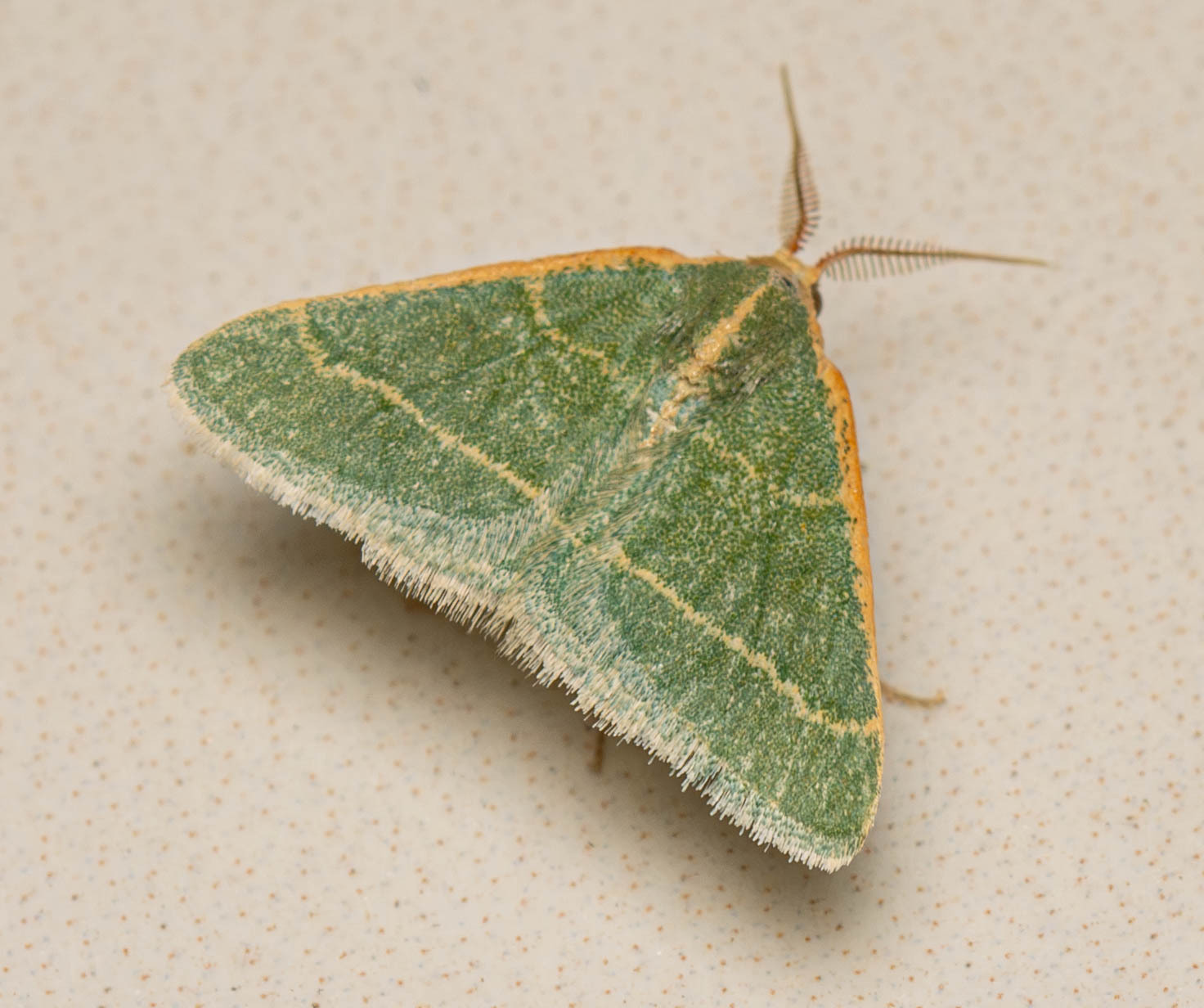
- Microloxia ruficornis, South Africa

Scientific classification
- Kingdom: Animalia
- Phylum: Arthropoda
- Class: Insecta
- Order: Lepidoptera
- Family: Geometridae
- Subfamily: Geometrinae
- Tribe: Hemitheini
- Genus: Microloxia
- Species: M. ruficornis

Binomial name
- Microloxia ruficornis Warren, 1897

Synonyms
- Eucrostes halimaria Chrétien, 1909; Eucrostes innotata Warren, 1901; Microloxia halimaria (Chrétien, 1909); Microloxia innotata (Warren, 1901)

= Microloxia ruficornis =

Species of moths

Microloxia ruficornis is a species of emerald moth in the family Geometridae. It is found in Africa and temperate Asia.
