= Hayne's Cave Battery =

Artillery battery in Gibraltar

- Part of Fortifications of Gibraltar
- Gibraltar
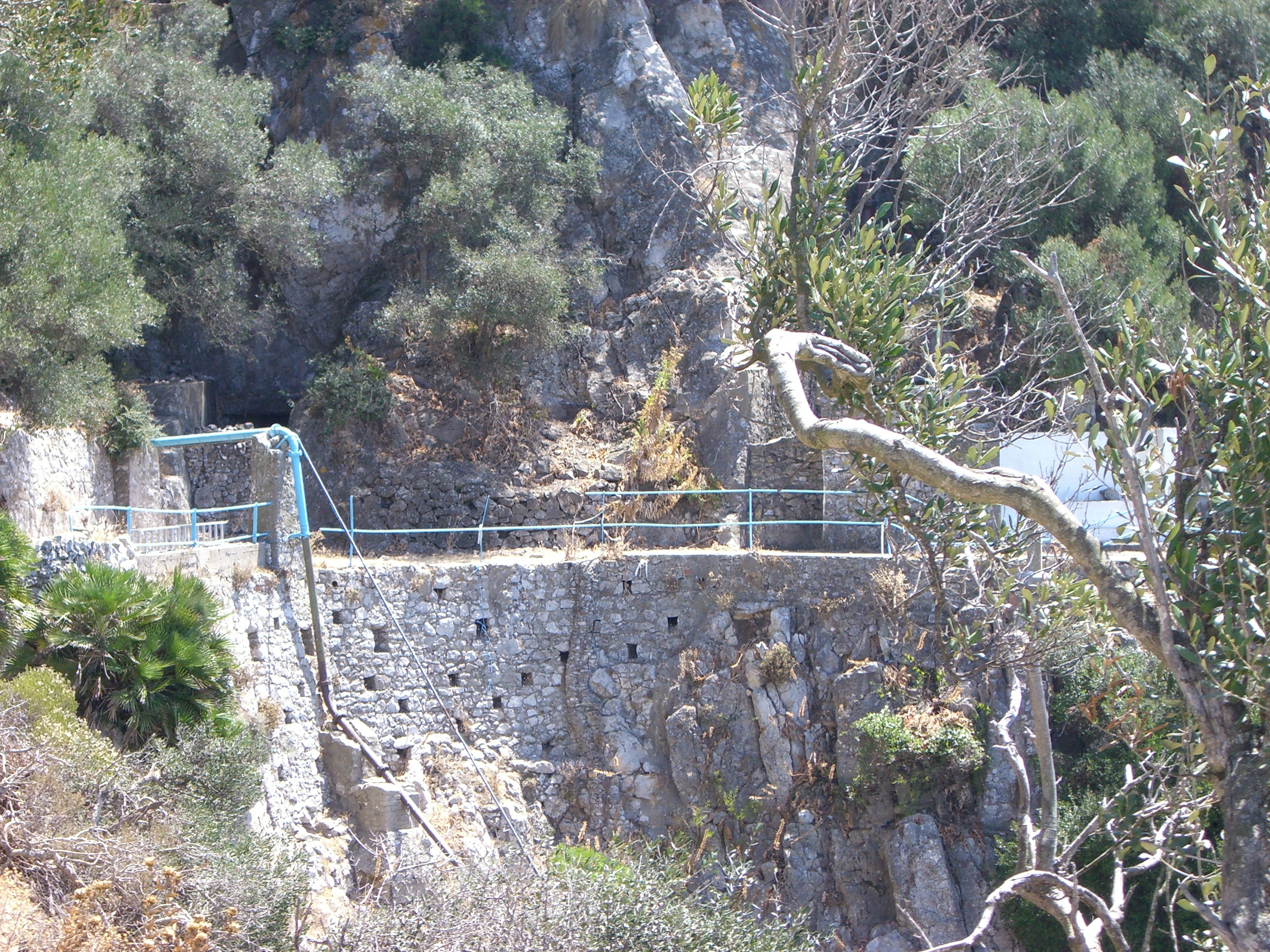
- Haynes Cave Battery

Site information
- Type: Artillery battery
- Owner: Ministry of Defence

Location
- Location in Gibraltar
- Coordinates: 36.129925°N 5.347662°W

Hayne's Cave Battery is the remains of two gun positions that made up an artillery battery on the west side of the British Overseas Territory of Gibraltar at Hayne's Cave. Gun emplacements can still be visited at this cave.

== Description ==
=== Location ===
Upper Rock, Queen's Road. The derelict battery can now be found on the Royal Anglian Way which is named after the 2nd Battalion of the Royal Anglian Regiment, who refurbished it in August 1969. The path leads up the west side to the top of the rock passing by this battery, some military support buildings and Rooke Battery.

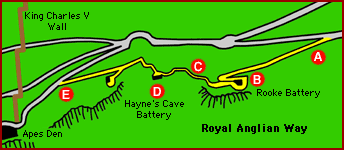
Location of the battery

=== History ===
First occupied during the Great Siege of Gibraltar (1779-1783). The battery dates from 1788 although it has a plaque labelled "1903" It is named as the nearby Hayne's Cave. This battery was named after Captain Haynes who was the garrison quartermaster in 1787-1788 and who began the construction of Queen's Road. Visitors can see the remains of one of the two 4-inch QF gun positions which were installed in 1904 and are about 40 metres apart. In 1911 the guns were removed in favour of the superior 6 inch guns of Tovey Battery.

The cave itself was eventually taken over for water tanks and pumps.
