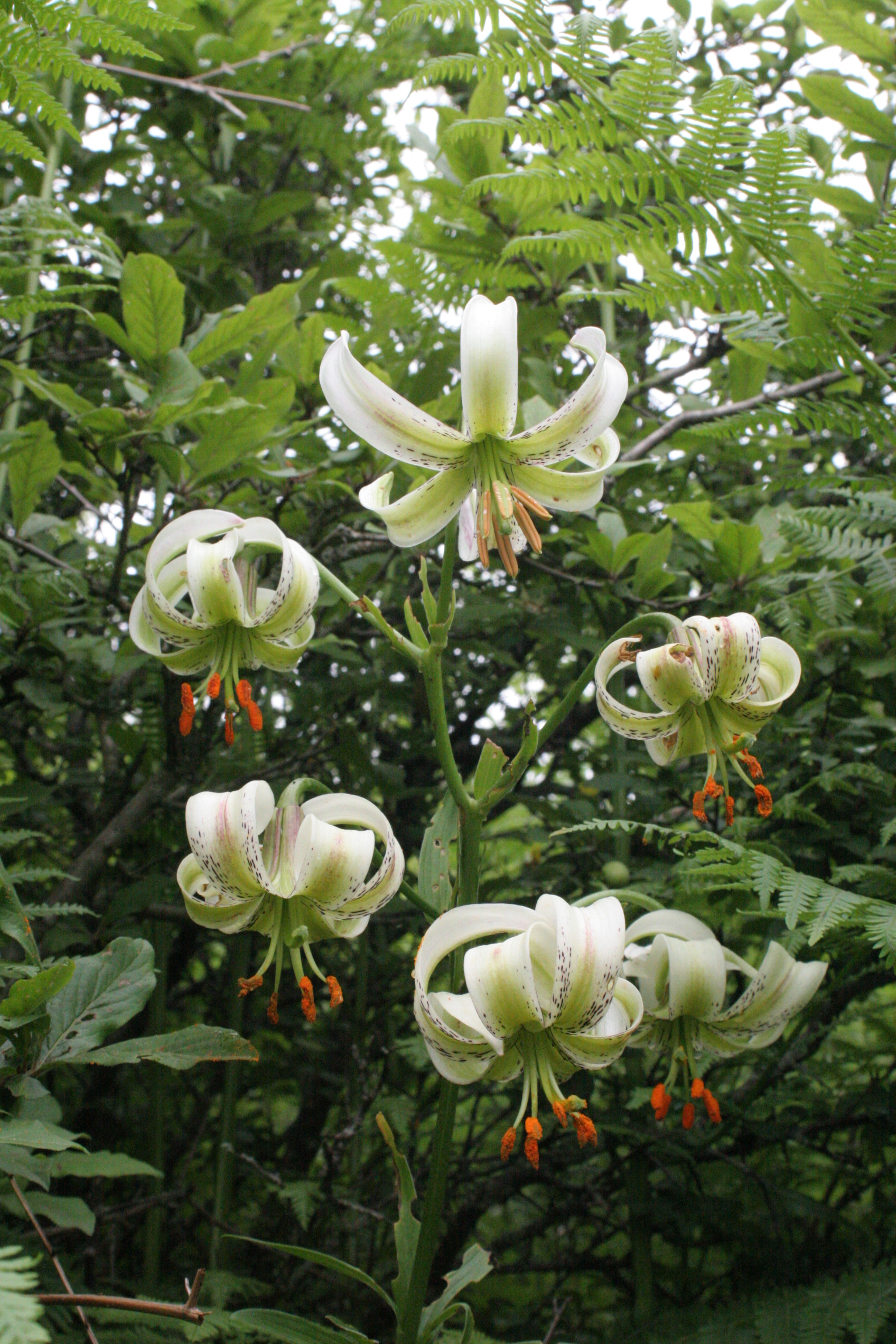
- Lilium ledebourii

Scientific classification
- Kingdom: Plantae
- Clade: Tracheophytes
- Clade: Angiosperms
- Clade: Monocots
- Order: Liliales
- Family: Liliaceae
- Subfamily: Lilioideae
- Genus: Lilium
- Species: L. ledebourii

Binomial name
- Lilium ledebourii (Baker) Boiss.

Synonyms
- Lilium monadelphum var. ledebourii Baker

= Lilium ledebourii =

Species of plant in the lily family

Lilium ledebourii (Persian: سوسن چلچراغ, romanized: Sousan-e Chehel Cheraagh; Azerbaijani: Ledebur zanbağı) is a rare Asian species of plants in the lily family. It was named for German-Estonian botanist Carl Friedrich von Ledebour (1786–1851). Its native range is the Talish region of Azerbaijan, and Damasch in the Amarlu region of Iran.

Lilium ledebourii flowers from the middle of May until the end of May. The Damasch region is protected by the Department of Environment of Iran. The flower is called Sousan-e Chehel Cheraagh in Iran and the local area and its appearance is one of the most striking features in the area at the time of blooming.

== Description ==
Lilium ledebourii is a persistent herbaceous plant that grows 50–150 centimeters (20–59 in) tall. The yellow bulbs are oval and reach a diameter of 5–7 centimeters (2.0–2.8 in); they are highly segmented, and the scales are lance-shaped.

The stem is strong and straight. The leaves stand upright, and have fine hairs on the edge; their shape is linear to lance-shaped. They are 10–14 centimeters (3.9–5.5 in) long, and 1–2 centimeters (0.4–0.8 in) wide.

The monoecious plant blooms in June and July with a panicle of one to fifteen fragrant flowers. The flowers are actinomorphic and attached on up to 13-centimeter-long petioles. The bracts are lanceolate, and blue at the top. The six tepals are strongly reflexed and form a tiara of 4–6 cm (1.6–2.4 in) in diameter. The basic color of the flower is white, turning green towards the base and purple towards the tepal-tips. The filaments are green, and the pollen bright red. The seed capsule, which has the shape of an inverted egg, is approximately hexagonal, 3–4.5 cm (1.2–1.8 in) long and 2.5–3.2 cm (1.0–1.3 in) centimeters wide. The seeds ripen until September, and their germination is delayed-epigeous: the leaves that the seedling had as an embryo become photosynthetic once they emerge from the soil.

== Habitat ==
Lilium ledebourii occurs at altitudes around 2,100 meters (6,900 ft). It needs a dry, sunny position in well-drained soil, it is very susceptible to moisture. In June 2012 Dr. M.R. Asef an Iranian Mycologist and researcher found Lilium ledebourii from Vaz forest in Noor (Mazandaran province)at altitudes around 1670 meter .
