= Douglas Cave =

Cave in Gibraltar

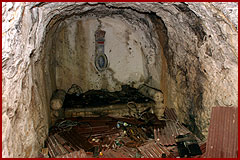
- inside the cave

- Location within Gibraltar
- Coordinates: 36°07′39.6″N 5°20′42.5″W

Douglas Cave is a cave in the British Overseas Territory of Gibraltar.

== Description ==
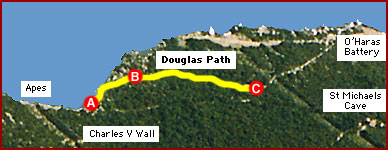
Douglas Path runs from A near the Charles V Wall past B World War II Observation Post and then down to Douglas Cave

=== Location ===
Douglas Cave is at the bottom of Douglas Path which runs north–south along the top ridge of the Rock of Gibraltar on the road leading up to O'Hara's Battery, all within the Upper Rock Nature Reserve.

=== History ===
First occupied during the Great Siege of Gibraltar (1779-1783). Re-occupied in 1940, the cave is, unusually, inside a brick building and contains a single stone seat and the remains of a simple plaque. The reason for this construction is unknown, although some upper rock camping experts believe it was used to store a high-powered searchlight during WWII.

== See also ==
- List of caves in Gibraltar
