= Kalisham, Gilan =

Village in Gilan province, Iran

Kalisham Persian: كليشم
- Village
- Location within Iran
- Coordinates: 36°44′45″N 49°56′12″E
- Country: Iran
- Province: Gilan
- County: Rudbar
- District: Amarlu
- Rural District: Kalisham

Population (2016)
  - Total: 747
- Time zone: UTC+3:30 (IRST)

Kalisham (Persian: كليشم) (Note: Also romanized as Kelīshom; also known as Kel-e-Qum and Kilishum) is a village in, and the capital of, Kalisham Rural District in Amarlu District of Rudbar County, Gilan province, Iran.

== Demographics ==
=== Population ===
At the time of the 2006 National Census, the village's population was 704 in 224 households. The following census in 2011 counted 644 people in 241 households. The 2016 census measured the population of the village as 747 people in 287 households. It was the most populous village in its rural district.
