= Jirandeh Rural District =

Rural district in Gilan province, Iran

Jirandeh Rural District Persian: دهستان جيرنده
- Rural District
- Location within Iran
- Coordinates: 36°39′N 49°44′E
- Country: Iran
- Province: Gilan
- County: Rudbar
- District: Amarlu
- Established: 1987
- Capital: Jirandeh

Population (2016)
  - Total: 2,656
- Time zone: UTC+3:30 (IRST)

Jirandeh Rural District (Persian: دهستان جيرنده) is in Amarlu District of Rudbar County, Gilan province, Iran. It is administered from the city of Jirandeh.

== Demographics ==
=== Population ===
At the time of the 2006 National Census, the rural district's population was 2,826 in 829 households. There were 2,372 inhabitants in 829 households at the following census of 2011. The 2016 census measured the population of the rural district as 2,656 in 928 households. The most populous of its 21 villages was Pakdeh, with 590 people.

=== Other villages in the rural district ===
- Aineh Deh
- Bivarzin
- Damash
- Dasht Raz
- Eskabon
- Guvard
- Karamak-e Bala
- Kareh Rud
- Madan-e Sangrud
- Pa Rudbar
- Sangrud
- Yeknam
- Zakabar
- Zard Kesh
