= Kalisham Rural District =

Rural district in Gilan province, Iran

Kalisham Rural District Persian: دهستان كليشم
- Rural District
- Location within Iran
- Coordinates: 36°43′N 49°58′E
- Country: Iran
- Province: Gilan
- County: Rudbar
- District: Amarlu
- Established: 1987
- Capital: Kalisham

Population (2016)
  - Total: 2,232
- Time zone: UTC+3:30 (IRST)

Kalisham Rural District (Persian: دهستان كليشم) is in Amarlu District of Rudbar County, Gilan province, Iran. Its capital is the village of Kalisham.

== Demographics ==
=== Population ===
At the time of the 2006 National Census, the rural district's population was 2,528 in 767 households. There were 2,004 inhabitants in 750 households at the following census of 2011. The 2016 census measured the population of the rural district as 2,232 in 870 households. The most populous of its 11 villages was Kalisham, with 747 people.

According to 2016 census, there were 11 settlements in the rural district, with two having no residents at the time.

=== Other villages in the rural district ===
- Anbuh
- Dogasar
- Gerdelat
- Kharehpu
- Layeh
- Naveh
- Now Deh
- Viyeh
