= Kalishom, Mazandaran =

Kalishom كليشم
- Village
- Location within Iran
- Coordinates: 36°37′56″N 50°44′32″E
- Country: Iran
- Province: Mazandaran
- County: Tonekabon
- Bakhsh: Khorramabad
- Rural District: Do Hezar

Population (2006)
  - Total: 73
- Time zone: UTC+3:30 (IRST)
  - Summer (DST): UTC+4:30 (IRDT)

Kalishom (Persian: كليشم, also romanized as Kalīshom) is a village in Do Hezar Rural District, Khorramabad District, Tonekabon County, Mazandaran Province, Iran. At the 2006 census, its population was 73, in 26 families.
