= Devil's Gap Battery =

Gun battery in Gibraltar

- Punta del Diablo
- Part of Fortifications of Gibraltar
- Upper Rock Nature Reserve, Gibraltar
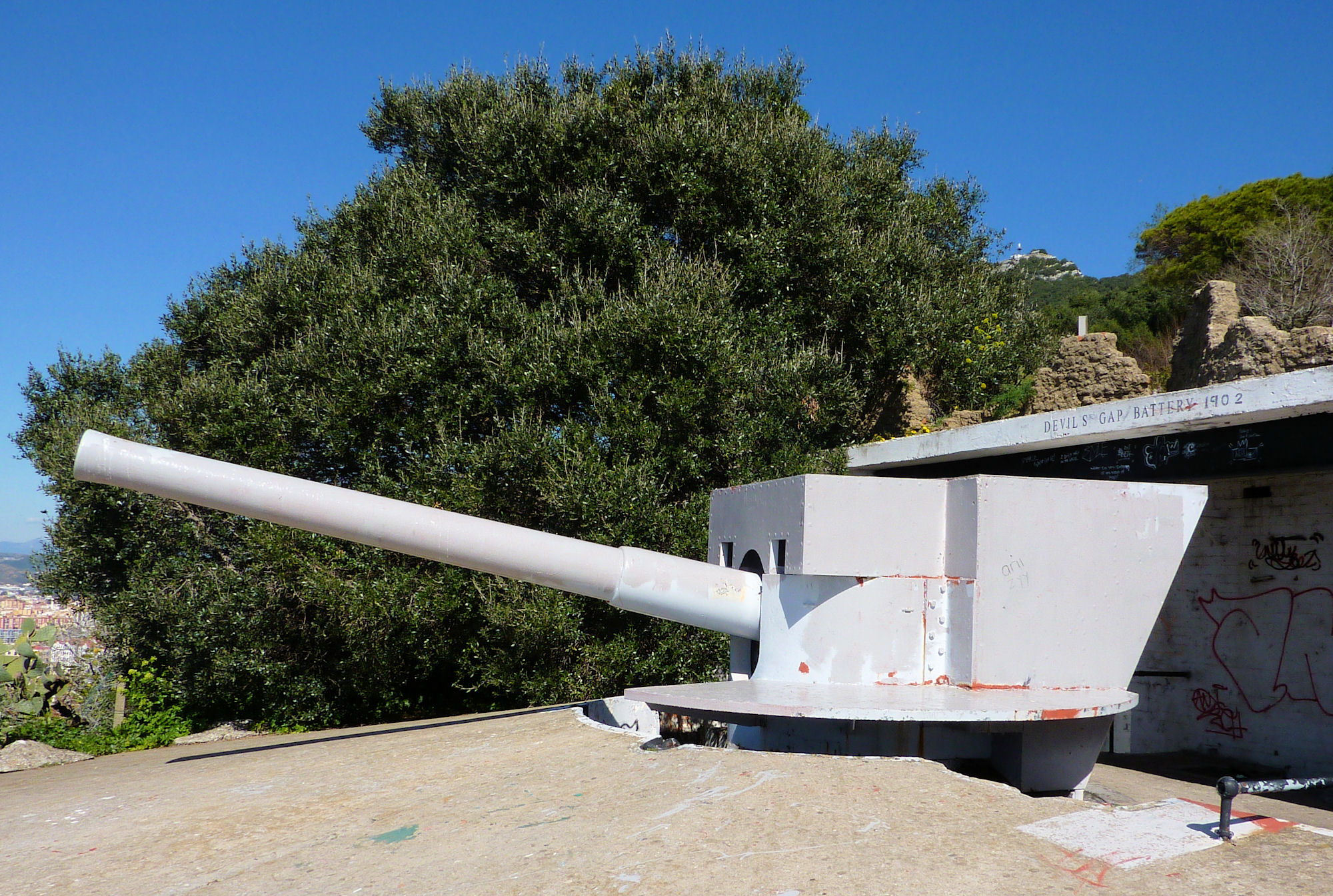
- View of the BL 6 inch Mk VII naval gun at Devil's Gap Battery.

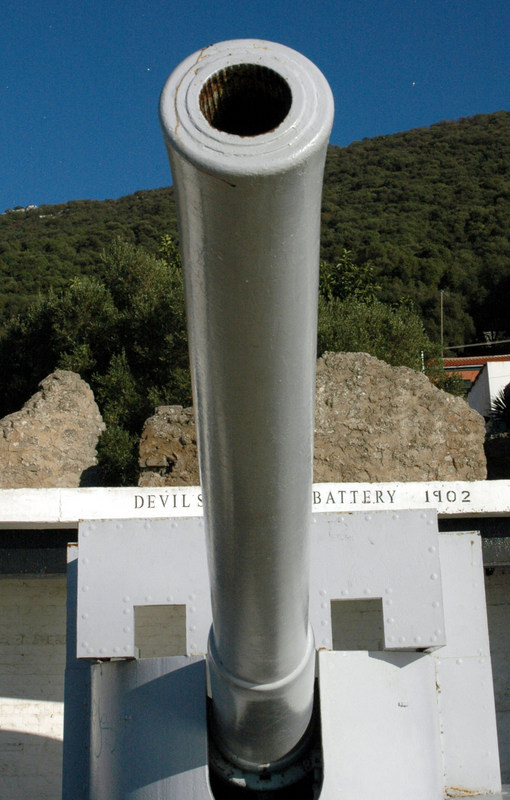
- Devil's Gap Battery (North gun)

Site information
- Type: Artillery battery
- Owner: Government of Gibraltar
- Controlled by: Gibraltar Heritage Trust
- Open to the public: Partially
- Condition: Mostly derelict

Location
- Location of Devil's Gap Battery within Gibraltar
- Coordinates: 36.136878°N 5.350445°W
- Height: 130 metres (430 ft) above sea level

Devil's Gap Battery is a coastal battery in the British Overseas Territory of Gibraltar, overlooking the Bay of Gibraltar near the westernmost limits of the Upper Rock Nature Reserve.

== History ==
Called by the Spanish, Punta del Diablo English: Devil's Point, Devils Gap Battery stands on the escarpment above the city looking out across the bay at a height of 130 metres (430 ft) above sea level. During the 1779-1783 Great Siege of Gibraltar it mounted at least one mortar, possibly more. In 1878 two RML 9 inch 12 ton guns were proposed and installed at the battery in June 1881, but later dismounted in 1900. In July 1896 work started on a new platform to the north of the battery for two QF 12 pounder 12 cwt naval Mark I guns which were ready on 31 August 1896.

In June 1900, it was proposed to mount two BL 6 inch Mk VII naval guns on central pivot Mark II mountings with a range of 5,500 metres (6,000 yd) capable of bearing on land batteries and on the bay. These were installed in 1902, with magazines and shelters added in October 1903.

In August 1917 one of the guns fired upon and sunk a German submarine travelling on the surface close to Algeciras, which was the only action seen by Gibraltar's coastal defences during World War I.

The guns were manned in 1936 during the Spanish Civil War while Campamento and La Línea de la Concepción were being bombarded by Spanish naval units.

During World War II the guns were the first to fire a bring to shot.

In 1954 the battery ceased its role of close defence examination but the 6-inch guns were retained and are still in position.

== Underground Facilities ==
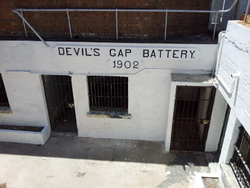

A small underground complex beneath the guns consisting of stores, magazines and shell hoists.

The first area inside the entrance contains two shell hoists which serves the south gun. Both are in fair condition relative to their age although all moving parts are now seized with rust. The hatch for transferring ammunition from the magazine can be seen in the lower right photograph. A corridor runs through the entire length of the complex. Further in, there are two more shell hoists serving the north gun, again these are in various states of decomposition. The main corridor extends through a door and proceeds slightly downhill to further rooms which are below a much older battery.

== Maintenance ==
The battery is maintained by a group of volunteers on behalf of the Gibraltar Heritage Trust. The battery is a Class A listed building as designated by the Government of Gibraltar's Gibraltar Heritage Trust Act of 1989.

== Gallery ==
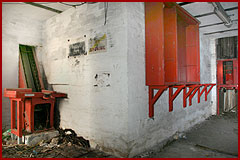

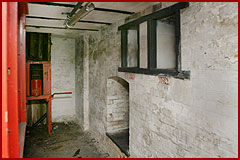

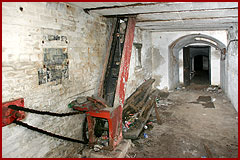

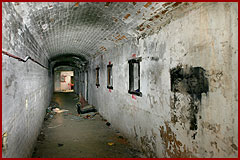

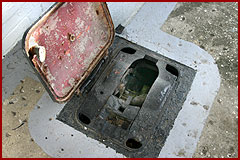

Photo animation
