= Jirandeh =

City in Gilan province, Iran

Jirandeh Persian: جیرنده Tati: جیریندیه
- City
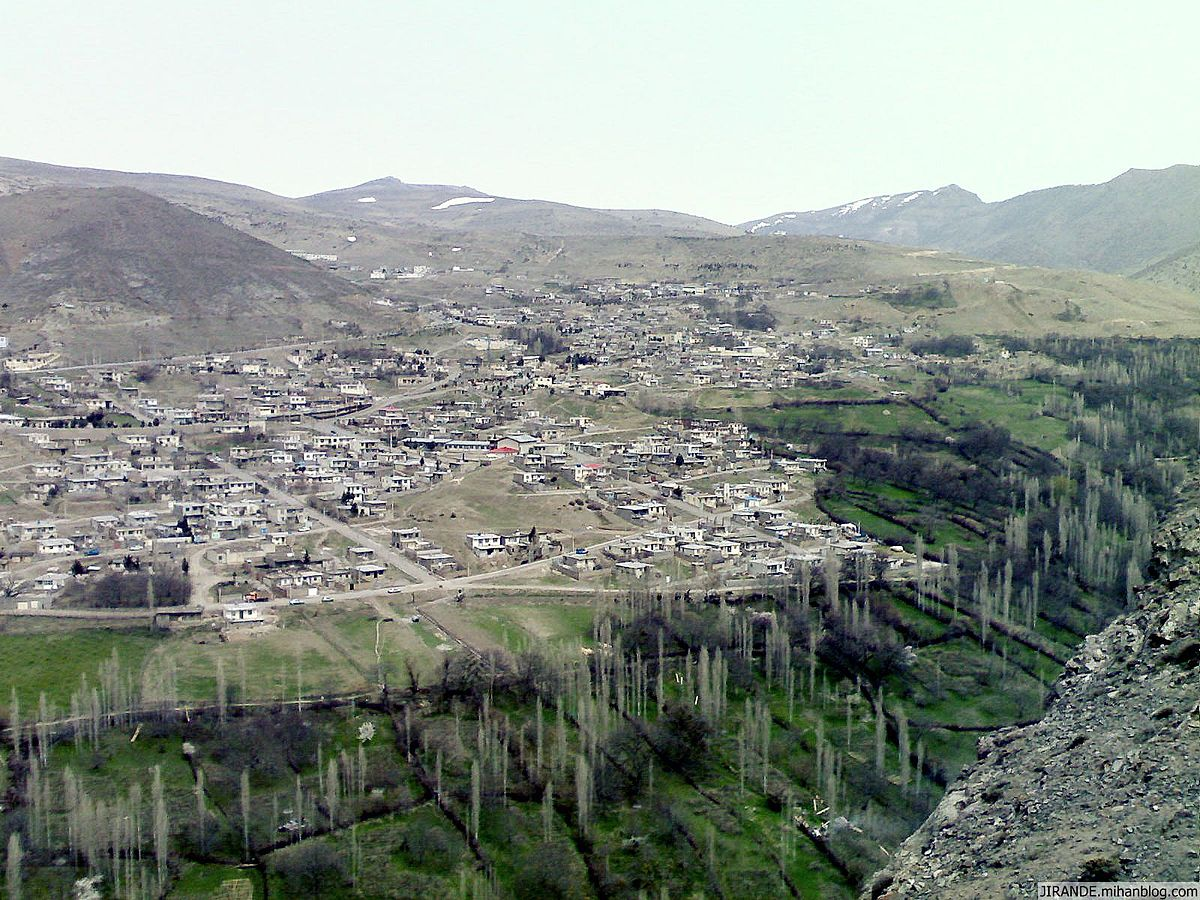
- The city of Jirandeh

- Location within Iran
- Coordinates: 36°42′09″N 49°47′40″E
- Country: Iran
- Province: Gilan
- County: Rudbar
- District: Amarlu
- Established as a city: 1993

Population (2016)
  - Total: 2,320
- Time zone: UTC+3:30 (IRST)

Jirandeh (Persian: جيرنده) (Note: Also romanized as Jīrandeh; also known as Chūrandeh, Dzharindy, Jārandeh, and Jarindeh; (Tati: جیریندیه), romanized as Jirindih) is a city in, and the capital of, Amarlu District in Rudbar County, Gilan province, Iran. It also serves as the administrative center for Jirandeh Rural District. The village of Jirandeh was converted to a city in 1993. It is north of the Shahrood river in the Alborz (Elburz) mountain range.

== Etymology ==
In the Tati language, Jirindih means "lower village": jirin ("lower") + dih ("village," "land").

== Demographics ==
=== Language and ethnicity ===
Jirandeh's residents are Tat people and they speak the Tati language.

=== Population ===
At the time of the 2006 National Census, the city's population was 2,616 in 754 households. The following census in 2011 counted 2,584 people in 819 households. The 2016 census measured the population of the city as 2,320 people in 791 households.

== Climate ==
Climate data for Jirandeh (2006-2010)
Month	Jan	Feb	Mar	Apr	May	Jun	Jul	Aug	Sep	Oct	Nov	Dec	Year
Daily mean °C (°F)	0.6 (33.1)	2.9 (37.2)	7.9 (46.2)	10.6 (51.1)	16.0 (60.8)	18.9 (66.0)	20.2 (68.4)	21.5 (70.7)	18.5 (65.3)	15.2 (59.4)	8.2 (46.8)	3.3 (37.9)	12.0 (53.6)
Mean daily minimum °C (°F)	−2.5 (27.5)	−0.2 (31.6)	4.0 (39.2)	6.0 (42.8)	11.1 (52.0)	14.1 (57.4)	15.9 (60.6)	16.7 (62.1)	13.8 (56.8)	10.9 (51.6)	4.8 (40.6)	0.3 (32.5)	7.9 (46.2)
Average precipitation mm (inches)	23.24 (0.91)	34.83 (1.37)	36.20 (1.43)	39.88 (1.57)	39.66 (1.56)	4.16 (0.16)	9.20 (0.36)	5.90 (0.23)	4.66 (0.18)	43.91 (1.73)	59.41 (2.34)	27.83 (1.10)	328.88 (12.94)
Average relative humidity (%)	61	64	53	60	57	60	61	54	59	58	57	61	59
Source: IRIMO

== Notable people ==
- Alireza Jahanbakhsh (born 1993), professional footballer
