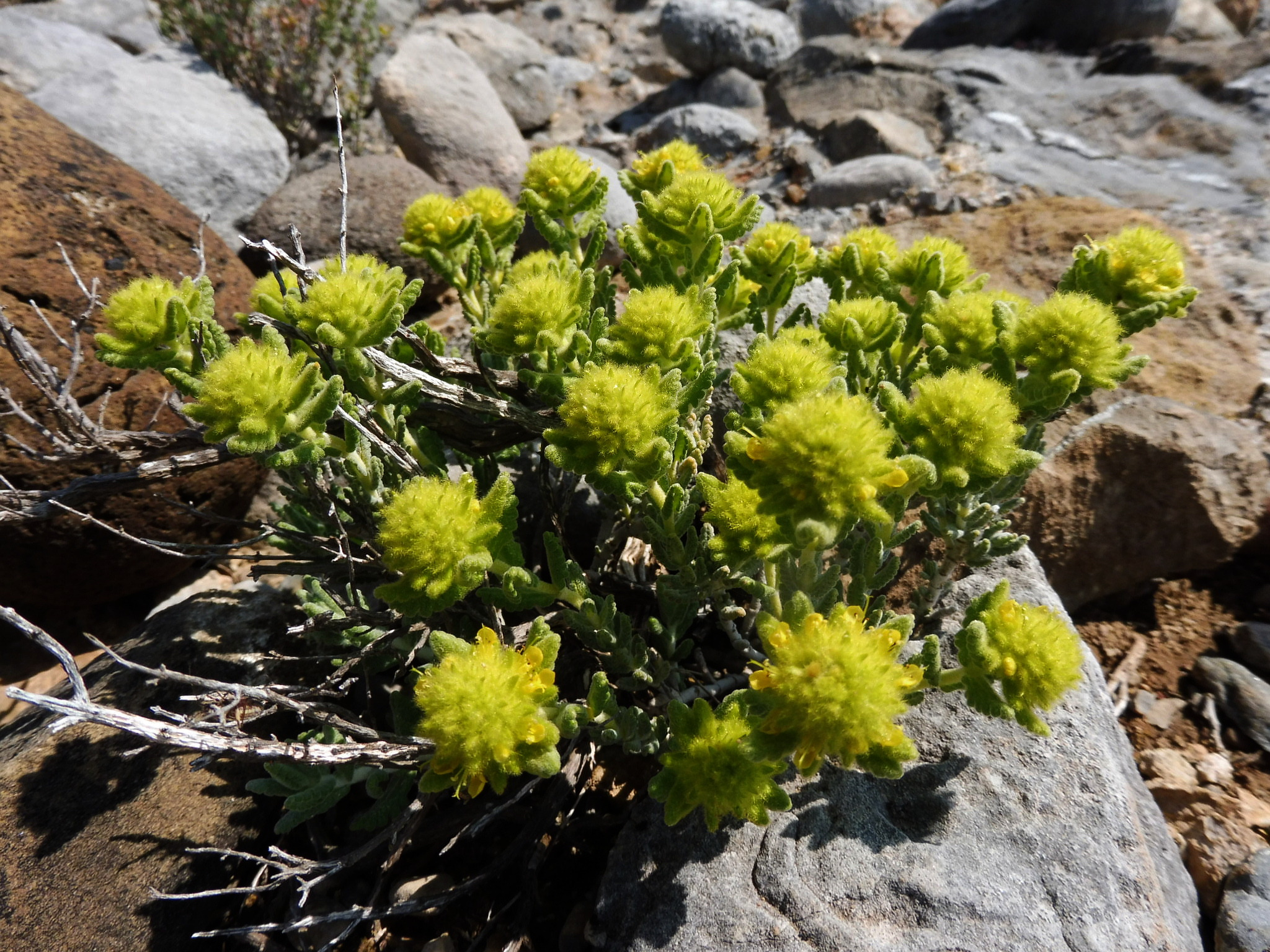
- Teucrium polium ssp. aureum

Scientific classification
- Kingdom: Plantae
- Clade: Tracheophytes
- Clade: Angiosperms
- Clade: Eudicots
- Clade: Asterids
- Order: Lamiales
- Family: Lamiaceae
- Genus: Teucrium
- Species: T. polium

Binomial name
- Teucrium polium L.

Synonyms
- Teucrium capitatum L.

= Teucrium polium =

Felty germander

Species of shrub

Teucrium polium, known popularly as felty germander, is a sub-shrub and herb native to the western Mediterranean region (Albania, North Macedonia, Spain, France, Algeria, Morocco, Tunisia). Its flowers are small and range from pink to white, and its leaves are used in cooking and for medicine.

== Traditional medicine ==
Teucrium polium is used for various supposed treatments in traditional medicine, although it has potential for causing liver toxicity.
