= Amarlu District =

District in Gilan province, Iran

Amarlu District Persian: بخش عمارلو
- District
- Location within Iran
- Coordinates: 36°41′N 49°49′E
- Country: Iran
- Province: Gilan
- County: Rudbar
- Capital: Jirandeh

Population (2016)
  - Total: 7,208
- Time zone: UTC+3:30 (IRST)

Amarlu District (Persian: بخش عمارلو) is in Rudbar County, Gilan province, Iran. Its capital is the city of Jirandeh.

== History ==
Amarlu has been one of the dominant Kurmanj tribes in Gilan Province. According to Rabino, the Rashvands formed another inhabitant of the region too. Rišvand formed part of the Bâbân tribe of Solaymâniya and were moved to Gilân by Shah 'Abbâs I. Later, they were chased out of most of their choice pasturelands by the 'Amârlu, who were moved to Gilân from northwestern Persia by Nâder Shah (Rabino, 1916–17, pp. 260–61; tr., pp. 304–6). The Rišvand now live mostly in Qazvin province. The 'Amârlu occupy some fifty villages between Menjil and Pirâkuh in southeastern Gilân. (See Fortescue, pp. 319–20; Mardukh Kordestâni, I, pp. 100–1; Afšâr Sistâni, pp. 132–34.)

The Amarlu tribe is primarily of Tat ethnic origin.

== Demographics ==
=== Language and ethnicity ===
Most people of Amarlu District are Tat and they speak Tati.

=== Population ===
At the time of the 2006 National Census, the district's population was 7,970 in 2,350 households. The following census in 2011 counted 6,960 people in 2,398 households. The 2016 census measured the population of the district as 7,208 inhabitants in 2,589 households.

=== Administrative divisions ===
Amarlu District Population
Administrative Divisions	2006	2011	2016
Jirandeh RD	2,826	2,372	2,656
Kalisham RD	2,528	2,004	2,232
Jirandeh (city)	2,616	2,584	2,320
Total	7,970	6,960	7,208
RD = Rural District

== Flora ==
Flora in the region includes:

- Juniperus polycarpus
- Pteropyrum aucheri
- Rosa canina
- Rhus coriaria
- Pistacia sp.
- Rhamnus pallasi
- Lilium ledebourii

and grasses and herbs such as:

- Astragalus marschallianus
- Galium gilanicum
- G. rotundifolium
- Teucrium polium
- Verbascum thapsus
- Artemisia herbaalba

== Notable people ==
- Manutchehr Salimi, politician
