= Jamalabad (disambiguation) =

Jamalabad is a fort in Karnataka, India.

Jamalabad or Jemalabad (Persian: جمال اباد also Romanized as Jamālābād) may also refer to places in Iran and Pakistan:

== Iran ==
=== Ardabil Province ===
- Jamalabad, Ardabil, a village in Meshgin Shahr County

=== Bushehr Province ===
- Jamalabad, Bushehr

=== Chaharmahal and Bakhtiari Province ===
- Jamalabad, Chaharmahal and Bakhtiari, a village in Kuhrang County

=== East Azerbaijan Province ===
- Jamalabad, Maragheh, a village in Maragheh County
- Jamalabad, Meyaneh, a village in Meyaneh County
- Jamalabad, Sarab, a village in Sarab County

=== Fars Province ===
- Jamalabad, Arsanjan, a village in Arsanjan County
- Jamalabad, Bavanat, a village in Bavanat County
- Jamalabad, Sarchehan, a village in Bavanat County
- Jamalabad, Lamerd, a village in Lamerd County
- Jamalabad, Marvdasht, a village in Marvdasht County
- Jamalabad, Shiraz, a village in Shiraz County

=== Gilan Province ===
- Jamalabad-e Hallaj, a village in Rudbar County
- Jamalabad-e Kuseh, a village in Rudbar County
- Jamalabad-e Nezamivand, a village in Rudbar County

=== Kerman Province ===
- Jamalabad, Anbarabad, a village in Anbarabad County
- Jamalabad, Baft, a village in Baft County
- Jamalabad, Mahan, a village in Kerman County
- Jamalabad, Rudbar-e Jonubi, a village in Rudbar-e Jonubi County

=== Khuzestan Province ===
- Jamalabad, Khuzestan

=== Markazi Province ===
- Jamalabad, Arak, Markazi Province
- Jamalabad, Mahallat, Markazi Province
- Jamalabad, Shazand, Markazi Province

=== Razavi Khorasan Province ===
- Jamalabad, Razavi Khorasan

=== Sistan and Baluchestan Province ===
- Jamalabad, Sistan and Baluchestan

=== Tehran Province ===
- Jamalabad, Tehran, a village in Pakdasht County, Tehran Province, Iran
- Jamalabad Rural District (Pakdasht County), an administrative subdivision of Pakdasht County, Tehran Province, Iran

=== West Azerbaijan Province ===
- Jamalabad, Poldasht, a village in Poldasht County
- Jamalabad, Salmas, a village in Salmas County
- Jamalabad, Urmia, a village in Urmia County

=== Yazd Province ===
- Jamalabad, Yazd, a village in Saduq County

== Pakistan ==
- Jamalabad Gojal, a village in Hunza District

== See also ==
- Jamilabad (disambiguation)
- Jamalpur (disambiguation)
