= Tork Neshin Lowshan =

Village in Gilan province, Iran

Tork Neshin Lowshan Persian: تركنشين لوشان
- Village
- Location within Iran
- Coordinates: 36°39′38″N 49°31′56″E
- Country: Iran
- Province: Gilan
- County: Rudbar
- District: Lowshan
- Rural District: Jamalabad

Population (2016)
  - Total: 59
- Time zone: UTC+3:30 (IRST)

Tork Neshin Lowshan (Persian: تركنشين لوشان) (Note: Also romanized as Tork Neshīn Lowshān; also known as Tork Lowshān) is a village in Jamalabad Rural District of Lowshan District in Rudbar County, Gilan province, Iran.

== Demographics ==
=== Population ===
At the time of the 2006 National Census, the village's population was 39 in nine households, when it was in Kalashtar Rural District of the Central District. The following census in 2011 counted 36 people in 12 households. The 2016 census measured the population of the village as 59 people in 20 households.

In 2024, 12 villages and the city of Lowshan were separated from the district in the formation of Lowshan District, and Tork Neshin Lowshan was transferred to Jamalabad Rural District created in the new district.
