= Namak Avaran =

Village in Gilan province, Iran

Namak Avaran Persian: نمک آوران
- Village
- Location within Iran
- Coordinates: 36°41′08″N 49°32′38″E
- Country: Iran
- Province: Gilan
- County: Rudbar
- District: Lowshan
- Rural District: Jamalabad

Population (2016)
  - Total: 90
- Time zone: UTC+3:30 (IRST)

Namak Avaran (Persian: نمک آوران) (Note: Also romanized as Namak Āvarān) is a village in Jamalabad Rural District of Lowshan District in Rudbar County, Gilan province, Iran.

== Demographics ==
=== Population ===
At the 1986 census, Namak Avaran had a population of 165 people in 28 households, of whom 67 people were educated. The village had tap water and an elementary school, but did not have electricity. The village's outside connection was through a gravel road. The village gained connection to the gas network in 2021.

At the time of the 2006 National Census, the village's population was below the reporting threshold, when it was in Kalashtar Rural District of the Central District. The village did not appear in the following census of 2011. The 2016 census measured the population of the village as 90 people in 31 households.

In 2024, 12 villages and the city of Lowshan were separated from the district in the formation of Lowshan District, and Namak Avaran was transferred to Jamalabad Rural District created in the new district.
