= Sari Cham =

Village in Gilan province, Iran

Sari Cham Persian: ساري چم
- Village
- Country: Iran
- Province: Gilan
- County: Rudbar
- District: Lowshan
- Rural District: Pachenar

Population (2016)
  - Total: 33
- Time zone: UTC+3:30 (IRST)

Sari Cham (Persian: ساری چم) (Note: Also romanized as Sārī Cham) is a village in Pachenar Rural District of Lowshan District in Rudbar County, Gilan province, Iran. The village was a center of Moroccan locust colonies.

== Demographics ==
=== Population ===
The village did not appear in the 2006 and 2011 National Censuses, when it was in Kalashtar Rural District of the Central District. The 2016 census measured the population of the village as 33 people in 10 households.

In 2024, 12 villages and the city of Lowshan were separated from the district in the formation of Lowshan District, and Sari Cham was transferred to Pachenar Rural District created in the new district.
