= Pa Chenar, Gilan =

Village in Gilan province, Iran

Pa Chenar Persian: پاچنار
- Village
- Location within Iran
- Coordinates: 36°36′37″N 49°32′12″E
- Country: Iran
- Province: Gilan
- County: Rudbar
- District: Lowshan
- Rural District: Pachenar

Population (2016)
  - Total: 410
- Time zone: UTC+3:30 (IRST)

Pa Chenar (Persian: پاچنار) (Note: Also romanized Pā Chenār; also known as Pāchinār, Paichmar, Pāychenār, and Paychinar) is a village in, and the capital of, Pachenar Rural District in Lowshan District of Rudbar County, Gilan province, Iran.

== Demographics ==
=== Population ===
At the time of the 2006 National Census, the village's population was 370 in 93 households, when it was in Kalashtar Rural District of the Central District. The following census in 2011 counted 336 people in 102 households. The 2016 census measured the population of the village as 410 people in 133 households.

In 2024, 12 villages and the city of Lowshan were separated from the district in the formation of Lowshan District, and Pa Chenar was transferred to Pachenar Rural District created in the new district.
