= Jamalabad-e Nezamivand =

Village in Gilan province, Iran

Jamalabad-e Nezamivand Persian: جمال آباد نظامی وند
- Village
- Location within Iran
- Coordinates: 36°39′18″N 49°27′50″E
- Country: Iran
- Province: Gilan
- County: Rudbar
- District: Lowshan
- Rural District: Jamalabad

Population (2016)
  - Total: 447
- Time zone: UTC+3:30 (IRST)

Jamalabad-e Nezamivand (Persian: جمال آباد نظامی وند) (Note: Also romanized as Jamālābād Nez̧āmīvand and Jamālābād-e Nezāmīvand; also known as Jamālābād) is a village in Jamalabad Rural District of Lowshan District in Rudbar County, Gilan province, Iran.

== Demographics ==
=== Population ===
At the time of the 2006 National Census, the village's population was 376 in 87 households, when it was in Kalashtar Rural District of the Central District. The following census in 2011 counted 457 people in 125 households. The 2016 census measured the population of the village as 447 people in 131 households.

In 2024, 12 villages and the city of Lowshan were separated from the district in the formation of Lowshan District, and Jamalabad-e Nezamivand was transferred to Jamalabad Rural District created in the new district.
