= Pachenar =

Pachenar or Pa Chenar (Persian: پاچنار) may refer to:

- Pa Chenar, Gilan
- Pachenar, Kerman
- Pachenar, Khuzestan
