= Jamalabad-e Hallaj =

Village in Gilan province, Iran

Jamalabad-e Hallaj Persian: جمال آباد حلاج
- Village
- Location within Iran
- Coordinates: 36°40′10″N 49°26′43″E
- Country: Iran
- Province: Gilan
- County: Rudbar
- District: Lowshan
- Rural District: Jamalabad

Population (2016)
  - Total: 246
- Time zone: UTC+3:30 (IRST)

Jamalabad-e Hallaj (Persian: جمال آباد حلاج) (Note: Also romanized as Jamālābād-e Ḩallāj) is a village in Jamalabad Rural District of Lowshan District in Rudbar County, Gilan province, Iran.

== Demographics ==
=== Population ===
At the time of the 2006 National Census, the village's population was 245 in 57 households, when it was in Kalashtar Rural District of the Central District. The following census in 2011 counted 238 people in 65 households. The 2016 census measured the population of the village as 246 people in 76 households.

In 2024, 12 villages and the city of Lowshan were separated from the district in the formation of Lowshan District, and Jamalabad-e Hallaj was transferred to Jamalabad Rural District created in the new district.
