= Jamalabad Rural District (Rudbar County) =

Rural district in Gilan province, Iran

Jamalabad Rural District Persian: دهستان جمال‌آباد
- Rural District
- Location within Iran
- Coordinates: 36°40′N 49°27′E
- Country: Iran
- Province: Gilan
- County: Rudbar
- District: Lowshan
- Established: 2024
- Capital: Jamalabad-e Kuseh
- Time zone: UTC+3:30 (IRST)

Jamalabad Rural District (Persian: دهستان جمال‌آباد) is in Lowshan District of Rudbar County, Gilan province, Iran. Its capital is the village of Jamalabad-e Kuseh, whose population at the time of the 2016 National Census was 440 people in 148 households.

== History ==
In 2024, 12 villages and the city of Lowshan were separated from the Central District in the formation of Lowshan District, and Jamalabad Rural District was created in the new district.

== Other villages in the rural district ==
- Jamalabad-e Hallaj
- Jamalabad-e Nezamivand
- Namak Avaran
- Tork Neshin Lowshan
