= Kalashtar, Iran =

Village in Gilan province, Iran

Kalashtar Persian: كلشتر
- Village, Neighborhood
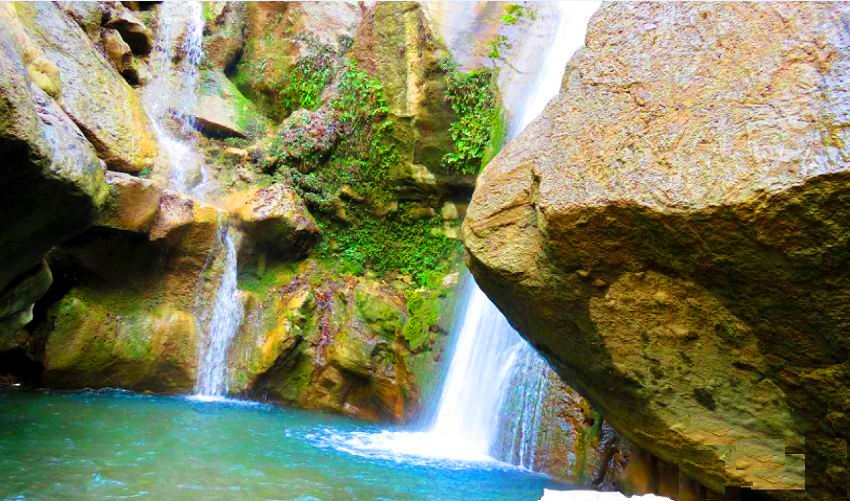
- Kaleshtar Waterfall

- Location within Iran
- Coordinates: 36°47′19″N 49°25′18″E
- Country: Iran
- Province: Gilan
- County: Rudbar
- District: Central
- Rural District: Kalashtar

Population (2016)
  - Total: 32
- Time zone: UTC+3:30 (IRST)

Kalashtar (Persian: كلشتر) (Note: Also romanized as Kaleshtar, Keleshtar, and Kolashtar; also known as Kalishtar) is a suburb of Rudbar city, and a village in Kalashtar Rural District of the Central District in Rudbar County, Gilan province, Iran. It was the former seat of the rural district. The capital was transferred to the village of Jamalabad-e Kuseh in 1994, and again transferred to the village of Aliabad in 2024.

== Environment ==
Kalashtar is 3 km (1.9 mi) away from the city center of Rudbar, at the foot of the Western Alborz Mountains, at an altitude of 550 m (1,800 ft) above sea level, overlooking the Rudbar. Due to the Mediterranean climate, olive groves have developed well in Kalashtar, making olive the main product of the village.

A waterfall, more than high is one of the village's tourist attractions. Water Springs such as Cheshmeh Bar (Gilaki: Chimeh Var (چیمه وار)), the dense and pristine forests as well as Aseman Sara Mountain and plains with tall, green grass at an altitude of 1,900 m (6,200 ft) above sea level are other attractions of Kolshtar.

== Demographics ==
=== Population ===
Klashtar was formerly in Rahmatabad Rural District of the county. According to the 1976 census, it had both tap water and power connection. It also had elementary and middle school.

According to the 1986 census, Kaleshtar also had medical clinic, and access to public transportation.

At the time of the 2006 National Census, the village's population was 1,272 in 409 households. The following census in 2011 counted 1,314 people in 438 households.

The 2016 census measured the population of the village as 32 people in 11 households, as most of the village was incorporated to Rudbar's urban area.

Kalashtar Population history
Year	Pop.	±%
1966	1,901	—
1976	2,214	+16.5%
1986	2,715	+22.6%
2006	1,272	−53.1%
2011	1,314	+3.3%
2016	32	−97.6%
