= Dizkuh (disambiguation) =

Dizkuh may refer to:

- Diz Kuh, Gilan, Iran
- Dizkuh or Shahdiz, fortress near Isfahan, Iran
- Qaleh-ye Dezh Kuh, village in Kohgiluyeh and Boyer-Ahmad Province, Iran
