= Pachenar Rural District =

Rural district in Gilan province, Iran

Pachenar Rural District Persian: دهستان پاچنار
- Rural District
- Location within Iran
- Coordinates: 36°37′N 49°32′E
- Country: Iran
- Province: Gilan
- County: Rudbar
- District: Lowshan
- Established: 2024
- Capital: Pa Chenar
- Time zone: UTC+3:30 (IRST)

Pachenar Rural District (Persian: دهستان پاچنار) is in Lowshan District of Rudbar County, Gilan province, Iran. Its capital is the village of Pa Chenar, whose population at the time of the 2016 National Census was 410 people in 133 households.

== History ==
In 2024, 12 villages and the city of Lowshan were separated from the Central District in the formation of Lowshan District, and Pachenar Rural District was created in the new district.

== Other villages in the rural district ==
Besides the village of Pa Chenar, the rural district consists of three other settlements:

- Sari Cham
