= Tala Bar =

Village in Gilan province, Iran

Tala Bar Persian: طلابر
- Village
- Location within Iran
- Coordinates: 36°49′17″N 49°26′35″E
- Country: Iran
- Province: Gilan
- County: Rudbar
- District: Central
- Rural District: Kalashtar

Population (2016)
  - Total: 89
- Time zone: UTC+3:30 (IRST)

Tala Bar (Persian: طلابر) (Note: Also romanized as Ţalā Bar; also known as Tīlābar) is a village in Kalashtar Rural District of the Central District in Rudbar County, Gilan province, Iran.

It is a mountainous village with a temperate climate, 6 km (3.7 mi) northeast of Rudbar and east of Sefidrud. Tala Bar's agricultural products are olive, grain, and Dairy product, the water source of the village used to come from Water Spring.

== Demographics ==
People of Talabar are shia muslim and speak Persian and Gilaki languages.

=== Population ===
Talabar Population history
Year	Pop.	±%
1949	150	—
1956	182	+21.3%
1966	227	+24.7%
1976	240	+5.7%
1986	261	+8.7%
2006	58	−77.8%
2011	43	−25.9%
2016	89	+107.0%

At the 1976 census, the village had a population of 240 people in 41 households, the village had school. At the 1986 census, Talabar had 261 people in 54 households. It had access to tap water and electricity.

At the time of the 2006 National Census, the village's population was 58 in 18 households. The following census in 2011 counted 43 people in 16 households. The 2016 census measured the population of the village as 89 people in 37 households.
