= Kara Rud =

Kara Rud (Persian: كرارود) may refer to:

- Kara Rud, Ardabil
- Kara Rud, Gilan
