= Aliabad, Rudbar =

Village in Gilan province, Iran

Aliabad Persian: علی آباد، علی آباد بالا
- Village
- Location within Iran
- Coordinates: 36°45′32″N 49°20′00″E
- Country: Iran
- Province: Gilan
- County: Rudbar
- District: Central
- Rural District: Kalashtar

Population (2016)
  - Total: 1,605
- Time zone: UTC+3:30 (IRST)

Aliabad (Persian: علی آباد) (Note: Also romanized as ‘Alīābād; also known as ‘Alīābād-e Bālā) is a village in, and the capital of, Kalashtar Rural District in the Central District of Rudbar County, Gilan province, Iran. The previous capital of the rural district was the village of Jamalabad-e Kuseh, and prior to that time, its capital was the village of Kalashtar.

== Demographics ==
=== Population ===
At the time of the 2006 National Census, the village's population was 1,500 in 345 households. The following census in 2011 counted 1,545 people in 400 households. The 2016 census measured the population of the village as 1,605 people in 399 households. It was the most populous village in its rural district.

== Notable people ==
Iranian General Ali Abdollahi is from Aliabad.
