= Razkand =

Village in Gilan province, Iran

Razkand Persian: رزكند
- Village
- Location within Iran
- Coordinates: 36.823°N 49.434°E
- Country: Iran
- Province: Gilan
- County: Rudbar
- District: Central
- Rural District: Kalashtar

Population (2016)
  - Total: Below reporting threshold
- Time zone: UTC+3:30 (IRST)

Razkand (Persian: رزكند) (Note: Also known as Razkand-e Ţalābar) is a village in Kalashtar Rural District of the Central District in Rudbar County, Gilan province, Iran. It is a suburb of Rudbar city.

== Demographics ==
=== Population ===
At the time of the 2006 National Census, the village's population was 36 in 10 households. The following censuses in 2011 and 2016 counted a population below the reporting threshold.
