= Yeylaqi =

Yeylaqi (Persian: ييلاقي) may refer to:

- Yeylaqi-ye Darestan
- Yeylaqi-ye Lakeh
