= Reshterud =

Village in Gilan province, Iran

Reshterud Persian: رشترود
- Village
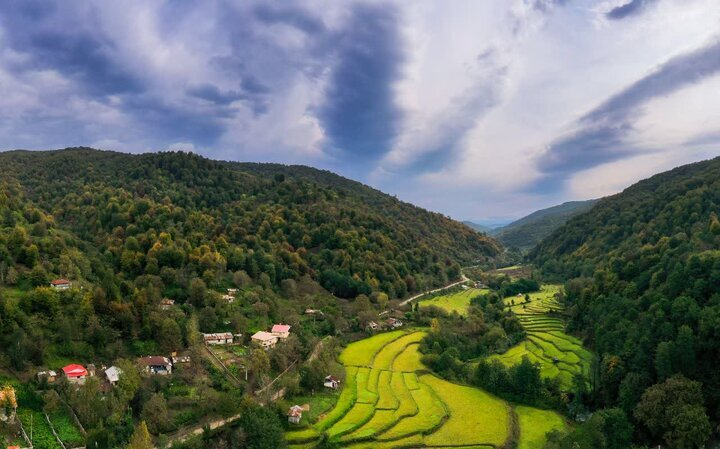
- Aerial view of Reshteh Rud

- Location within Iran
- Coordinates: 37°00′11″N 49°27′51″E
- Country: Iran
- Province: Gilan
- County: Rudbar
- District: Central
- Rural District: Rostamabad-e Shomali

Population (2016)
  - Total: 236
- Time zone: UTC+3:30 (IRST)

Reshterud (Persian: رشترود) (Note: Also romanized as Reshterūd; also known as Reshteh Rūd and Rasht Rūd) is a village in Rostamabad-e Shomali Rural District of the Central District in Rudbar County, Gilan province, Iran.

== Geography ==
Rehterud is a mountainous village located by the Siahrud river. It is approximately 44 km (27 mi) north of the county seat, Rudbar. The village has a temperate climate and has been a Malaria hotspot.

== Demographics ==
People of Reshterud speak the Tati language and their religion is Shia Islam. People of the village has been active in Rice cultivation, scarf weaving, and Animal husbandry. Reshterud's agricultural products include rice and dairy.

=== Population ===
Reshterud Population history
| Year | Pop. | ±% |
|---|---|---|
| 1949 | 501 | — |
| 1956 | 522 | +4.2% |
| 1966 | 693 | +32.8% |
| 1976 | 655 | −5.5% |
| 1986 | 1,064 | +62.4% |
| 2006 | 470 | −55.8% |
| 2011 | 306 | −34.9% |
| 2016 | 236 | −22.9% |

At the 1966 census, Rehterud had 693 people in 117 households, as well as a total of 5,695 Livestock animals. In 1976, its population was 655 people in 138 households, and had mosque and elementary school.

In the 1986 census, the village had 1,064 people in 176 households, of which 374 were educated and 201 were employed. Total count of livestock was 408.

At the time of the 2006 National Census, the village's population was 470 in 132 households. The following census in 2011 counted 306 people in 95 households. The 2016 census measured the population of the village as 236 people in 80 households.
