= Dashtagan =

Village in Gilan province, Iran

Dashtagan Persian: دشتگان
- Village
- Location within Iran
- Coordinates: 36°49′49″N 49°26′37″E
- Country: Iran
- Province: Gilan
- County: Rudbar
- District: Central
- Rural District: Kalashtar

Population (2016)
  - Total: 113
- Time zone: UTC+3:30 (IRST)

Dashtagan (Persian: دشتگان) (Note: Also romanized as Dashtagān) is a village in Kalashtar Rural District of the Central District in Rudbar County, Gilan province, Iran.

== Demographics ==
=== Population ===
At the time of the 2006 National Census, the village's population was 109 in 35 households. The following census in 2011 counted 113 people in 35 households. The 2016 census measured the population of the village as 113 people in 44 households.
