= Jamilabad =

Jamilabad (Persian: جميل اباد) may refer to:

- Jamilabad, East Azerbaijan
- Jamilabad, Hamadan
- Jamilabad, Kerman

== See also ==
- Jamalabad (disambiguation)
