= Kuleh Kesh =

Village in Gilan province, Iran

Kuleh Kesh Persian: كوله كش
- Village
- Location within Iran
- Coordinates: 36°57′11″N 49°31′58″E
- Country: Iran
- Province: Gilan
- County: Rudbar
- District: Central
- Rural District: Rostamabad-e Shomali

Population (2016)
  - Total: 174
- Time zone: UTC+3:30 (IRST)

Kuleh Kesh (Persian: كوله كش) (Note: Also romanized as Kūleh Kesh; also known as Kūl Kesh) is a village in Rostamabad-e Shomali Rural District of the Central District in Rudbar County, Gilan province, Iran.

== Demographics ==
=== Population ===
At the time of the 2006 National Census, the village's population was 78 in 24 households. The following census in 2011 counted 91 people in 30 households. The 2016 census measured the population of the village as 174 people in 56 households.
