= Charman, Iran =

Charman Persian: چارمان
- Village
- Location within Iran
- Coordinates: 36°58′49″N 49°32′52″E
- Country: Iran
- Province: Gilan
- County: Rudbar
- District: Central
- Rural District: Rostamabad-e Shomali

Population (2016 Census)
  - Total: 56
- Time zone: UTC+3:30 (IRST)

Charman (Persian: چارمان, also Romanized as Chārmān) is a village in Rostamabad-e Shomali Rural District, in the Central District of Rudbar County, Gilan Province, Iran. At the 2016 census, its population was 56 people, in 18 households. Down from 63 people recorded at the 2011 census.

The village did not have natural gas until it gained connection to gas network in 2019.

One of the notable people of the village is Salim Karimi an artist known for its paintings.

Charman Population history
Year	Pop.	±%
1966	83	—
1976	146	+75.9%
1986	104	−28.8%
2011	63	−39.4%
2016	56	−11.1%
