= Qaleh Kol, Rudbar =

Qaleh Kol قلعه کل
- Village
- Interactive map of Qaleh Kol
- Coordinates: 37°1′18.948″N 49°36′10.3788″E
- Country: Iran
- Province: Gilan
- County: Rudbar
- Bakhsh: Central
- Rural District: North Rostamabad

Population (2016)
  - Total: 52
- Time zone: UTC+3:30 (IRST)

Qaleh Kol (Persian: قلعه کل, also Romanized as Qal'eh Kol) is a village in Rostamabad-e Shomali Rural District, in the Central District of Rudbar County, Gilan Province, Iran. At the 2016 census, its population was 52 people, in 21 households.
