= Yeylaqi-ye Dugaheh =

Village in Gilan province, Iran

Yeylaqi-ye Dugaheh Persian: ييلاقي دوگاهه
- Village
- Location within Iran
- Coordinates: 36°53′29″N 49°20′00″E
- Country: Iran
- Province: Gilan
- County: Rudbar
- District: Central
- Rural District: Rostamabad-e Jonubi

Population (2016)
  - Total: 83
- Time zone: UTC+3:30 (IRST)

Yeylaqi-ye Dugaheh (Persian: ييلاقي دوگاهه) is a village in Rostamabad-e Jonubi Rural District of the Central District in Rudbar County, Gilan province, Iran.

== Demographics ==
=== Population ===
The village did not appear in the 2006 and 2011 National Censuses. The 2016 census measured the population of the village as 83 people in 28 households.
