= Juben =

Village in Gilan province, Iran

Juben Persian: جوبن
- Village
- Location within Iran
- Coordinates: 36°52′19″N 49°29′11″E
- Country: Iran
- Province: Gilan
- County: Rudbar
- District: Central
- Rural District: Rostamabad-e Jonubi

Population (2016)
  - Total: 1,478
- Time zone: UTC+3:30 (IRST)

Juben (Persian: جوبن) (Note: Also romanized as Dzhuban, Jooban, Jowbon, Jūban, Jūben, and Jūbon; also known as Jūbīn) is a village in Rostamabad-e Jonubi Rural District of the Central District in Rudbar County, Gilan province, Iran.

== Demographics ==
=== Population ===
At the time of the 2006 National Census, the village's population was 1,673 in 490 households. The following census in 2011 counted 1,596 people in 520 households. The 2016 census measured the population of the village as 1,478 people in 517 households. It was the most populous village in its rural district.
