= Sefid Rud, Iran =

Village in Gilan province, Iran

Sefid Rud Persian: سفيدرود
- Village
- Location within Iran
- Coordinates: 36°45′53.096″N 49°23′19.223″E
- Country: Iran
- Province: Gilan
- County: Rudbar
- District: Central
- Rural District: Kalashtar

Population (2016)
  - Total: 470
- Time zone: UTC+3:30 (IRST)

Sefid Rud (Persian: سفيدرود) (Note: Also romanized as Sefīd Rūd) is a village in Kalashtar Rural District of the Central District in Rudbar County, Gilan province, Iran.

== Demographics ==
=== Population ===
At the time of the 2006 National Census, the village's population was 644 in 169 households. The following census in 2011 counted 600 people in 184 households. The 2016 census measured the population of the village as 470 people in 163 households.
