= Galivarz =

Village in Gilan province, Iran

Galivarz Persian: گليورز
- Village
- Location within Iran
- Coordinates: 36°50′03″N 49°27′14″E
- Country: Iran
- Province: Gilan
- County: Rudbar
- District: Central
- Rural District: Kalashtar

Population (2016)
  - Total: 87
- Time zone: UTC+3:30 (IRST)

Galivarz (Persian: گليورز) (Note: Also romanized as Galīvarz; also known as Galavarz, Galeh Varz, Galevarz, Gīlāvarz, Gilāwarz, Kalavarz, Kalooraz, Kalvarz, and Kulyavar) is a village in Kalashtar Rural District of the Central District in Rudbar County, Gilan province, Iran.

== Demographics ==
=== Population ===
At the time of the 2006 National Census, the village's population was 49 in 17 households. The following census in 2011 counted 71 people in 21 households. The 2016 census measured the population of the village as 87 people in 31 households.
