= Kohneh Van Sara =

Kohneh Van Sara كهنه وانسرا
- Village
- Interactive map of Kohneh Van Sara
- Coordinates: 36°58′16.18″N 49°32′30.09″E
- Country: Iran
- Province: Gilan
- County: Rudbar
- Bakhsh: Central
- Rural District: Rostamabad-e Shomali

Population (2006)
  - Total: 19
- Time zone: UTC+3:30 (IRST)

Kohneh Van Sara (Persian: كهنه وانسرا, also Romanized as Kohneh Vān Sarā) is a village in Rostamabad-e Shomali Rural District, in the Central District of Rudbar County, Gilan Province, Iran. At the 2016 census, its population was 13, in 5 families. Down from 19 in 2006.
