= Eskolak =

Village in Gilan province, Iran

Eskolak Persian: اسکلک
- Village
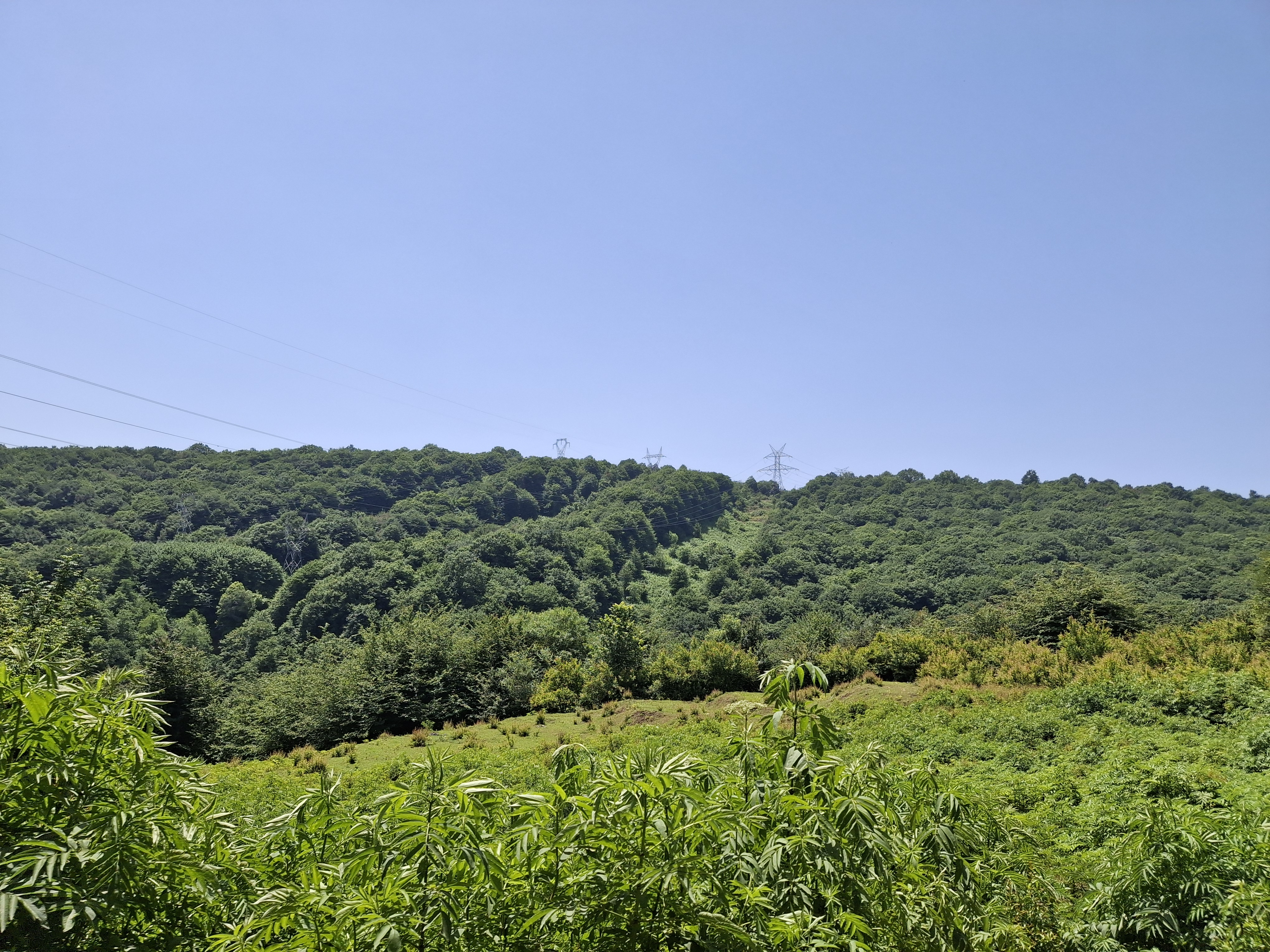
- Landscape in the village of Eskolak

- Location within Iran
- Coordinates: 37°00′20″N 49°34′49″E
- Country: Iran
- Province: Gilan
- County: Rudbar
- District: Central
- Rural District: Rostamabad-e Shomali

Population (2016)
  - Total: 707
- Time zone: UTC+3:30 (IRST)

Eskolak (Persian: اسکلک,) (Note: Also romanized as Eskolak and Oskalak; also known as Eshkalak, Eskowlak, Eskulak, and Uskalak) is a village in, and the capital of, Rostamabad-e Shomali Rural District in the Central District of Rudbar County, Gilan province, Iran.

== Demographics ==
=== Population ===
At the time of the 2006 National Census, the village's population was 839 in 227 households. The following census in 2011 counted 788 people in 233 households. The 2016 census measured the population of the village as 707 people in 225 households. It was the most populous village in its rural district.
