= Yeylaqi-ye Darestan =

Village in Gilan province, Iran

Yeylaqi-ye Darestan Persian: ییلاقی دارستان
- Village
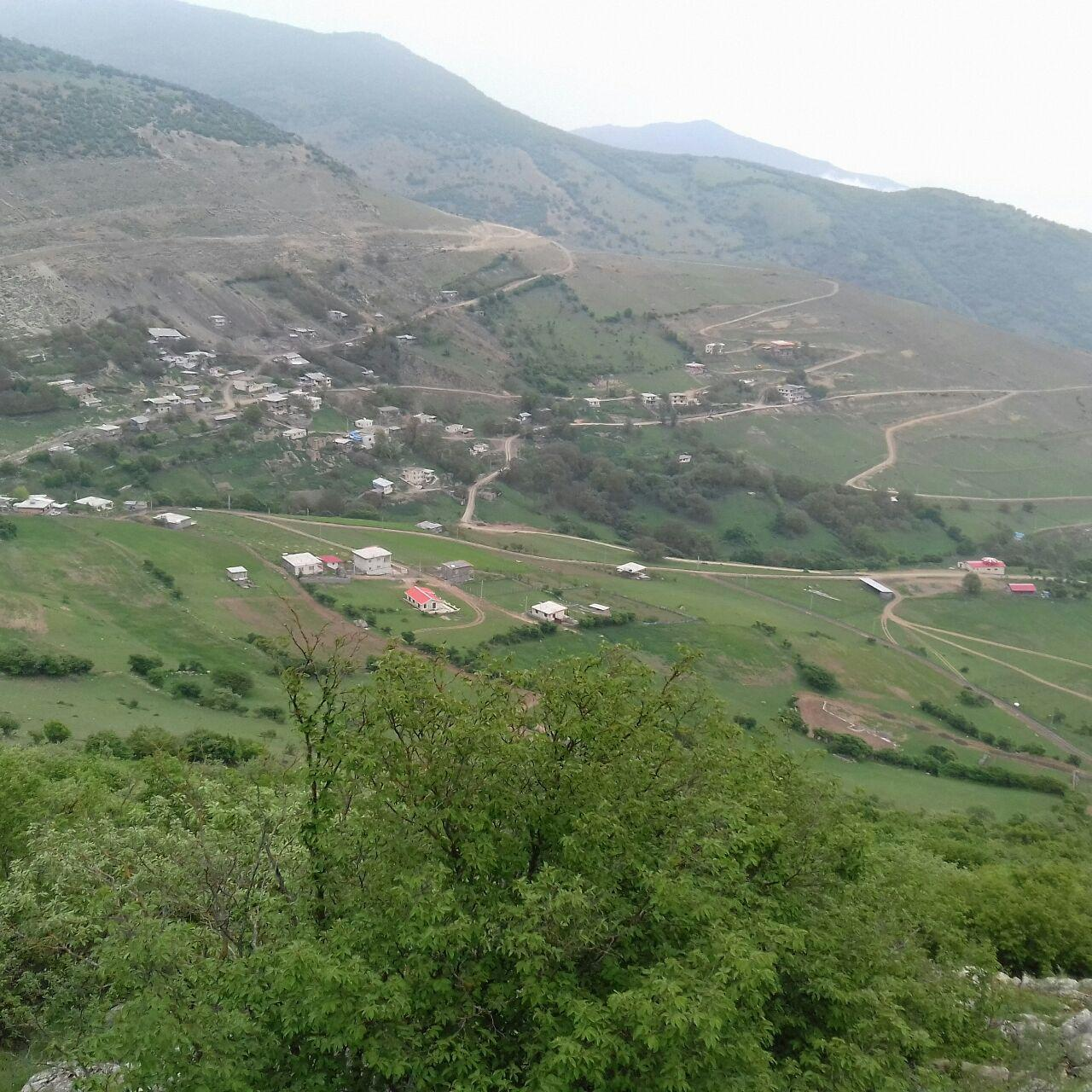
- The village of Yeylaqi-ye Darestan

- Location within Iran
- Coordinates: 36°52′51″N 49°23′26″E
- Country: Iran
- Province: Gilan
- County: Rudbar
- District: Central
- Rural District: Rostamabad-e Jonubi

Population (2016)
  - Total: 177
- Time zone: UTC+3:30 (IRST)

Yeylaqi-ye Darestan (Persian: ییلاقی دارستان) (Note: Also romanized as Yeylāqī-ye Dārestān; also known as Darastan, Dārestān, and Yeylāq-e Darestān) is a village in Rostamabad-e Jonubi Rural District of the Central District in Rudbar County, Gilan province, Iran.

Yeylaqi-ye Darestan is a mountainous village with road access to the city of Rudbar. It used to be prosperous village, with its people engaged in farming and animal husbandry. The village has turned into a tourist area and a favorite destination during summer. Several ancient artifacts have been excavated here.

== Demographics ==
=== Population ===
At the time of the 2006 National Census, the village's population was 15 in nine households. The following census in 2011 counted 103 people in 37 households. The 2016 census measured the population of the village as 177 people in 56 households.
