= Harkian, Gilan =

Village in Gilan province, Iran

Harkian Persian: هركيان
- Village
- Location within Iran
- Coordinates: 36°59′36″N 49°32′30″E
- Country: Iran
- Province: Gilan
- County: Rudbar
- District: Central
- Rural District: Rostamabad-e Shomali

Population (2016)
  - Total: 233
- Time zone: UTC+3:30 (IRST)

Harkian (Persian: هركيان) (Note: Also romanized as Harkīān) is a village in Rostamabad-e Shomali Rural District of the Central District in Rudbar County, Gilan province, Iran.

== Demographics ==
=== Population ===
At the time of the 2006 National Census, the village's population was 173 in 52 households. The following census in 2011 counted 183 people in 60 households. The 2016 census measured the population of the village as 233 people in 81 households.
