= Hezar Marz =

Hezar Marz هزار مرز
- Village
- Country: Iran
- Province: Gilan
- County: Rudbar
- Bakhsh: Central
- Rural District: North Rostamabad

Population (2016)
  - Total: 0
- Time zone: UTC+3:30 (IRST)

Hezar Marz (Persian: هزار مرز romanized Hezār Marz, also known as Hezar Hezar) is an unpopulated village and a forested mountainous area in Rostamabad-e Shomali Rural District, in the Central District of Rudbar County, Gilan Province, Iran. The region's forests have been subject to wood smuggling.

== Demographics ==
According to the 1966 census, Hezar Marz was in Rostamabad rural district of Rudbar County. Its population at that time was 22 people in 5 households, and there ware no facilities or public infrastructure in the village.

It was later mentioned in 1986 census, when it was an unpopulated village with no agricultural activity.

At the 2016 census, there were no household recorded in the settlement.

Hezar Marz Population history
Year	Pop.	±%
1966	22	—
1986	0	−100.0%
2016	0	0.00%
