= Chubtarash Mahalleh =

Chubtarash Mahalleh چوب تراش محله
- Village
- Location within Iran
- Coordinates: 37°01′10″N 49°34′18″E
- Country: Iran
- Province: Gilan
- County: Rudbar
- Bakhsh: Central
- Rural District: Rostamabad-e Shomali

Population (2006)
  - Total: 79
- Time zone: UTC+3:30 (IRST)

Chubtarash Mahalleh (Persian: چوب تراش محله, also Romanized as Chūbtarāsh Maḩalleh; also known as Chūbtāsh Maḩalleh) is a village in Rostamabad-e Shomali Rural District, in the Central District of Rudbar County, Gilan Province, Iran. At the 2006 census, its population was 38, in 12 families. Decreased from 79 people in 2006.
