= Mazian, Gilan =

Mazian مازيان
- Village
- Location within Iran
- Coordinates: 36°57′54″N 49°32′18″E
- Country: Iran
- Province: Gilan
- County: Rudbar
- Bakhsh: Central
- Rural District: Rostamabad-e Shomali

Population (2016)
  - Total: 55
- Time zone: UTC+3:30 (IRST)

Mazian (Persian: مازيان, also Romanized as Māẕīān) is a village in Rostamabad-e Shomali Rural District, in the Central District of Rudbar County, Gilan Province, Iran. At the 2016 census, its population was 55, in 21 families.
