= Jamalabad-e Kuseh =

Village in Gilan province, Iran

Jamalabad-e Kuseh Persian: جمال‌آباد کوسه
- Village
- Location within Iran
- Coordinates: 36°39′48″N 49°27′29″E
- Country: Iran
- Province: Gilan
- County: Rudbar
- District: Lowshan
- Rural District: Jamalabad

Population (2016)
  - Total: 440
- Time zone: UTC+3:30 (IRST)

Jamalabad-e Kuseh (Persian: جمال‌آباد کوسه) (Note: Also romanized as Jamālābād-e Kūseh) is a village in, and the capital of, Jamalabad Rural District in Lowshan District of Rudbar County, Gilan province, Iran. It served as the capital of Kalashtar Rural District after the capital had been transferred from the village of Kalashtar.

== Demographics ==
=== Population ===
At the time of the 2006 National Census, the village's population was 519 in 135 households, when it was in Kalashtar Rural District of the Central District. The following census in 2011 counted 442 people in 112 households. The 2016 census measured the population of the village as 440 people in 148 households.

In 2024, 12 villages and the city of Lowshan were separated from the district in the formation of Lowshan District, and Jamalabad-e Kuseh was transferred to Jamalabad Rural District created in the new district.
