= Ganjeh, Gilan =

Village in Gilan province, Iran

Ganjeh Persian: گنجه
- Village
- Location within Iran
- Coordinates: 36°51′15″N 49°28′11″E
- Country: Iran
- Province: Gilan
- County: Rudbar
- District: Central
- Rural District: Rostamabad-e Jonubi

Population (2016)
  - Total: 1,147
- Time zone: UTC+3:30 (IRST)

Ganjeh (Persian: گنجه) (Note: Also known as Gandzha, Gunja, and Gūnjeh) is a village in Rostamabad-e Jonubi Rural District of the Central District in Rudbar County, Gilan province, Iran.

== Demographics ==
=== Population ===
At the time of the 2006 National Census, the village's population was 1,196 in 326 households. The following census in 2011 counted 1,243 people in 369 households. The 2016 census measured the population of the village as 1,147 people in 399 households.
