= Tuseh Rud =

Village in Gilan province, Iran

Tuseh Rud Persian: توسه رود
- Village
- Location within Iran
- Coordinates: 37°02′02″N 49°34′51″E
- Country: Iran
- Province: Gilan
- County: Rudbar
- District: Central
- Rural District: Rostamabad-e Shomali

Population (2016)
  - Total: 107
- Time zone: UTC+3:30 (IRST)

Tuseh Rud (Persian: توسه رود) (Note: Also romanized as Tūseh Rūd; also known as Tūsīrū) is a village in Rostamabad-e Shomali Rural District of the Central District in Rudbar County, Gilan province, Iran.

== Demographics ==
=== Population ===
At the time of the 2006 National Census, the village's population was 97 in 23 households. The following census in 2011 counted 114 people in 36 households. The 2016 census measured the population of the village as 107 people in 39 households.
