= Khulak =

Khulak خولک
- Village
- Location within Iran
- Coordinates: 37°00′00″N 49°29′28″E
- Country: Iran
- Province: Gilan
- County: Rudbar
- Bakhsh: Central
- Rural District: Rostamabad-e Shomali

Population (2006)
  - Total: 108
- Time zone: UTC+3:30 (IRST)

Khulak (Persian: خولک, also Romanized as Khūlak) is a village in Rostamabad-e Shomali Rural District, in the Central District of Rudbar County, Gilan Province, Iran. At the 2016 census, its population was 45, in 19 families. Decreased from 108 people in 2006.
