= Siah Rud Poshteh =

Village in Gilan province, Iran

Siah Rud Poshteh Persian: سياهرودپشته
- Village
- Location within Iran
- Coordinates: 36°59′56″N 49°33′25″E
- Country: Iran
- Province: Gilan
- County: Rudbar
- District: Central
- Rural District: Rostamabad-e Shomali

Population (2016)
  - Total: 174
- Time zone: UTC+3:30 (IRST)

Siah Rud Poshteh (Persian: سياهرودپشته) (Note: Also romanized as Sīāh Rūd Poshteh; also known as Sīāh Rūd) is a village in Rostamabad-e Shomali Rural District of the Central District in Rudbar County, Gilan province, Iran.

== Demographics ==
=== Population ===
At the time of the 2006 National Census, the village's population was 152 in 41 households. The following census in 2011 counted 167 people in 61 households. The 2016 census measured the population of the village as 174 people in 63 households.
