= Aghuzbon, Rudbar =

Village in Gilan province, Iran

Aghuzbon Persian: آغوزبن
- Village
- Location within Iran
- Coordinates: 36°48′50″N 49°28′09″E
- Country: Iran
- Province: Gilan
- County: Rudbar
- District: Central
- Rural District: Kalashtar

Population (2016)
  - Total: 122
- Time zone: UTC+3:30 (IRST)

Aghuzbon (Persian: آغوزبن) (Note: Also romanized as Aghoozbon, Āghowzbon, and Āghūzbon; also known as Aguzban and Āqhūzbon) is a village in Kalashtar Rural District of the Central District in Rudbar County, Gilan province, Iran.

== Demographics ==
=== Population ===
At the time of the 2006 National Census, the village's population was 103 in 43 households. The following census in 2011 counted 112 people in 40 households. The 2016 census measured the population of the village as 122 people in 50 households.
