= Shemam =

Village in Gilan province, Iran

Shemam Persian: شمام
- Village
- Location within Iran
- Coordinates: 36°55′28″N 49°28′08″E
- Country: Iran
- Province: Gilan
- County: Rudbar
- District: Central
- Rural District: Rostamabad-e Jonubi

Population (2016)
  - Total: 147
- Time zone: UTC+3:30 (IRST)

Shemam (Persian: شمام) (Note: Also romanized as Shemām and Shomām; also known as Shiman) is a village in Rostamabad-e Jonubi Rural District of the Central District in Rudbar County, Gilan province, Iran.

== Demographics ==
=== Population ===
At the time of the 2006 National Census, the village's population was 132 in 45 households. The following census in 2011 counted 91 people in 28 households. The 2016 census measured the population of the village as 147 people in 53 households.
