= Kaluraz, Rostamabad-e Jonubi =

Village in Gilan province, Iran

Kaluraz Persian: كلورز
- Village
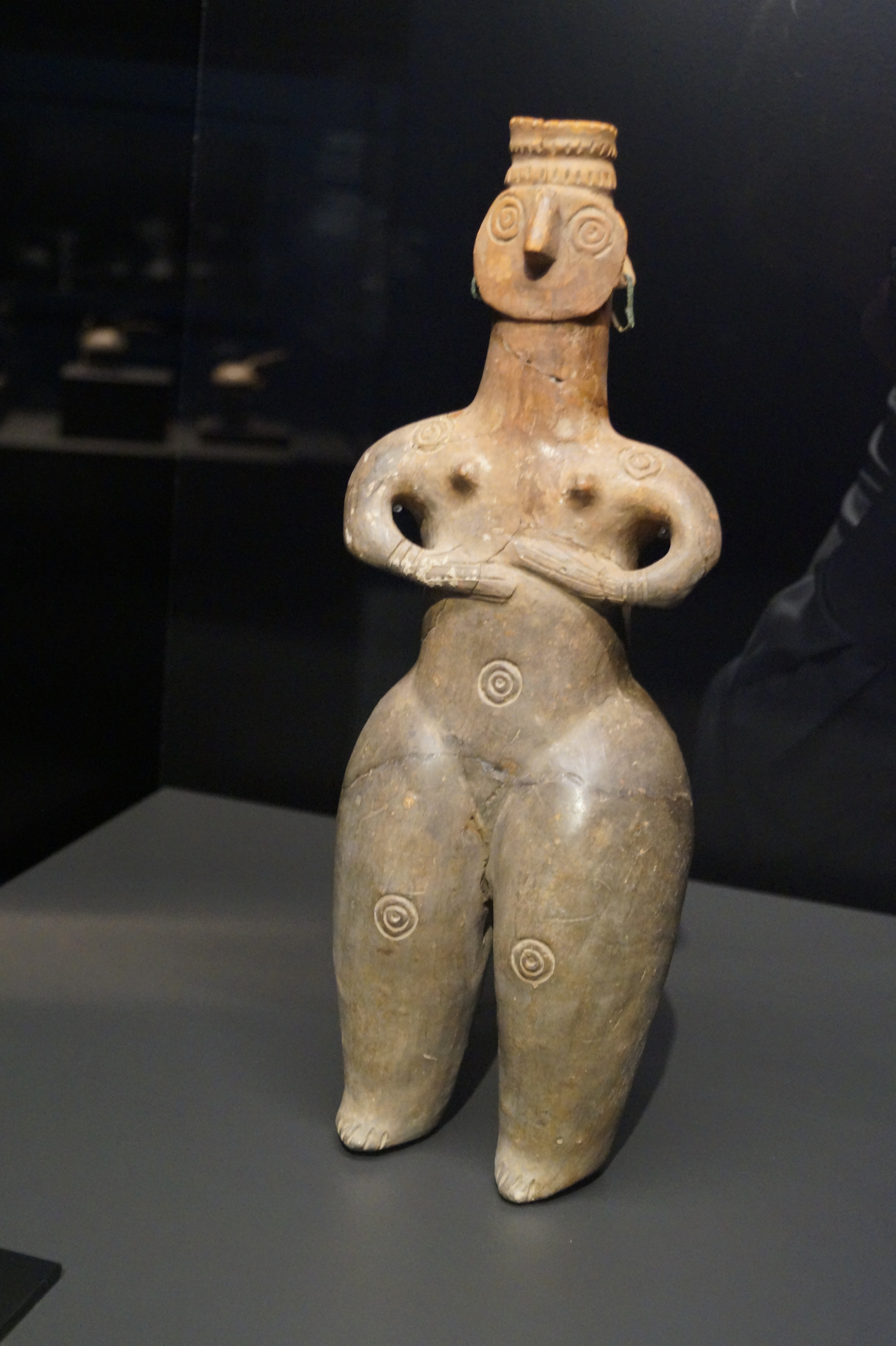
- Ancient statuette from Kaluraz, 800-600 B.C.

- Location within Iran
- Coordinates: 36°53′53″N 49°27′59″E
- Country: Iran
- Province: Gilan
- County: Rudbar
- District: Central
- Rural District: Rostamabad-e Jonubi

Population (2016)
  - Total: 81
- Time zone: UTC+3:30 (IRST)

Kaluraz (Persian: كلورز) (Note: Also romanized as Kalūraz) is a village in Rostamabad-e Jonubi Rural District of the Central District in Rudbar County, Gilan province, Iran.

== Demographics ==
=== Population ===
At the time of the 2006 National Census, the village's population was 86 in 24 households. The following census in 2011 counted 71 people in 24 households. The 2016 census measured the population of the village as 81 people in 31 households.
