= Aminabad, Rudbar =

Village in Gilan province, Iran

Aminabad Persian: امين آباد
- Village
- Location within Iran
- Coordinates: 36°55′58″N 49°30′22″E
- Country: Iran
- Province: Gilan
- County: Rudbar
- District: Central
- Rural District: Rostamabad-e Jonubi

Population (2016)
  - Total: 31
- Time zone: UTC+3:30 (IRST)

Aminabad (Persian: امين آباد) (Note: Also romanized as Amīnābād) is a village in Rostamabad-e Jonubi Rural District of the Central District in Rudbar County, Gilan province, Iran.

== Demographics ==
=== Population ===
At the time of the 2006 National Census, the village's population was 19 in nine households. The following census in 2011 counted 11 people in six households. The 2016 census measured the population of the village as 31 people in 12 households.
