= Fildeh =

Village in Gilan province, Iran

Fildeh Persian: فيلده
- Village
- Location within Iran
- Coordinates: 36°49′16″N 49°23′17″E
- Country: Iran
- Province: Gilan
- County: Rudbar
- District: Central
- Rural District: Rostamabad-e Jonubi

Population (2016)
  - Total: 39
- Time zone: UTC+3:30 (IRST)

Fildeh (Persian: فيلده) (Note: Also romanized as Fīldeh; also known as Falīdah, Falīdeh, Felīd, Felīdeh, and Fil’dy) is a village in Rostamabad-e Jonubi Rural District of the Central District in Rudbar County, Gilan province, Iran.

== Demographics ==
=== Population ===
At the time of the 2006 National Census, the village's population was 20 in five households. The following census in 2011 counted a population below the reporting threshold. The 2016 census measured the population of the village as 39 people in 12 households.
