= Pir Sara, Rudbar =

Pir Sara پيرسرا
- Village
- Location within Iran
- Coordinates: 36°57′18″N 49°31′17″E
- Country: Iran
- Province: Gilan
- County: Rudbar
- Bakhsh: Central
- Rural District: Rostamabad-e Shomali

Population (2006)
  - Total: 23
- Time zone: UTC+3:30 (IRST)

Pir Sara (Persian: پيرسرا, also Romanized as Pīr Sarā; also known as Pīrsarāi, Pirsaran, and Pīr Sarāy) is a village in Rostamabad-e Shomali Rural District, in the Central District of Rudbar County, Gilan Province, Iran. At the 2016 census, its population was 17, in 5 families. Down from 23 in 2006.
