= Loshan =

Loshan may refer to:

- Lowshan, Iran
- Luoshan County, China
- Leshan, China
