= Poshteh, Rudbar =

Village in Gilan province, Iran

Poshteh Persian: پشته
- Village
- Location within Iran
- Coordinates: 36°54′39″N 49°28′12″E
- Country: Iran
- Province: Gilan
- County: Rudbar
- District: Central
- Rural District: Rostamabad-e Jonubi

Population (2016)
  - Total: 53
- Time zone: UTC+3:30 (IRST)

Poshteh (Persian: پشته) (Note: Also known as Pushteh and Pushtekh) is a village in Rostamabad-e Jonubi Rural District of the Central District in Rudbar County, Gilan province, Iran.

== Demographics ==
=== Population ===
At the time of the 2006 National Census, the village's population was 47 in 13 households. The following census in 2011 counted a population below the reporting threshold. The 2016 census measured the population of the village as 53 people in 20 households.
