= Jamalabad Caravanserai =

UNESCO World Heritage Site in Iran

- کاروانسرای جمال آباد (Persian)
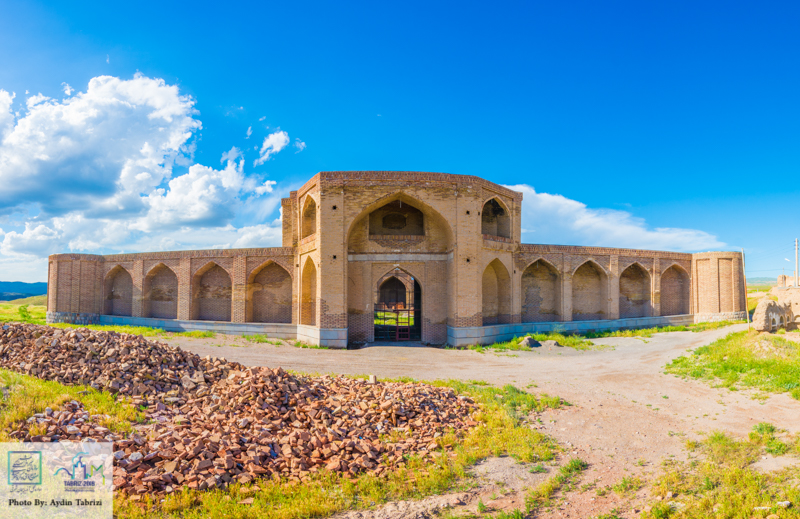
- Interactive map of Jamalabad Caravanserai
- Location: East Azerbaijan province, Iran

History
- Built: Ilkhanate era

Site notes
- Restored: Safavid era
- Restored by: Abbas II of Persia

UNESCO World Heritage Site
- Type: Cultural
- Criteria: ii, iii
- Designated: 2023
- Part of: The Persian Caravanserai
- Reference no.: 1668-009

Jamalabad Caravanserai (Persian: کاروانسرای جمال آباد) (Azerbaijani: جمال آباد کروانسراسی) is a historic caravanserai in Jamalabad, near Mianeh, Iran. It was originally constructed during the Ilkhanate, but was repaired during the reign of Shah Abbas II.

Although the building is attributed to the Ilkhanate, the inscription on top of its gate attributes it to Abbas II, and cites the date of construction as 1654–55.

This building was listed among the national heritage sites of Iran on 29 September 2002 with the number 6152.

== Gallery ==
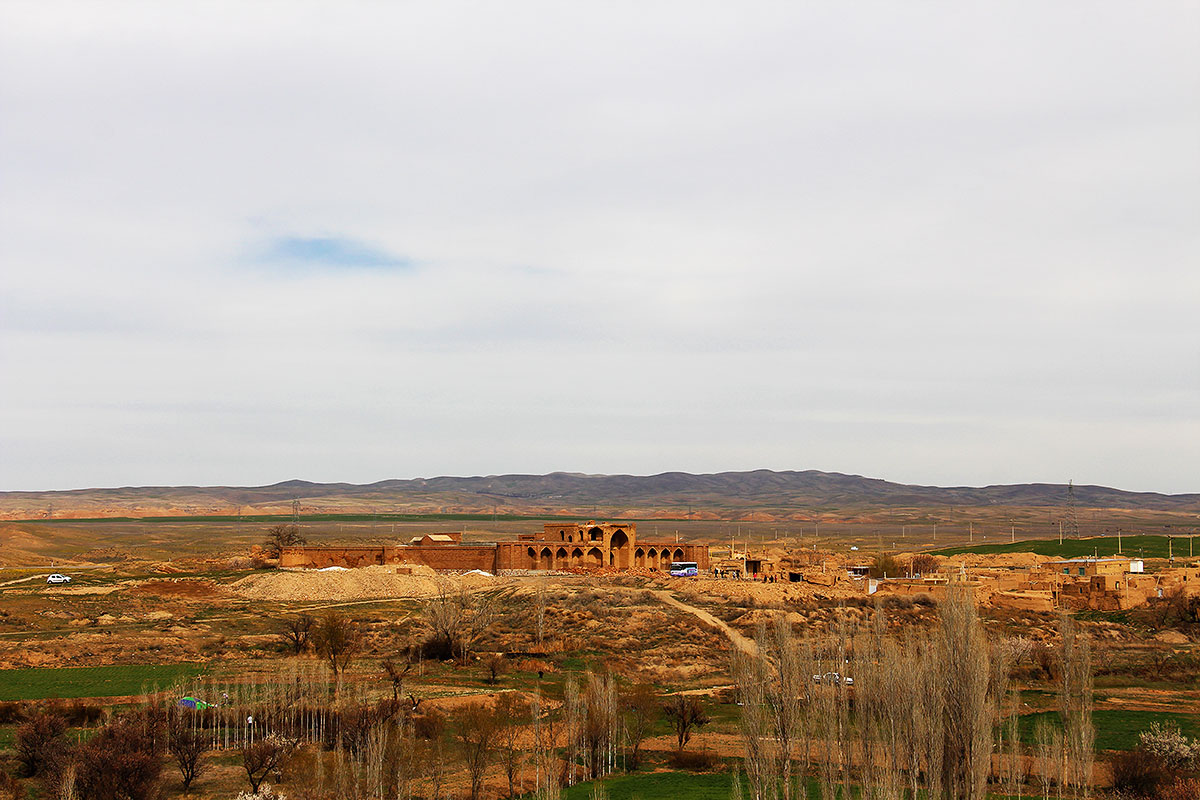

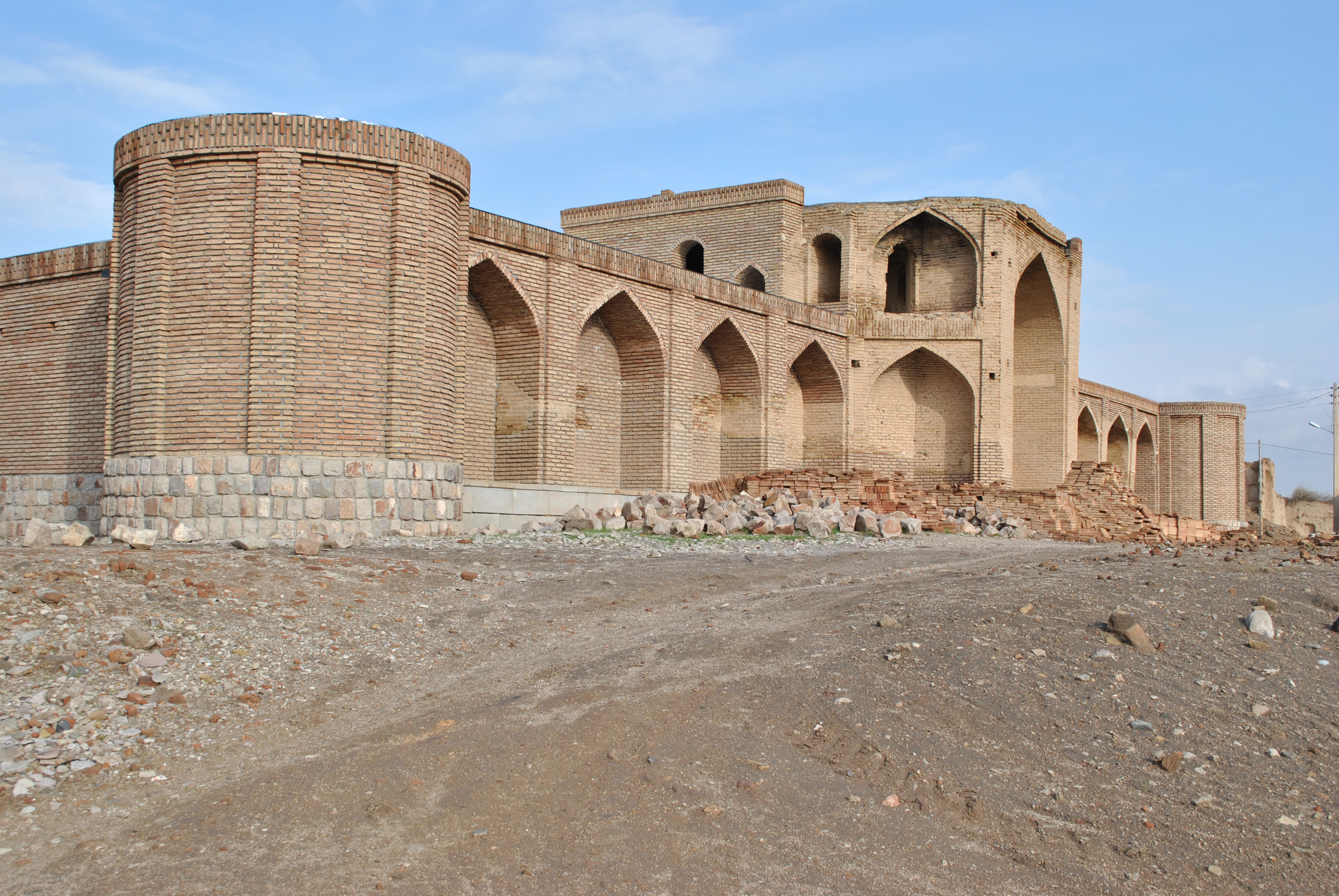

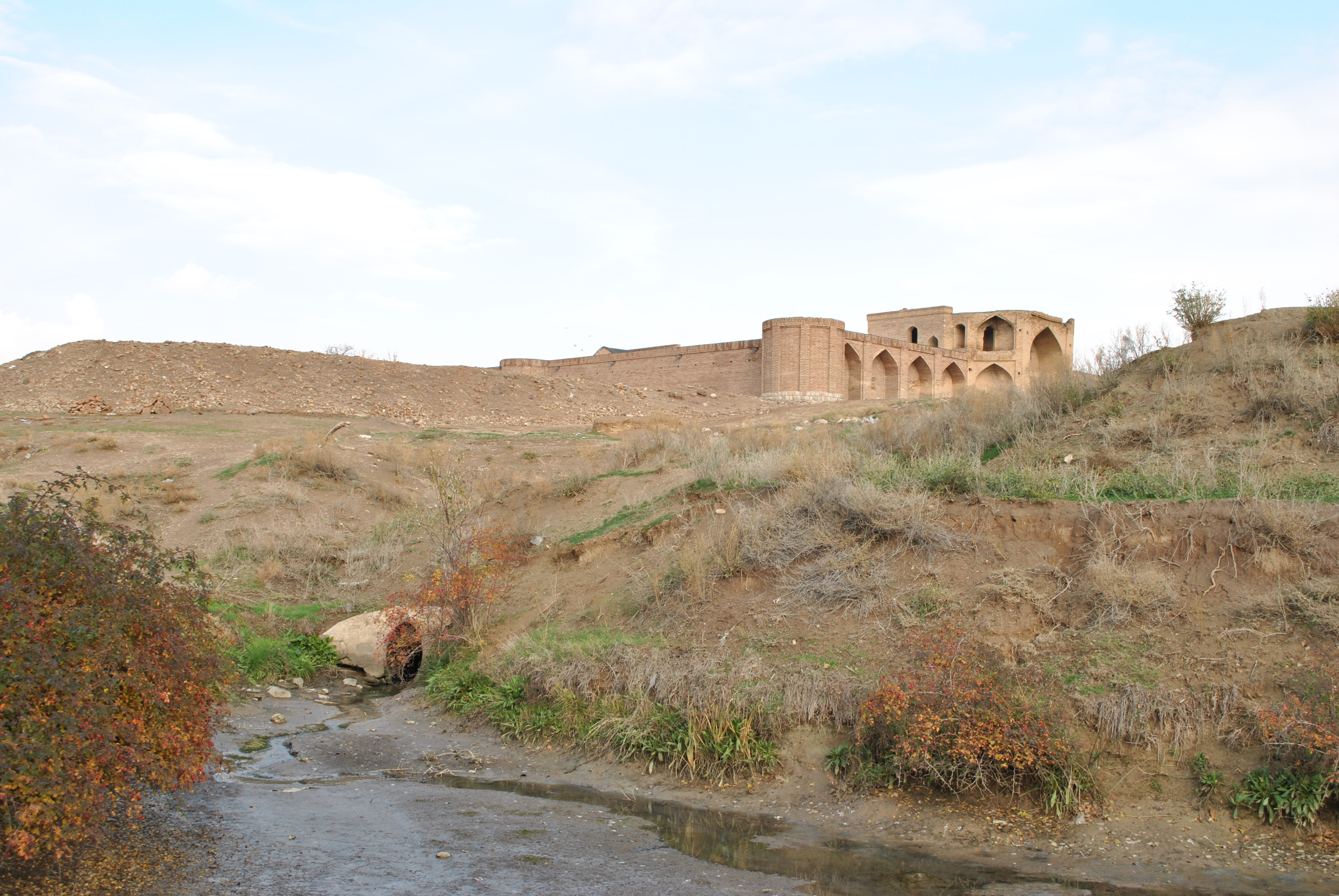

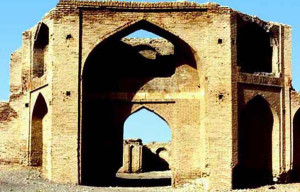
