= Yeylaqi-ye Lakeh =

Village in Gilan province, Iran

Yeylaqi-ye Lakeh Persian: ييلاقی لاكه
- Village
- Location within Iran
- Coordinates: 36°51′25″N 49°20′33″E
- Country: Iran
- Province: Gilan
- County: Rudbar
- District: Central
- Rural District: Rostamabad-e Jonubi

Population (2016)
  - Total: 133
- Time zone: UTC+3:30 (IRST)

Yeylaqi-ye Lakeh (Persian: ييلاقی لاكه) (Note: Also romanized as Yeylāqī-ye Lākeh; also known as Lākeh, Lākeh Yeylāqī, and Lakekh) is a village in Rostamabad-e Jonubi Rural District of the Central District in Rudbar County, Gilan province, Iran.

== Demographics ==
=== Population ===
At the time of the 2006 National Census, the village's population was 30 in 10 households. The following census in 2011 counted 19 people in six households. The 2016 census measured the population of the village as 133 people in 39 households.
