= Rostamabad-e Shomali Rural District =

Rural district in Gilan province, Iran

Rostamabad-e Shomali Rural District Persian: دهستان رستم آباد شمالی
- Rural District
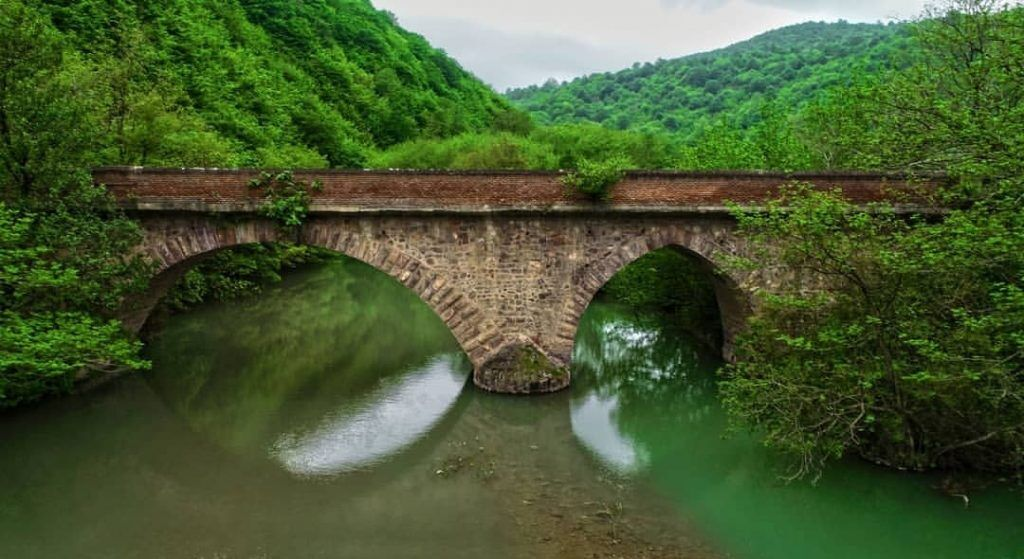
- Old Bridge over Siahrud river

- Location within Iran
- Coordinates: 37°00′N 49°32′E
- Country: Iran
- Province: Gilan
- County: Rudbar
- District: Central
- Established: 1987
- Capital: Eskolak

Population (2016)
  - Total: 2,478
- Time zone: UTC+3:30 (IRST)

Rostamabad-e Shomali Rural District (Persian: دهستان رستم آباد شمالی) is in the Central District of Rudbar County, Gilan province, Iran. Its capital is the village of Eskolak.

== Demographics ==
=== Population ===
At the time of the 2006 National Census, the rural district's population was 2,782 in 757 households. There were 2,549 inhabitants in 796 households at the following census of 2011. The 2016 census measured the population of the rural district as 2,478 in 836 households. The most populous of its 20 villages was Eskolak, with 707 people.

According to 2016 census, of the 20 settlements recorded in census data, five villages had no population (Tusestan, Jur Cheshmeh, Gaz Karak, Bijar Poshteh, and Hezar Marz), and one village was below the reporting threshold (Kalasham).

=== Other villages in the rural district ===
- Bijar Poshteh
- Charman
- Chubtarash Mahalleh
- Diz Kuh
- Harkian
- Hezar Marz
- Kalasham
- Khulak
- Kohneh Van Sara
- Kuleh Kesh
- Mazian
- Pir Sara
- Qaleh Kol
- Reshterud
- Siah Rud Poshteh
- Tuseh Rud
