= Diz Kuh, Gilan =

Village in Gilan province, Iran

Diz Kuh Persian: ديزكوه
- Village
- Location within Iran
- Coordinates: 37°01′01″N 49°35′07″E
- Country: Iran
- Province: Gilan
- County: Rudbar
- District: Central
- Rural District: Rostamabad-e Shomali

Population (2016)
  - Total: 567
- Time zone: UTC+3:30 (IRST)

Diz Kuh (Persian: ديزكوه) (Note: Also romanized as Diz Kooh and Dīz Kūh; also known as Dīzgū) is a village in Rostamabad-e Shomali Rural District of the Central District in Rudbar County, Gilan province, Iran.

== Demographics ==
=== Population ===
At the time of the 2006 National Census, the village's population was 723 in 197 households. The following census in 2011 counted 587 people in 191 households. The 2016 census measured the population of the village as 567 people in 190 households.
