= Kara Rud-e Jamshidabad =

Village in Gilan province, Iran

Kara Rud-e Jamshidabad Persian: كرارود جمشيد آباد
- Village
- Location within Iran
- Coordinates: 36°56′24″N 49°30′26″E
- Country: Iran
- Province: Gilan
- County: Rudbar
- District: Central
- Rural District: Rostamabad-e Jonubi

Population (2016)
  - Total: 281
- Time zone: UTC+3:30 (IRST)

Kara Rud-e Jamshidabad (Persian: كرارود جمشيدآباد) (Note: Also romanized as Karā Rūd-e Jamshīdābād; also known as Dyamshidabad, Jamshīdābād, and Karā Rūd) is a village in Rostamabad-e Jonubi Rural District of the Central District in Rudbar County, Gilan province, Iran.

== Demographics ==
=== Population ===
At the time of the 2006 National Census, the village's population was 401 in 111 households. The following census in 2011 counted 340 people in 106 households. The 2016 census measured the population of the village as 281 people in 94 households.
