= Rostamabad, Gilan =

City in Gilan province, Iran

Rostamabad Persian: رستم آباد
- City
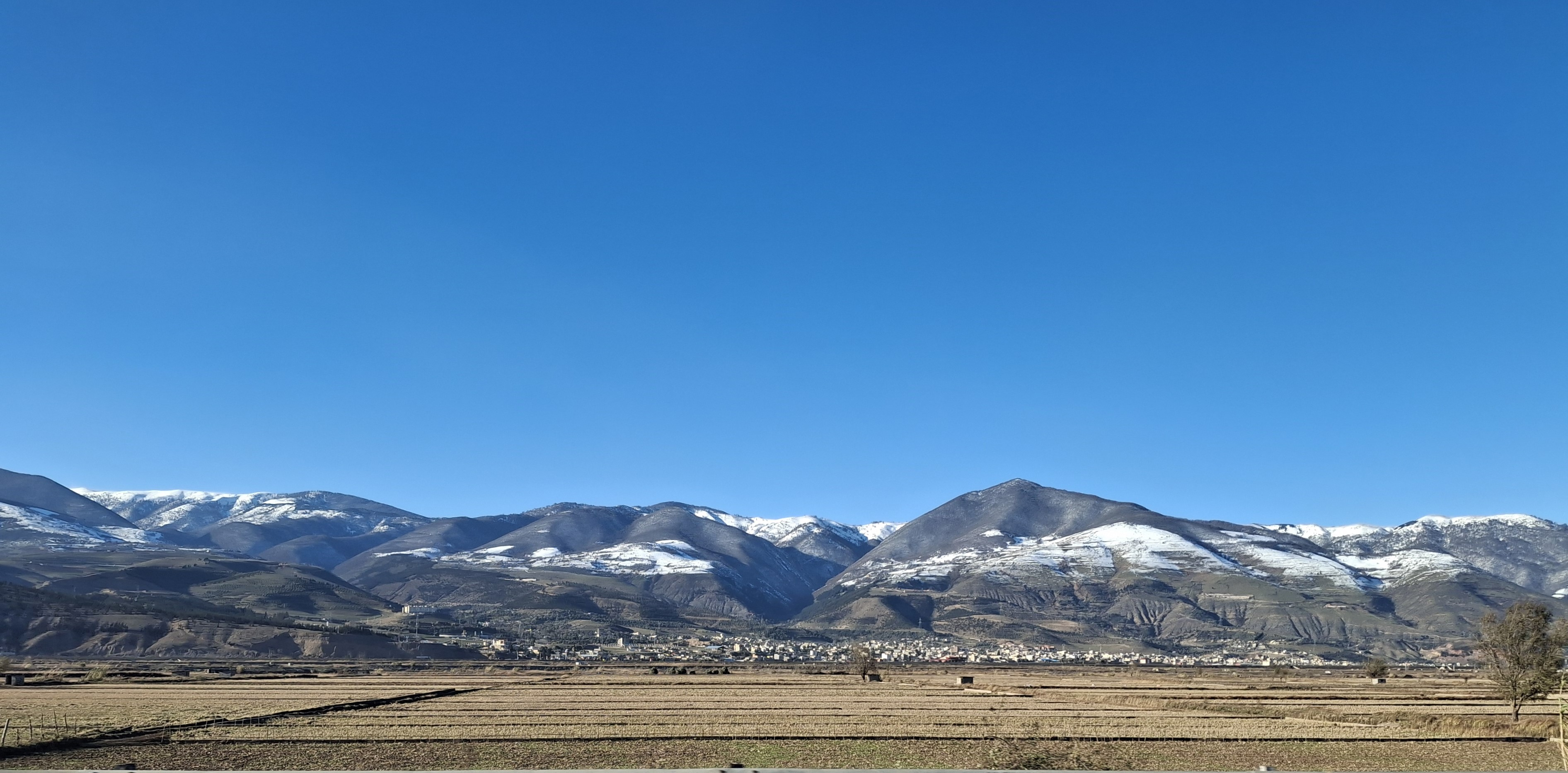
- The city of Rostamabad

- Location within Iran
- Coordinates: 36°53′58″N 49°29′35″E
- Country: Iran
- Province: Gilan
- County: Rudbar
- District: Central
- Established as a city: 1993
- Elevation: 150–250 m (490–820 ft)

Population (2016 Census)
  - Total: 13,746
- Time zone: UTC+3:30 (IRST)

Rostamabad (Persian: رستم آباد) (Note: Also romanized as Rostamābād and Rustamābād; formerly Galūraz, Kalooraz, Kalūraz, and Kuluruz) is a city in the Central District of Rudbar County, Gilan province, Iran, serving as the administrative center for Rostamabad-e Jonubi Rural District. It is on the Sefīd-Rūd river in the Alborz (Elburz) mountain range.

Rostamabad city was formed in 1993 by aggregation of the following settlements: Charbeh, Kalumarz, Koker, Poshteh, Rostamabad, Sanjardeh, and Shemam.

== Demographics ==
=== Population ===
At the time of the 2006 National Census, the city's population was 11,987 in 3,234 households. The following census in 2011 counted 13,749 people in 3,947 households. The 2016 census measured the population of the city as 13,746 people in 4,312 households.

== Climate ==
Rostamabad has a humid subtropical climate (Köppen: Cfa, Trewartha: Cf), with warm, humid summers and cool, wet winters.
