= Rostamabad-e Jonubi Rural District =

Rural district in Gilan province, Iran

Rostamabad-e Jonubi Rural District Persian: دهستان رستم آباد جنوبی
- Rural District
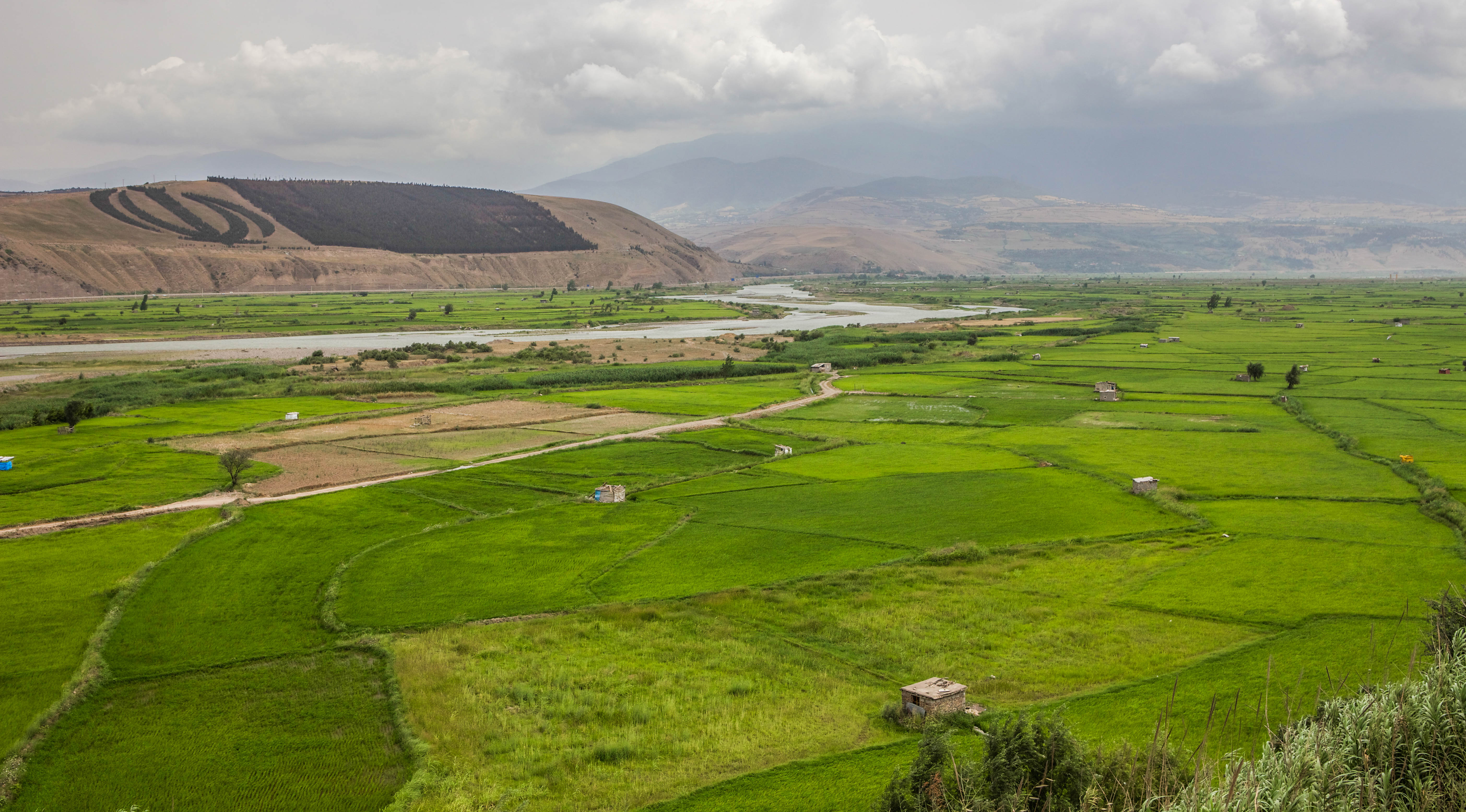
- Rural fields and Sefid Rud River

- Location within Iran
- Coordinates: 36°53′N 49°22′E
- Country: Iran
- Province: Gilan
- County: Rudbar
- District: Central
- Capital: Rostamabad

Population (2016)
  - Total: 3,657
- Time zone: UTC+3:30 (IRST)

Rostamabad-e Jonubi Rural District (Persian: دهستان رستم آباد جنوبی) is in the Central District of Rudbar County, Gilan province, Iran. It is administered from the city of Rostamabad.

== Demographics ==
=== Population ===
At the time of the 2006 National Census, the rural district's population was 3,623 in 1,043 households. There were 3,489 inhabitants in 1,103 households at the following census of 2011. The 2016 census measured the population of the rural district as 3,657 in 1,265 households. The most populous of its 16 villages was Juben, with 1,478 people.

=== Other villages in the rural district ===
- Aminabad
- Fildeh
- Ganjeh
- Kaluraz
- Kara Rud-e Jamshidabad
- Poshteh
- Shemam
- Yeylaqi-ye Darestan
- Yeylaqi-ye Dugaheh
- Yeylaqi-ye Lakeh
