= Bigdeli =

Bigdeli is a surname. Notable people with the surname include:

- Ali Bigdeli (born 1987), Iranian football player
- Azar Bigdeli (1722–1781), Iranian anthologist and poet
- Gholamhossein Bigdeli (1919–1998), Iranian writer
- Ruhollah Bigdeli (born 1986, Iranian football player
- Schahriar Bigdeli (born 1980), German long jumper
- Yadollah Bigdeli (1883–1960), Iranian official
