= Jamalabad, Baft =

Jamalabad جمال اباد
- Village
- Location within Iran
- Coordinates: 29°14′15″N 56°30′20″E
- Country: Iran
- Province: Kerman
- County: Baft
- Bakhsh: Central
- Rural District: Fathabad

Population (2006)
  - Total: 60
- Time zone: UTC+3:30 (IRST)
  - Summer (DST): UTC+4:30 (IRDT)

Jamalabad (Persian: جمال اباد, also Romanized as Jamālābād) is a village in Fathabad Rural District, in the Central District of Baft County, Kerman Province, Iran. At the 2006 census, its population was 60, in 11 families.
