= Qaleh-ye Dezh Kuh =

Village in Kohgiluyeh and Boyer-Ahmad, Iran

Qaleh-ye Dezh Kuh قلعه دژكوه
- Village
- Location within Iran
- Coordinates: 30°53′40″N 50°23′07″E
- Country: Iran
- Province: Kohgiluyeh and Boyer-Ahmad
- County: Kohgiluyeh
- Bakhsh: Central
- Rural District: Tayebi-ye Garmsiri-ye Jonubi

Population (2006)
  - Total: 65
- Time zone: UTC+3:30 (IRST)
  - Summer (DST): UTC+4:30 (IRDT)

Qaleh-ye Dezh Kuh (Persian: قلعه دژكوه, also Romanized as Qal‘eh-ye Dezh Kūh; also known as Dezh Kūh, Dozd Kūh, Qal‘eh Duzdkūd, Qal‘eh-ye Dozd Kūh, and Qal‘eh-ye Dozheh Kūh) is a village in Tayebi-ye Garmsiri-ye Jonubi Rural District, in the Central District of Kohgiluyeh County, Kohgiluyeh and Boyer-Ahmad Province, Iran. At the 2006 census, its population was 65, in 18 families.
