= Jamilabad, Kerman =

Jamilabad جميل اباد
- Village
- Location within Iran
- Coordinates: 29°14′38″N 56°29′05″E
- Country: Iran
- Province: Kerman
- County: Baft
- Bakhsh: Central
- Rural District: Fathabad

Population (2006)
  - Total: 304
- Time zone: UTC+3:30 (IRST)
  - Summer (DST): UTC+4:30 (IRDT)

Jamilabad (Persian: جميل اباد, also Romanized as Jamīlābād) is a village in Fathabad Rural District, in the Central District of Baft County, Kerman Province, Iran. At the 2006 census, its population was 304, in 67 families.
