= Jamalabad, Meyaneh =

Jamalabad جمال اباد
- Village
- Location within Iran
- Coordinates: 37°16′17″N 47°50′38″E
- Country: Iran
- Province: East Azerbaijan
- County: Meyaneh
- Bakhsh: Kaghazkonan
- Rural District: Qaflankuh-e Sharqi

Population (2006)
  - Total: 24
- Time zone: UTC+3:30 (IRST)
  - Summer (DST): UTC+4:30 (IRDT)

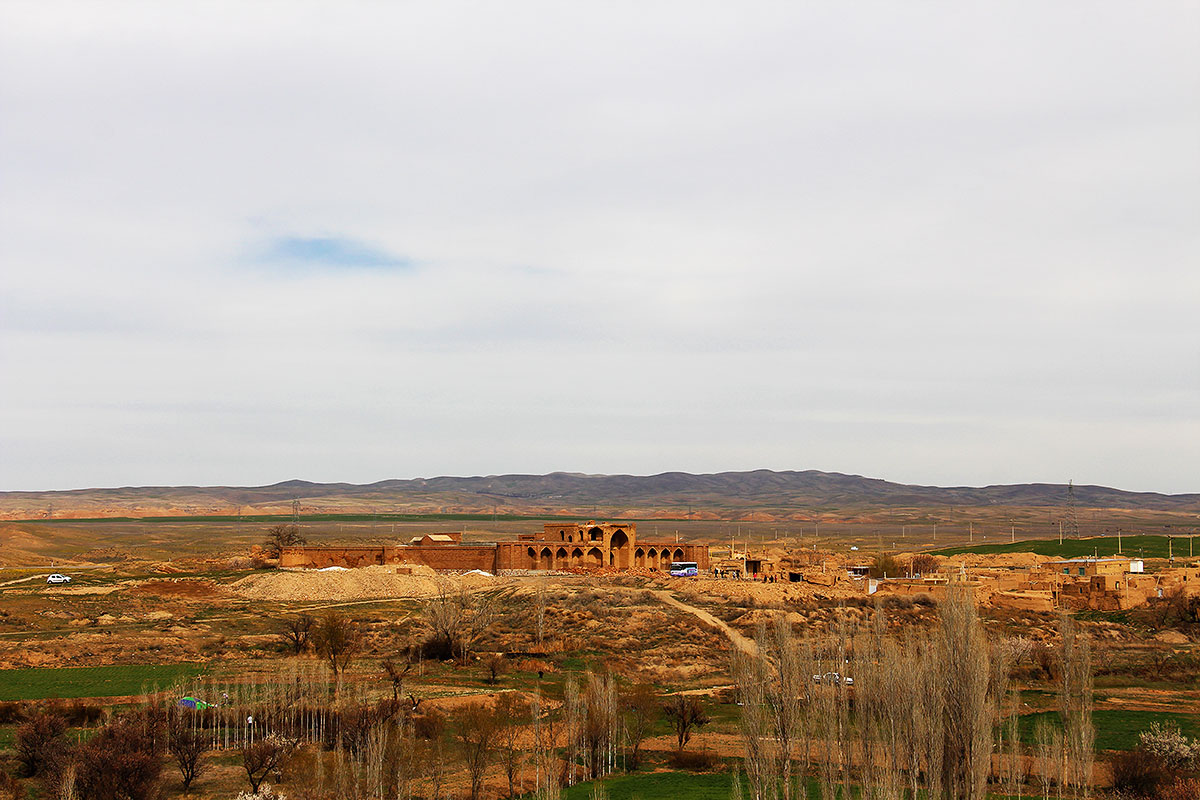

Jamalabad (Persian: جمال اباد, also Romanized as Jamālābād) is a village in Qaflankuh-e Sharqi Rural District, Kaghazkonan District, Meyaneh County, East Azerbaijan Province, Iran. At the 2006 census, its population was 24, in 8 families.

The Jamalabad Caravanserai is located nearby this village.
