= Jamalabad, Lamerd =

Jamalabad جمال اباد
- Village
- Location within Iran
- Coordinates: 27°15′00″N 53°22′32″E
- Country: Iran
- Province: Fars
- County: Lamerd
- Bakhsh: Central
- Rural District: Sigar

Population (2006)
  - Total: 165
- Time zone: UTC+3:30 (IRST)
  - Summer (DST): UTC+4:30 (IRDT)

Jamalabad (Persian: جمال اباد, also Romanized as Jamālābād; also known as Ḩamālābād) is a village in Sigar Rural District, in the Central District of Lamerd County, Fars province, Iran. At the 2006 census, its population was 165, in 37 families.
