= Jamalabad, Marvdasht =

Jamalabad جمال اباد
- Village
- Location within Iran
- Coordinates: 30°00′50″N 52°33′54″E
- Country: Iran
- Province: Fars
- County: Marvdasht
- Bakhsh: Dorudzan
- Rural District: Ramjerd-e Do

Population (2006)
  - Total: 226
- Time zone: UTC+3:30 (IRST)
  - Summer (DST): UTC+4:30 (IRDT)

Jamalabad (Persian: جمال اباد, also Romanized as Jamālābād) is a village in Ramjerd-e Do Rural District, Dorudzan District, Marvdasht County, Fars province, Iran. At the 2006 census, its population was 226, in 49 families.
