= Jamalabad-e Qadiri =

Jamalabad-e Qadiri جمال ابادقديري
- Village
- Location within Iran
- Coordinates: 28°19′24″N 57°54′32″E
- Country: Iran
- Province: Kerman
- County: Anbarabad
- Bakhsh: Central
- Rural District: Jahadabad

Population (2006)
  - Total: 38
- Time zone: UTC+3:30 (IRST)
  - Summer (DST): UTC+4:30 (IRDT)

Jamalabad-e Qadiri (Persian: جمال ابادقديري, also Romanized as Jamālābād-e Qadīrī; also known as Jamālābād) is a village in Jahadabad Rural District, in the Central District of Anbarabad County, Kerman Province, Iran. At the 2006 census, its population was 38, in 5 families.
