= Rudbar =

City in Gilan province, Iran

Rudbar Persian: رودبار
- City
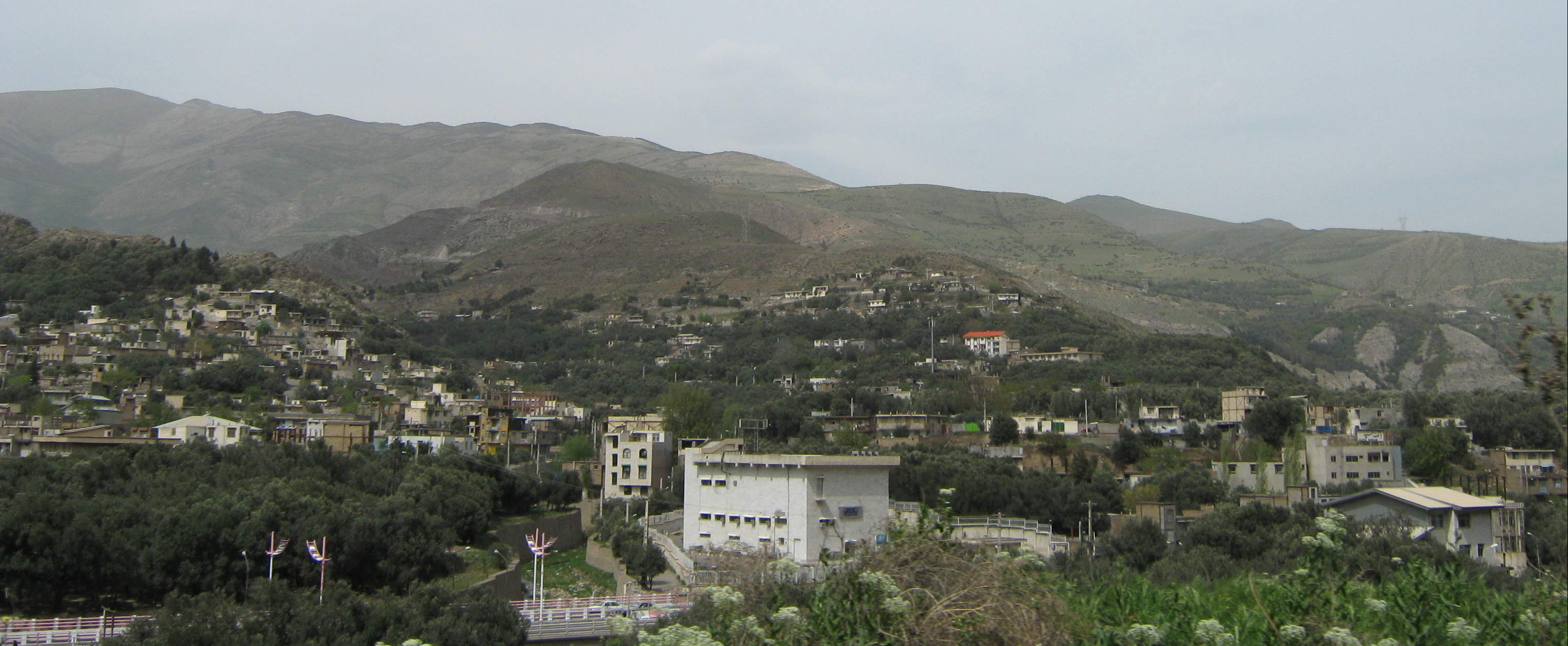
- The city of Rudbar

- Location within Iran
- Coordinates: 36°49′15″N 49°25′36″E
- Country: Iran
- Province: Gilan
- County: Rudbar
- District: Central

Population (2016)
  - Total: 10,504
- Time zone: UTC+3:30 (IRST)
- Area code: +98(013)

Rudbar (Persian: رودبار) (Note: Also romanized as Rudbār; Gilaki: Rubâr) is a city in the Central District of Rudbar County, Gilan province, Iran, serving as capital of both the county and the district.

== Etymology ==
Its name (meaning "by the river" in Persian) is a reference to the river Sepid Rood (Sepid Roud) that passes by the city. Rudbar is also called "Roodbar Zeitoun (olive)" for the olive gardens in the area.

== History ==
The civilization of Rudbar and its surroundings date back to about 3000 years BCE. The Marlik bowl, a famous archeological artifact and one of the oldest gold bowls in the world from 1st millennium BC, was found there. With the advent of Islam, tribes from Damascus and Halab (Aleppo) immigrated and became settlers there. Later, Nizari Isma'ili da'i made inroads and eventually established an Assassin stronghold. During the reign of Nader Shah, groups from the Kurds of Quchan and areas of northern Khorasan also settled there.

Benjamin of Tudela reported that Rudbar had 20,000 Jews in 1170.

Rudbar was near the epicenter of the 1990 Manjil–Rudbar earthquake of magnitude 7.3 on the Richter scale (MS=7.7, MW=7.3, mb=6.4) at 12:31am local time on 21 June 1990, that killed around 50,000 and injured 100,000 city residents. Despite reconstruction, it has not fully recovered.

== Demographics ==
=== Language and ethnicity ===
Main language there is the Roudbari Language, a subdivision of Mard indigenous language. There are several dialects and ethnicities in Gilan who have either their own language from South Caspies or slight variations to the way they speak. Some of these "sub-dialects" of Gilaki are Rashti, Some’e Sarai, Eastern Gilaki (Lahijan, Langerud, Rudesar, Amlash, chaboksar). The majority of the people in Rudbar are Mards, and a minority are Talysh. They speak the Tati Language and Gilaki.

=== Population ===
At the time of the 2006 National Census, the city's population was 11,454 in 3,303 households. The following census in 2011 counted 10,926 people in 3,406 households. The 2016 census measured the population of the city as 10,504 people in 3,559 households.

== Geography ==
Rudbar is located 65 kilometres (40 mi) south of Rasht, and is 261 kilometres (162 mi) away from Tehran. It is located on the fringes of a valley through which the Sepid River (Sepidrood in Persian, Esparoo in Rudbari language) flows, and has a variable climate. Rudbar can be considered as a gateway to Gilan province from central Iran.

=== Climate ===
Rudbar has a hot semi-arid climate (BSh) in the Köppen climate classification.

Climate data for Rudbar (2016-2023 normals)
Month	Jan	Feb	Mar	Apr	May	Jun	Jul	Aug	Sep	Oct	Nov	Dec	Year
Mean daily maximum °C (°F)	13.95 (57.11)	14.73 (58.51)	17.96 (64.33)	22.82 (73.08)	27.95 (82.31)	31.75 (89.15)	33.33 (91.99)	32.44 (90.39)	29.35 (84.83)	23.98 (75.16)	18.18 (64.72)	14.90 (58.82)	23.44 (74.20)
Mean daily minimum °C (°F)	5.35 (41.63)	5.80 (42.44)	7.91 (46.24)	11.67 (53.01)	16.99 (62.58)	21.59 (70.86)	23.61 (74.50)	23.01 (73.42)	20.01 (68.02)	15.09 (59.16)	10.05 (50.09)	6.94 (44.49)	14.00 (57.20)
Average precipitation mm (inches)	48.67 (1.92)	43.7 (1.72)	49.84 (1.96)	31.61 (1.24)	17.51 (0.69)	8.44 (0.33)	7.6 (0.30)	4.8 (0.19)	5.16 (0.20)	22.41 (0.88)	50.0 (1.97)	36.7 (1.44)	326.44 (12.84)

== Economy ==
Rudbar's local economy notably includes olives and olive-based products. Groves of olive trees surround the city. Olive oil is produced locally. Rudbar is also known for its cream-hued, handcrafted carpets of fine quality. Despite the olive gardens that may suggest presence of a Mediterranean climate, the winters are very cold in the area. The winds in the Sepid Rood valley (Manjil) are well known in the country.

== See also ==
Media related to Rudbar at Wikimedia Commons
