= Kalashtar Rural District =

Rural district in Gilan province, Iran

Kalashtar Rural District Persian: دهستان كلشتر
- Rural District
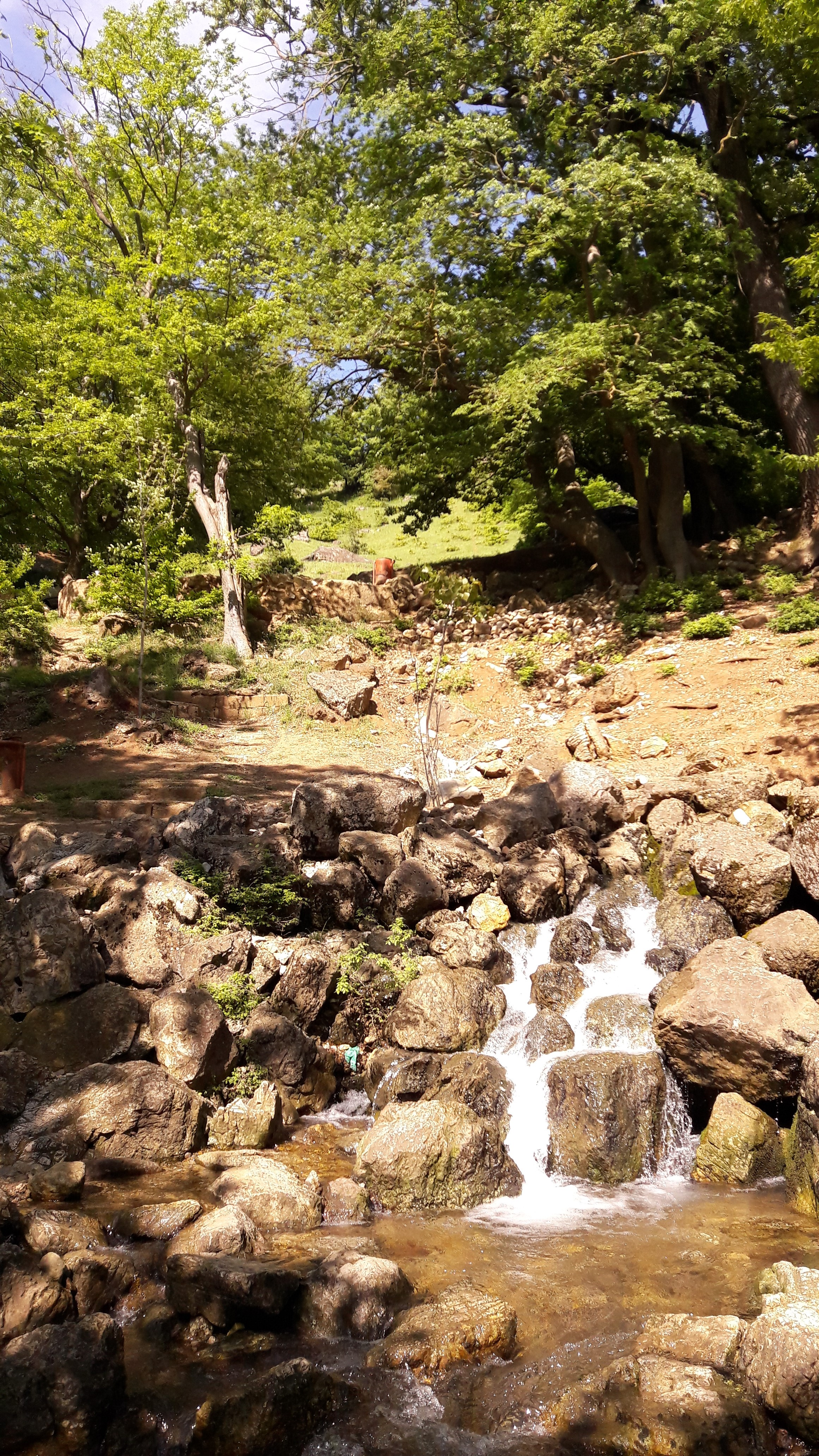
- Bar water spring, Kalashtar

- Location within Iran
- Coordinates: 36°43′N 49°28′E
- Country: Iran
- Province: Gilan
- County: Rudbar
- District: Central
- Established: 1987
- Capital: Aliabad

Population (2016)
  - Total: 4,289
- Time zone: UTC+3:30 (IRST)

Kalashtar Rural District (Persian: دهستان كلشتر) is in the Central District of Rudbar County, Gilan province, Iran. Its capital is the village of Aliabad. The previous capital of the rural district was the village of Jamalabad-e Kuseh, and prior to that time, its capital was the village of Kalashtar.

== Demographics ==
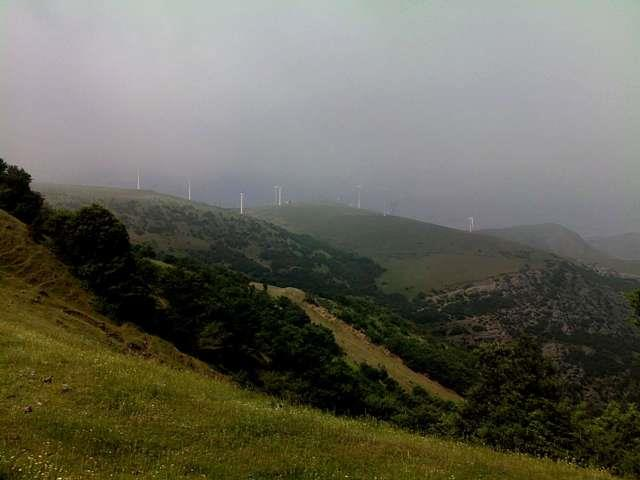
The highlands of Kalashtar

=== Population ===
At the time of the 2006 National Census, the rural district's population was 5,327 in 1,432 households. There were 5,329 inhabitants in 1,560 households at the following census of 2011. The 2016 census measured the population of the rural district as 4,289 in 1,287 households. The most populous of its 27 villages was Aliabad, with 1,605 people.

=== Other villages in the rural district ===
- Aghuzbon
- Dashtagan
- Galivarz
- Razkand
- Sefid Rud
- Tala Bar
