= Lowshan District =

District in Gilan province, Iran

Lowshan District Persian: بخش لوشان
- District
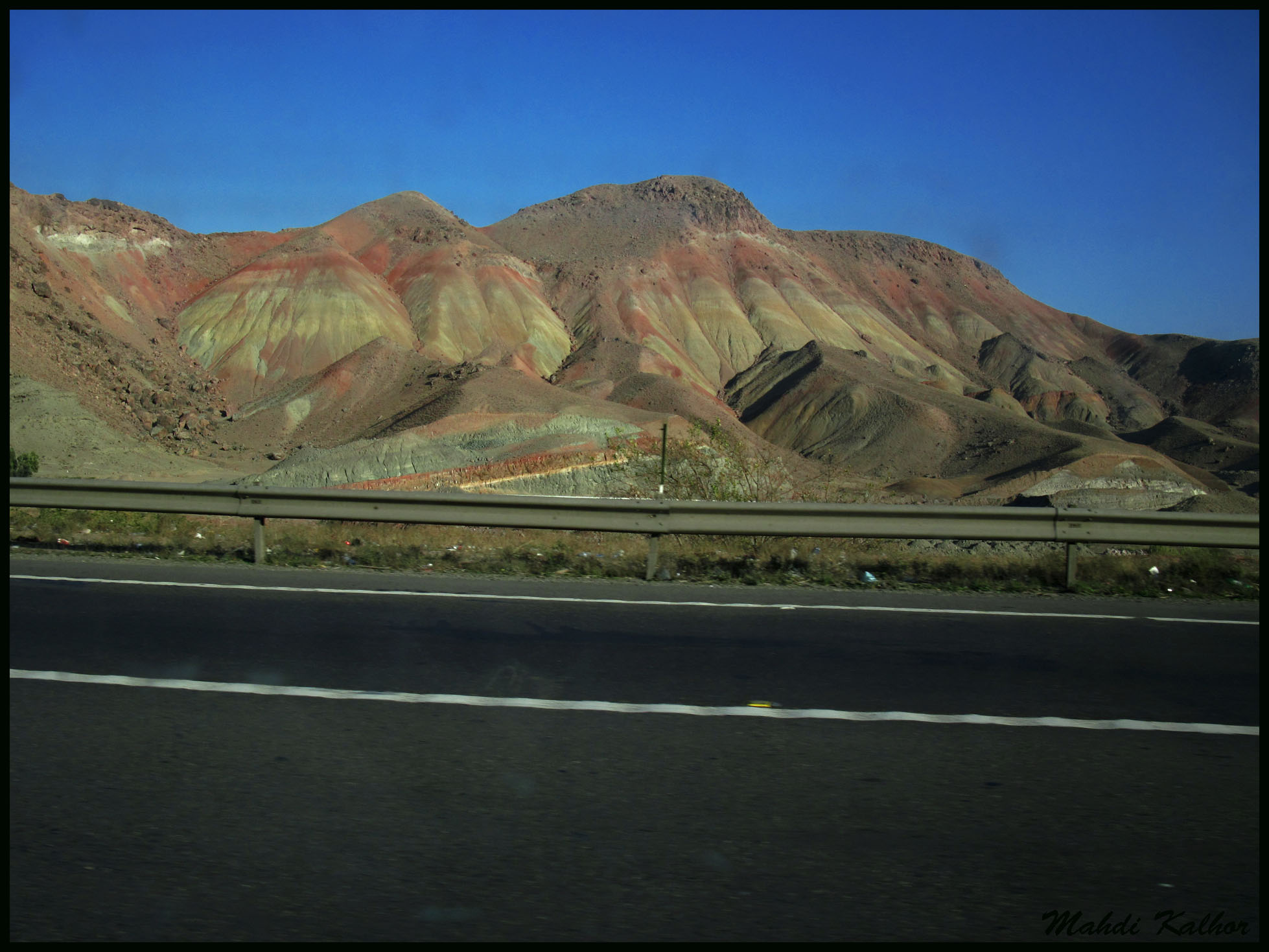
- Colorful mountains in Lowshan district

- Location within Iran
- Coordinates: 36°38′N 49°31′E
- Country: Iran
- Province: Gilan
- County: Rudbar
- Established: 2024
- Capital: Lowshan
- Time zone: UTC+3:30 (IRST)

Lowshan District (Persian: بخش لوشان) is in Rudbar County, Gilan province, Iran. Its capital is the city of Lowshan.

== History ==
In 2024, 12 villages and the city of Lowshan were separated from the Central District in the formation of Lowshan District.

== Demographics ==
=== Administrative divisions ===
Lowshan District
Administrative Divisions
Jamalabad RD
Pachenar RD
Lowshan (city)
RD = Rural District
