= Lowshan =

City in Gilan province, Iran

Lowshan Persian: لوشان
- City
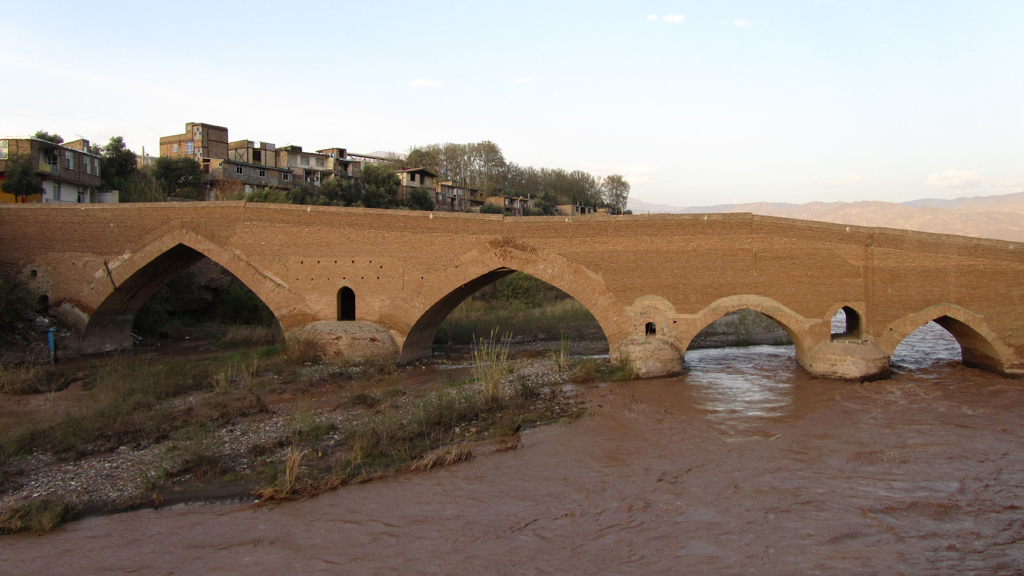

- Location within Iran
- Coordinates: 36°37′40″N 49°30′41″E
- Country: Iran
- Province: Gilan
- County: Rudbar
- District: Lowshan

Population (2016 Census)
  - Total: 13,032
- Time zone: UTC+3:30 (IRST)

Lowshan (Persian: لوشان) (Note: Also romanized as Looshan and Lowshān; also known as Loshan, Pol-e-Lowshān and Pul'-i-Loshan) is a city in, and the capital of, Lowshan District of Rudbar County, Gilan province, Iran. It is located on the Shahrood river in the Alborz (Elburz) mountain range.

== History ==
In the beginning of the 13th century, Shamlu clan from Bigdeli tribe lived in Lowshan village of Tarom. Both Lowšān and Manjil had a mainly Turkish population from the ʿAmmārlu tribe, together with Tats and Kurds, and belonged to the ʿAmmārlu district.

== Demographics ==
=== Population ===
At the time of the 2006 National Census, the city's population was 14,596 in 3,584 households, when it was in the Central District. The following census in 2011 counted 15,193 people in 4,264 households. The 2016 census measured the population of the city as 13,032 people in 3,958 households.

In 2024, 12 villages and the city of Lowshan were separated from the district in the formation of Lowshan District.
