= Central District (Rudbar County) =

District in Gilan province, Iran

Central District (Rudbar County) Persian: بخش مرکزی شهرستان رودبار
- District
- Location within Iran
- Coordinates: 36°50′N 49°24′E
- Country: Iran
- Province: Gilan
- County: Rudbar
- Capital: Rudbar

Population (2016)
  - Total: 63,336
- Time zone: UTC+3:30 (IRST)

The Central District of Rudbar County (Persian: بخش مرکزی شهرستان رودبار) is in Gilan province, Iran. Its capital is the city of Rudbar.

== History ==
In 2024, 12 villages and the city of Lowshan were separated from the district in the formation of Lowshan District.

== Demographics ==
=== Population ===
At the time of the 2006 National Census, the district's population was 65,797 in 17,800 households. The following census in 2011 counted 68,631 people in 20,106 households. The 2016 census measured the population of the district as 63,336 inhabitants in 20,167 households.

=== Administrative divisions ===
Central District (Rudbar County) Population
Administrative Divisions	2006	2011	2016
Kalashtar RD	5,327	5,329	4,289
Rostamabad-e Jonubi RD	3,623	3,489	3,657
Rostamabad-e Shomali RD	2,782	2,549	2,478
Lowshan (city) (Note: Transferred to Lowshan District after the 2016 census)	14,596	15,193	13,032
Manjil (city)	16,028	17,396	15,630
Rostamabad (city)	11,987	13,749	13,746
Rudbar (city)	11,454	10,926	10,504
Total	65,797	68,631	63,336
RD = Rural District
