= Grand Casemates (disambiguation) =

Grand Casemates may refer to:

- Grand Casemates, a former casemate and barracks in Gibraltar
- Grand Casemates Gates, a gate in the northern defensive wall of Gibraltar
- Grand Casemates Square, a public square in Gibraltar
