= Ceremony of the Keys (Gibraltar) =

Re-enactment

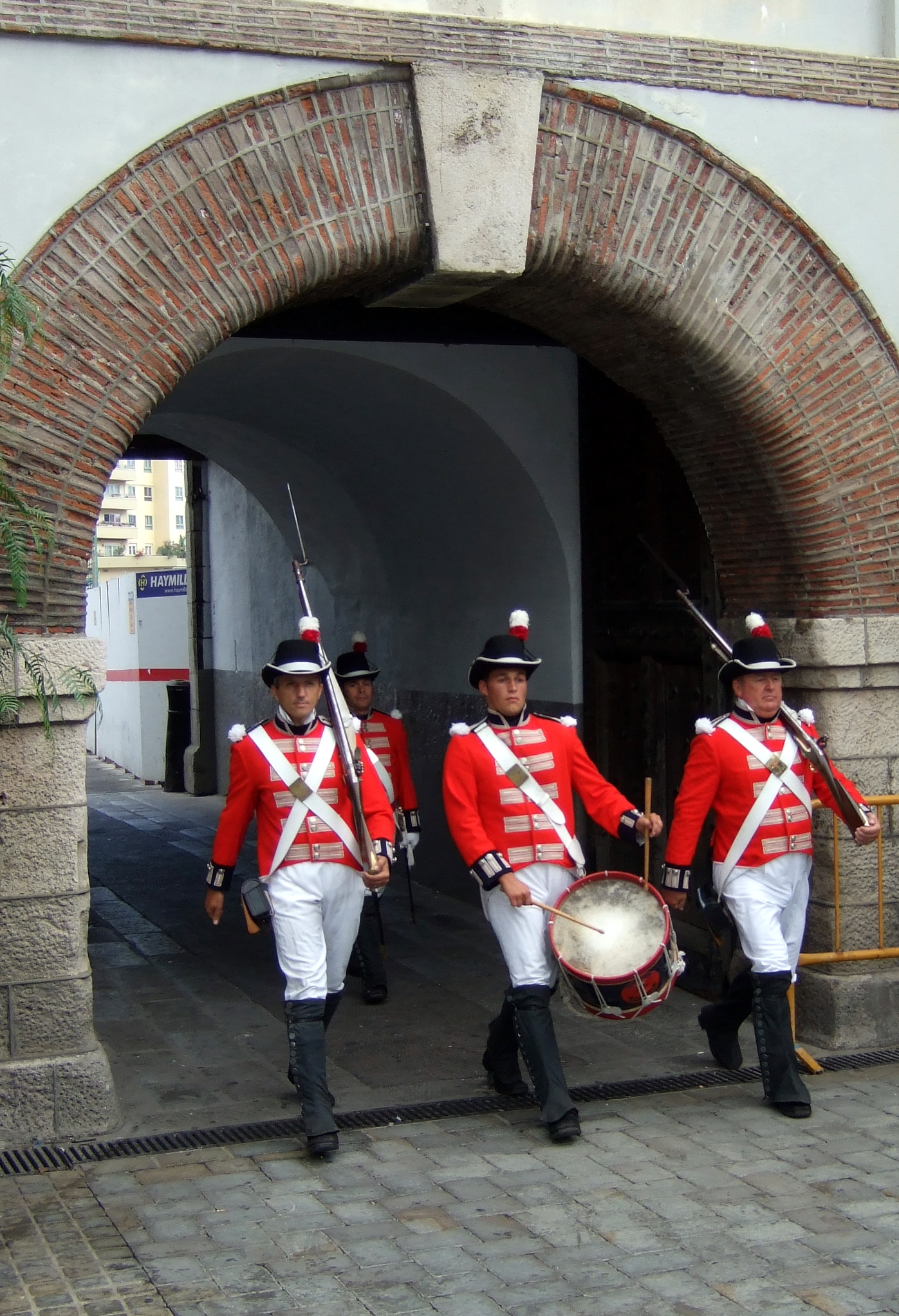
Re-enactment of the Ceremony of the Keys at Grand Casemates Square, Gibraltar, by History Alive.

The Ceremony of the Keys event is a re-enactment of the locking of the gates to the old Town and garrison of Gibraltar.

During the 18th and 19th centuries, the sea came up to the defensive walls and there were four outer gates through which the town could be entered. Four keys locked these entrances to the town. The ceremony's origins date from the Great Siege of Gibraltar, which started in 1779 when French and Spanish troops attempted to capture Gibraltar. The keys were kept by the Governor who would hand them to the Port (Gate) Sergeant each evening at sunset, so that the four land entrances could be locked shut. The Gate Sergeant with an escort consisting of several armed soldiers, fife and drums would then march to each of the four gates in turn. He would be challenged by the sentry at the gate with the same words as used in London. Once all the gates were locked, the keys would be returned to the Governor at The Convent. In the morning, the Port Sergeant would once again collect the keys to open the town.

During the Great Siege, the Governor, General Sir George Augustus Eliott, reputedly would carry the keys with him everywhere; it was rumoured he slept with them under his pillow at night.

The ceremony was reinstituted in 1933 and is currently performed twice a year (in April and October) by the Royal Gibraltar Regiment and visiting British units and bands. In the modern version of the ceremony, at the firing of the sunset gun, after the flags have been lowered, the Governor of Gibraltar symbolically hands the keys of the fortress to the Port Sergeant. The Port Sergeant, accompanied by an armed escort, marches away to symbolically lock the gates of the fortress for the night before returning the keys to the Governor. The party is also accompanied by drums and fifes, to sound a warning for aliens to leave before the gates are closed. The Ceremony is held only at one of the four gates, Grand Casemates Gates (the old Waterport Gates) at Casemates Square, and following the salute of the guard, the National Anthem God Save the King is played. At official dinners at the Governor's residence, the Keys are piped in by the Port Sergeant who hands them to the Governor declaring the fortress to be locked and safe, these are then placed on a cushion on the table where they remain during the meal.
