= Band and Corps of Drums of the Royal Gibraltar Regiment =

The Band and Corps of Drums of the Royal Gibraltar Regiment is the regimental band of the Royal Gibraltar Regiment of the British Army. The Band usually performs in ceremonial duties in and outside of Gibraltar.

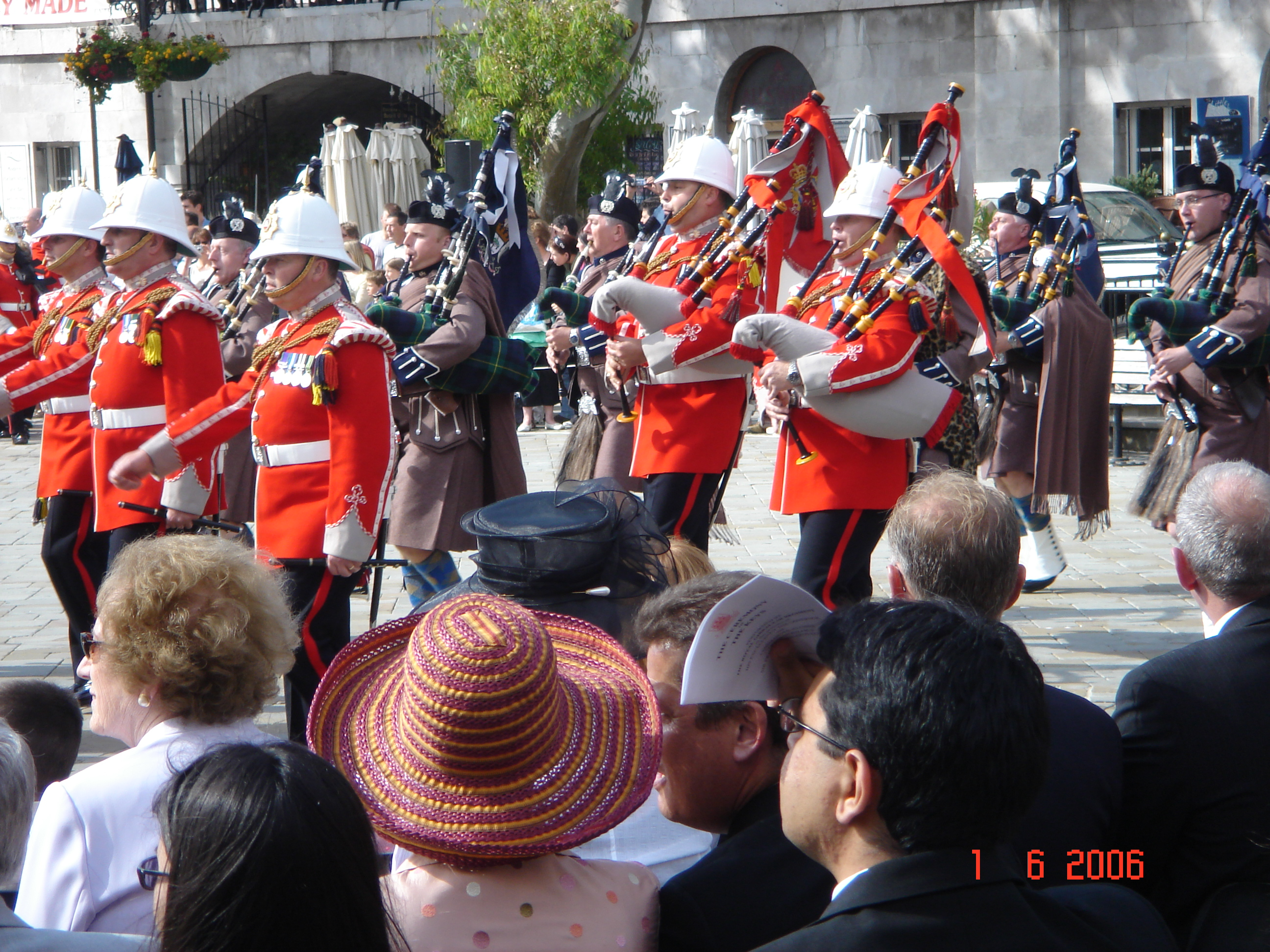
Royal Gibraltar Regiment Band along with pipers from the London Regiment perform at the Ceremony of the Keys.

== History ==
In 1958, the Gibraltar Defence Force became the Gibraltar Regiment under the British Army, serving as the home defence unit of Gibraltar. They became the Royal Gibraltar Regiment in 1999, on the 60th anniversary of their formation. In 1972, the Band and Corps of Drums were established, starting off small. The inspiration behind starting a Band and Corps of Drums came from Major Arthur Ferrary, who took over the regiment in August 1972.

== See also ==
- British Armed Forces
- Royal Corps of Army Music
