= Royal Gibraltar Regiment =

Infantry regiment of the British Army

Coordinates: 36.149028°N 5.3419°W

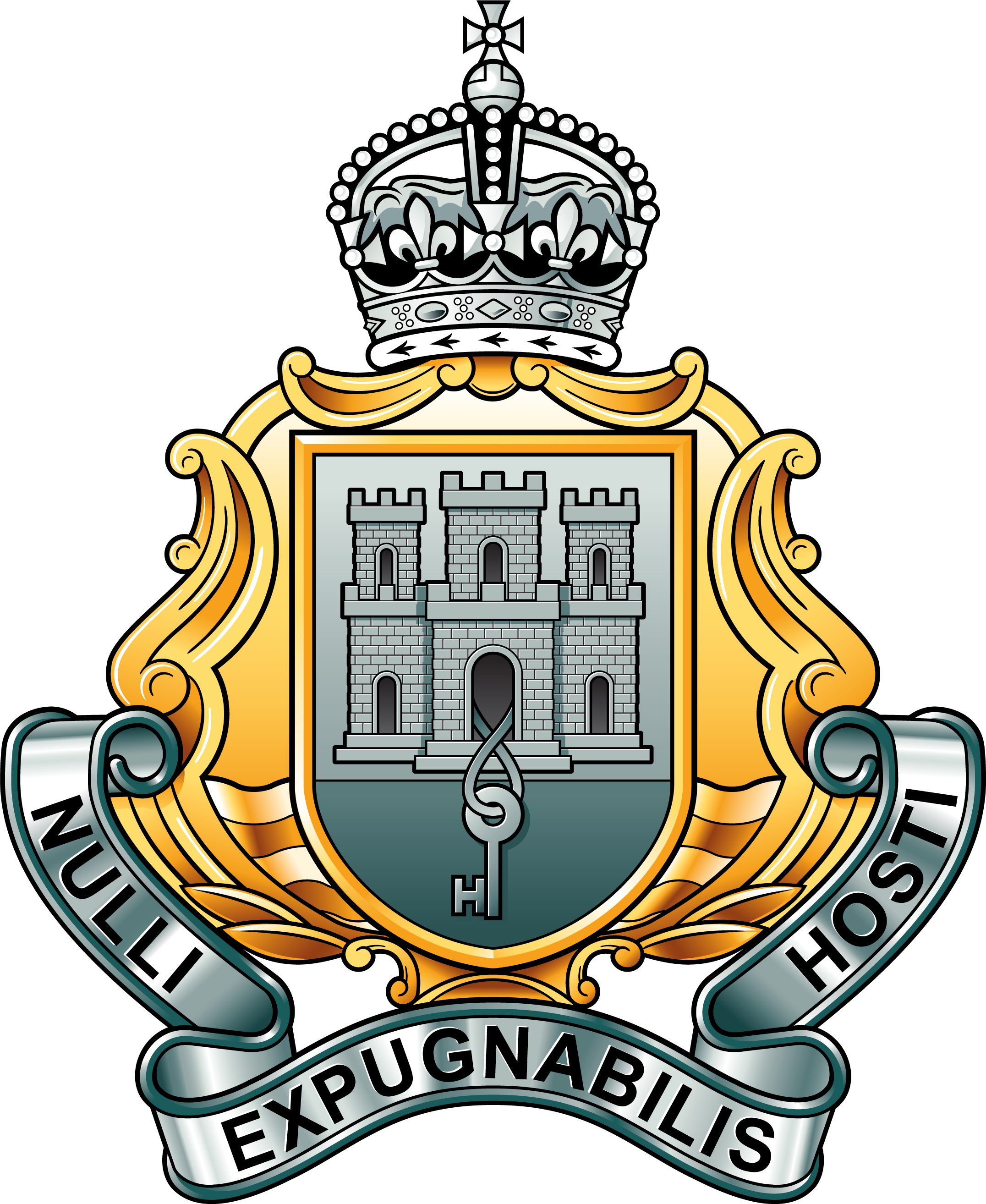
- Cap badge of the Royal Gibraltar Regiment
- Active: April 1958-present
- Country: Gibraltar; United Kingdom
- Branch: British Army
- Type: Line Infantry
- Role: Light Infantry
- Size: Total of 400+ reported as of 2019; 235 reported as of 2023
- Part of: Queen's Division
- Garrison/HQ: Devil's Tower Camp, Gibraltar
- Nickname: The Barbarians
- Mottos: "Nulli expugnabilis hosti" (Latin); Conquered By No Enemy
- Anniversaries: Regimental Day: 28 April
- Engagements: Defence of Gibraltar, 1940-1945
- Website: www.army.mod.uk/who-we-are/corps-regiments-and-units/infantry/royal-gibraltar-regiment/

Commanders
- Colonel-in-Chief: Governor of Gibraltar
- Honorary Colonel: General Sir Patrick Sanders, KCB, CBE, DSO

Insignia
- Tactical Recognition Flash
- Arm Badge: Key of Gibraltar
- Abbreviation: RG

The Royal Gibraltar Regiment is a full time volunteer reserve unit which forms part of British Forces Gibraltar. It was formed in 1958 from the Gibraltar Defence Force as an infantry unit, with an integrated artillery troop. The regiment is included in the British Army as a defence engagement force.

== History ==
=== 18th century ===
The earliest verifiable historical evidence of local civilians enrolled to defend Gibraltar dates to 24 June 1720 and, by 1755, an armed organisation of local men were mounting guard on the picket line from Bayside to Devil's Tower to prevent soldiers from the garrison deserting across to the enemy. These men were known as the Genoese Guard and were disbanded at the end of the Seven Years' War.

During the Great Siege of Gibraltar, 160 local labourers volunteered to take part in the action during the night of 26/27 November 1781. They were tasked with following the advancing troops and assisting in the dismantling and demolition of the Spanish batteries, magazines and trenches.

=== 19th century ===
During the Sudan Campaign 100 local men were deployed by the commissariat as transport drivers, known as Los Carreteros Del Rey (The King's Cart Drivers). The expedition was involved in several battles with the Dervishes. During a parade held in Gibraltar, the cart drivers were awarded the Egyptian War Medal with a clasp bearing the title 'Suakin 1885'.

=== 20th century ===
During the Second Boer War, in 1900, a group of Gibraltarians offered to form a Local Corps of Volunteers. The suggestion was made that some of the Volunteers might be organised as a Rifle Corps. However, the war was over before the Corps was formed.

==== World War I ====
During World War I, a group of local rowing club members volunteered to take up arms. Such was the interest that soon some 400 Gibraltarians joined. One of their tasks was to act as stretcher bearers for the many casualties arriving on hospital ships from Gallipoli. The wounded were taken to the Royal Naval Hospital Gibraltar and a number of temporary hospitals. The volunteers obtained recognition from the governor, General Sir Herbert Miles, on 3 July 1915. Addressing the volunteers at Wellington Front, the governor said that the Corps had "come into being not because of any official demand but as a result of their patriotic fervour and of their love and respect for the Crown".

The Corps was based at Orange Bastion, with its headquarters on the ground floor of what is now City Hall. Later, the group moved to Wellington Front. The volunteers were divided into four rifle companies, A, B, C and D: each was commanded by a captain, with two subalterns, one sergeant major, four sergeants, eight corporals, two buglers and about 80 men. The first commanding officer was Major G B Roberts of the Royal Engineers. During the war, the Corps provided reinforcement to assist in the defence of the Rock. The Corps was disbanded on 1 February 1920.

==== World War II ====
In 1938, the Governor, General Sir Edmund Ironside, formed a Territorial Artillery unit to help man the anti-aircraft guns on Gibraltar. The Volunteers paraded for the first time on 28 April 1939. Just before the outbreak of the war, more volunteers were called for and men were allocated to the 4th and 27th Coast Batteries of the Royal Artillery as well as to the Royal Signals, Royal Army Service Corps and Royal Army Medical Corps.

On 2 September 1939, the Gibraltar Defence Force was mobilised. The Heavy Anti Aircraft section was attached to 19 AA Battery Royal Artillery and deployed with two 3 inch guns to the Admiralty oil tanks, on the east side of the Rock. They fired their first shots in anger on 7 July 1940 and from then on they were often in action against Vichy French and Italian planes, engaging German planes later in the war. They shot down their first enemy aircraft on the night of 20 August 1940. The entry in the unit's War Diary reads as follows:

"Third bombing raid over Gibraltar, first plane came over at 23.30 hours and was picked up by searchlights at the moment of bomb release. It kept a steady course and AA fire was opened. Plane was hit and brought down in the straits".

Early in 1944, the force was reconstituted under the Defence Force Ordinance 1943. The majority of volunteers were placed on the reserve list, with other sections disbanded.

=== Post war ===
On 30 August 1958, the permanent cadre and the reserve of the Gibraltar Defence Force was formed into the Gibraltar Regiment. The regiment then had a dual role, being organised as an infantry battalion with four rifle companies and an artillery troop manning the 9.2 inches (23.4 cm) coastal guns. This organisation was to remain in force until 1971. With the departure of the last gunner unit in 1958, the regiment was issued with four 25 pounder (88 mm) guns and took over the responsibilities of firing Royal Gun Salutes.

On 25 September 1971, the regiment was presented with its first colours. At a ceremony held at the Grand Parade, the Governor, Admiral of the Fleet Sir Varyl Begg, presented the regiment with its colours on behalf of Queen Elizabeth II. On the same day, the regiment was granted the Freedom of the City of Gibraltar by the Mayor of Gibraltar, Alfred Vazquez, during a ceremony outside the House of Assembly.

The artillery battery was named Thomson's Battery on 15 September 1973 in honour of the late Sir Willie Thomson OBE JP; and, in December 1975, Thomson's Battery was issued with three 105mm L5 Pack Howitzers. Following Operation Corporate, the Ministry of Defence decided, in line with its policy of modernisation and commonality of equipment, to re-equip the regiment with new weapons. In late 1982, six 105mm L118 light guns guns replaced the three howitzers and eight Blowpipe surface-to-air missile units replaced the four L40/70 AA Guns.

On 1 April 1991, the regiment was reorganised into an all-infantry unit and took over the duties of the resident infantry battalion. The re-roled regiment consisted of a headquarters company (Thomson's Bty), a military band and three rifle companies of which G and I companies were regular and B Company (and the band) consisted of TA soldiers.

On 1 July 1998, the Duke of Kent presented the regiment with its new colours.

=== 21st century ===
The regiment has supplied officers and men for the conflicts in Northern Ireland, Sierra Leone, Bosnia, Kosovo, Afghanistan and Iraq. It is in these theatres that members of the regiment have been decorated with two Bronze Stars and a Military Cross. The Royal Gibraltar Regiment signed up to the Armed Forces Act 2011 to bring it in line with British Armed Forces. It was signed by Governor of Gibraltar Ed Davis (Royal Marines officer) on board HMS Diamond in 2018 along with Fabian Picardo and Armed Forces Minister Mark Lancaster.

On 31 March 2022 the Royal Gibraltar Regiment was presented with New Colours by HRH the Earl of Wessex at Windsor Castle.

== Structure ==
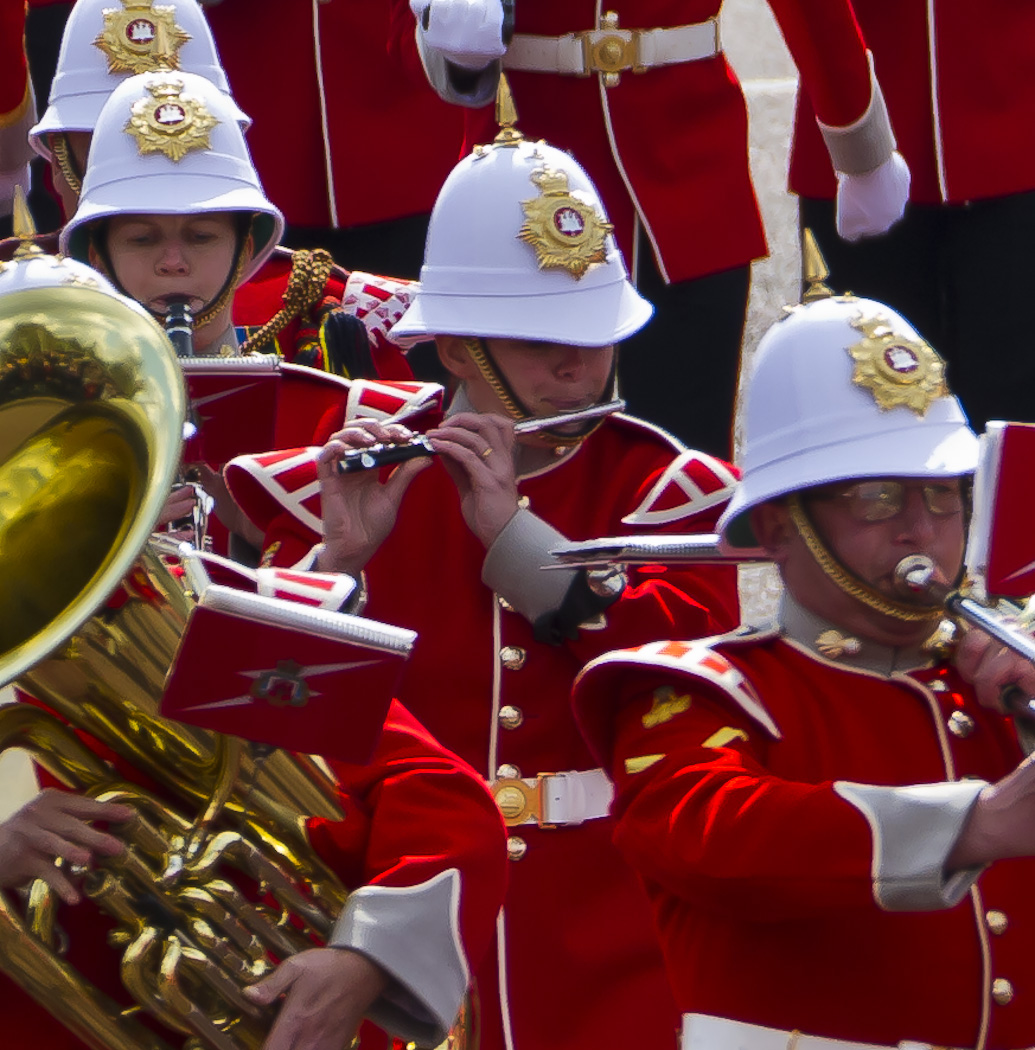
The Band of the Royal Gibraltar Regiment.

Initially a reserve force, on the withdrawal of the British Army garrison from the territory in 1991, the regiment was reorganised into an all-infantry unit and took over the duties of the resident battalion. The re-roled regiment consisted of a headquarters company (Thompson's Battery) and three rifle companies of which B Company is the reserve element with the others being made up of regular soldiers. As of 2023, the regiment was reported to have a strength of 235 personnel, meaning that most component companies and platoons were understrength. Component elements of the regiment consisted of:

- HQ Company (Thomson's Battery, Regular) - made up currently of the Artillery Troop (L118 105mm light guns), Motor Transport Platoon, Signals Wing, Catering Platoon and Clothing Stores.
- G Company (Regular) – comprises three regular rifle platoons.
- I Company (Regular) – a regular rifle company, but also holds the regiment's specialists when fully manned. These are:
  - 2 × recce sections,
  - 5 × sniper pairs,
  - 2 × machine gun sections,
  - 2 × assault pioneer/soldier sections,
  - 2 × high-assurance search teams,
  - 2 × low-risk search teams,
  - The regiment's explosive ordnance disposal teams (EOD)
- B Company (Reserves) consists of three rifle platoons. It also provides two sharpshooter pairs, two machine gun sections and one low-risk search team.

== Role ==
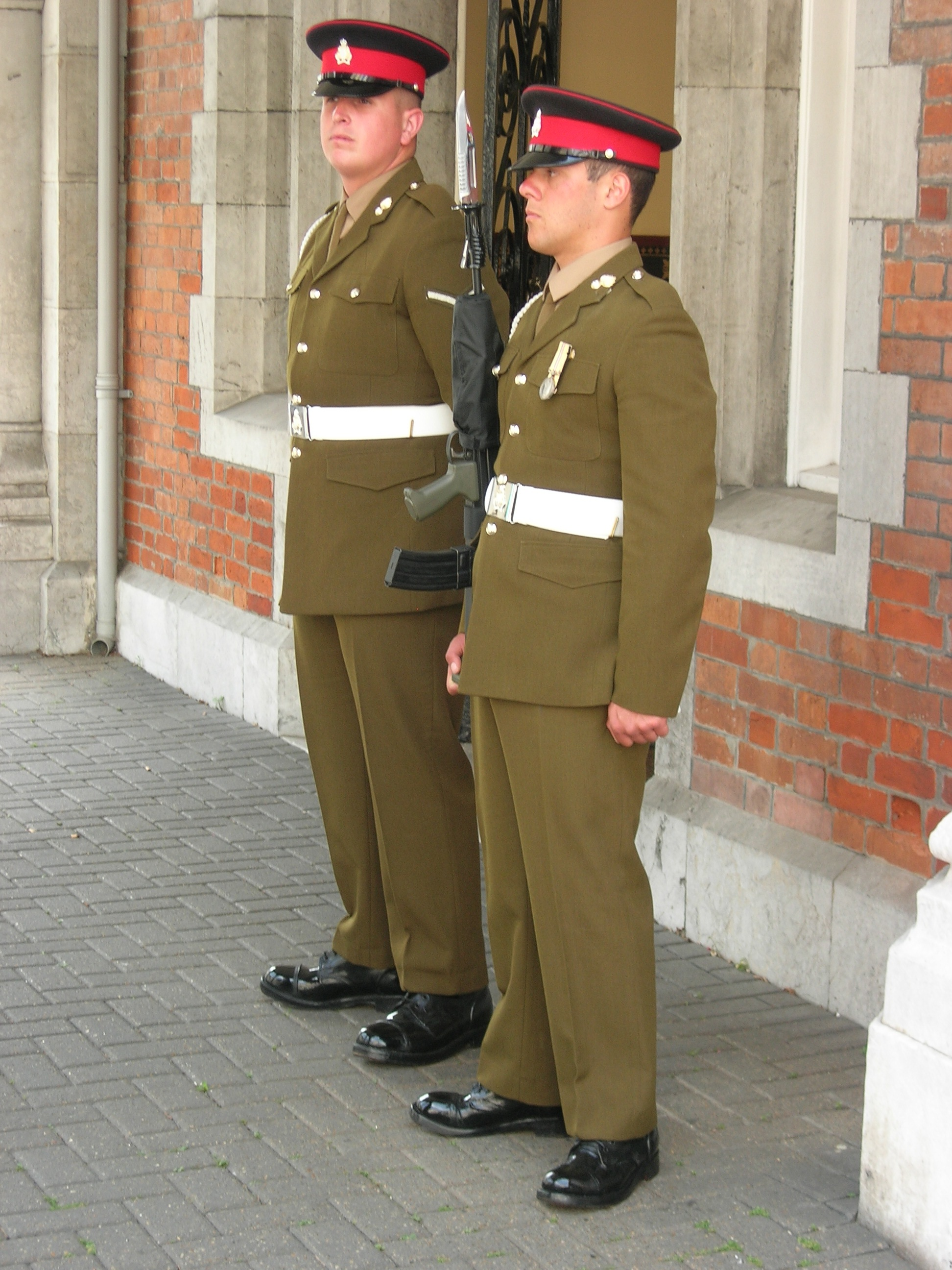
Two soldiers of the Royal Gibraltar Regiment on guard duty at the Governor's residence.

The regiment undertakes army ceremonial tasks in Gibraltar as it is the only major unit based there. It is responsible for the ceremonial guard of the Governor at his residence the Convent, and performing the ceremony of the keys twice a year and the King's Birthday Parade in Casemates Square, as well as any other Guards of Honour. In March 2001, for the first time, the regiment mounted the guard at Buckingham Palace. In addition to this, the regiment has fired three 62 Gun Royal salutes at the Tower of London on the occasion of the Birthday of Her Majesty the Queen, a duty normally carried out by the Honourable Artillery Company. The regiment resumed both roles in April 2012 and returned to London once again in March 2022 for public duties.

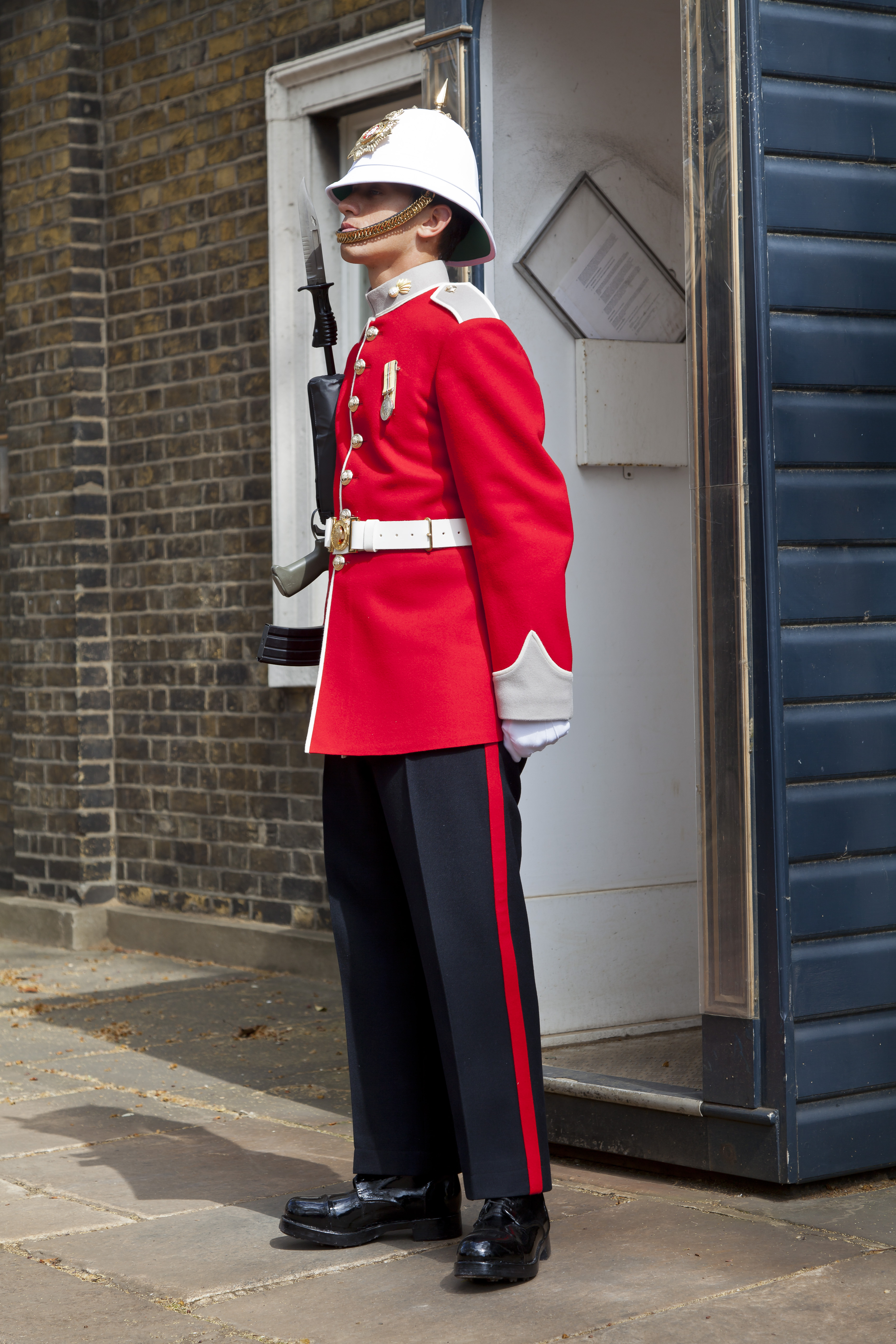
A soldier of the Royal Gibraltar Regiment on ceremonial duty.

== Honorary Regimental Colonels ==
- 1953–: Col. Sir William Thomson
- 1958–: Gen. Sir Charles Frederic Keightley
- 1980–1985: Col. John Joseph Porral
- 1985–1989: Col. Arthur John Ferrary
- 1989–1998: Col. Domingo Louis Collado
- 1993–1999: Col. Sir Robert John Peliza
- 1998–2003: Col. John Joseph Porral
- 2003–2008: Lt-Col. Eddie A. Guerrero
- 2008–2014: Lt-Col. Dennis Duarte
- 2014–2017: Col. The Hon Ernest Michael Britto
- 2017–2025: Col. Francis Brancato
- 2025–present: Gen. Sir Patrick Sanders, KCB, CBE, DSO

== Uniforms ==
For reasons both of climate and ceremonial responsibilities, the regiment is issued with a wider range of uniforms than most other British infantry units. These include:

- full dress (scarlet)
- No 1 Temperate Ceremonial (dark blue)
- No 2 Service Dress (khaki)
- No 3 Warm Weather Ceremonial (white)
- No 6 Warm Weather Parade (bush jacket)

== Image gallery ==
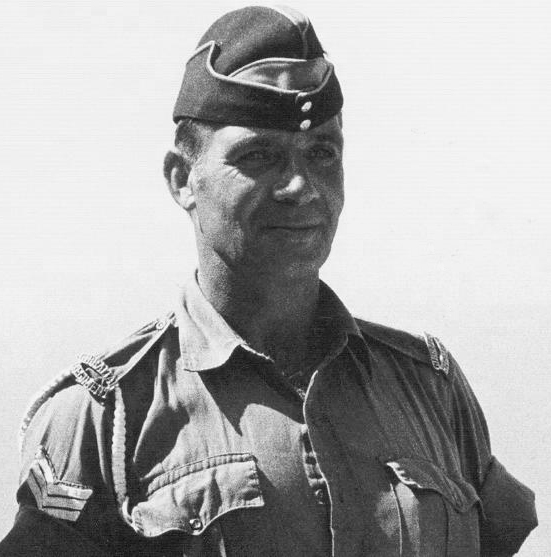
Sgt. Alfred Holmes of the Gibraltar Regiment (1931–1994).

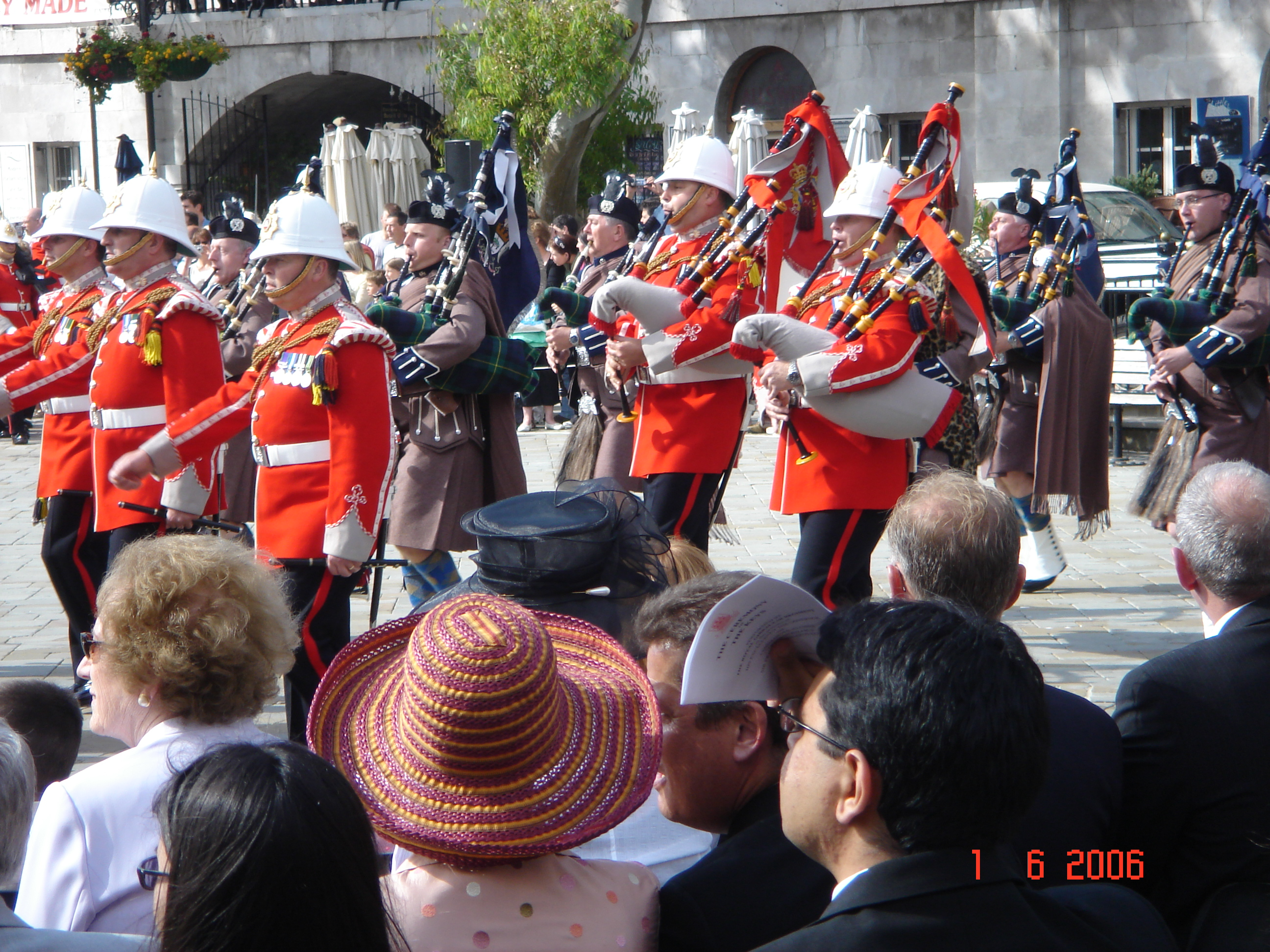
Royal Gibraltar Regiment Band along with pipers from the London Regiment (1993) perform at the Ceremony of the Keys.

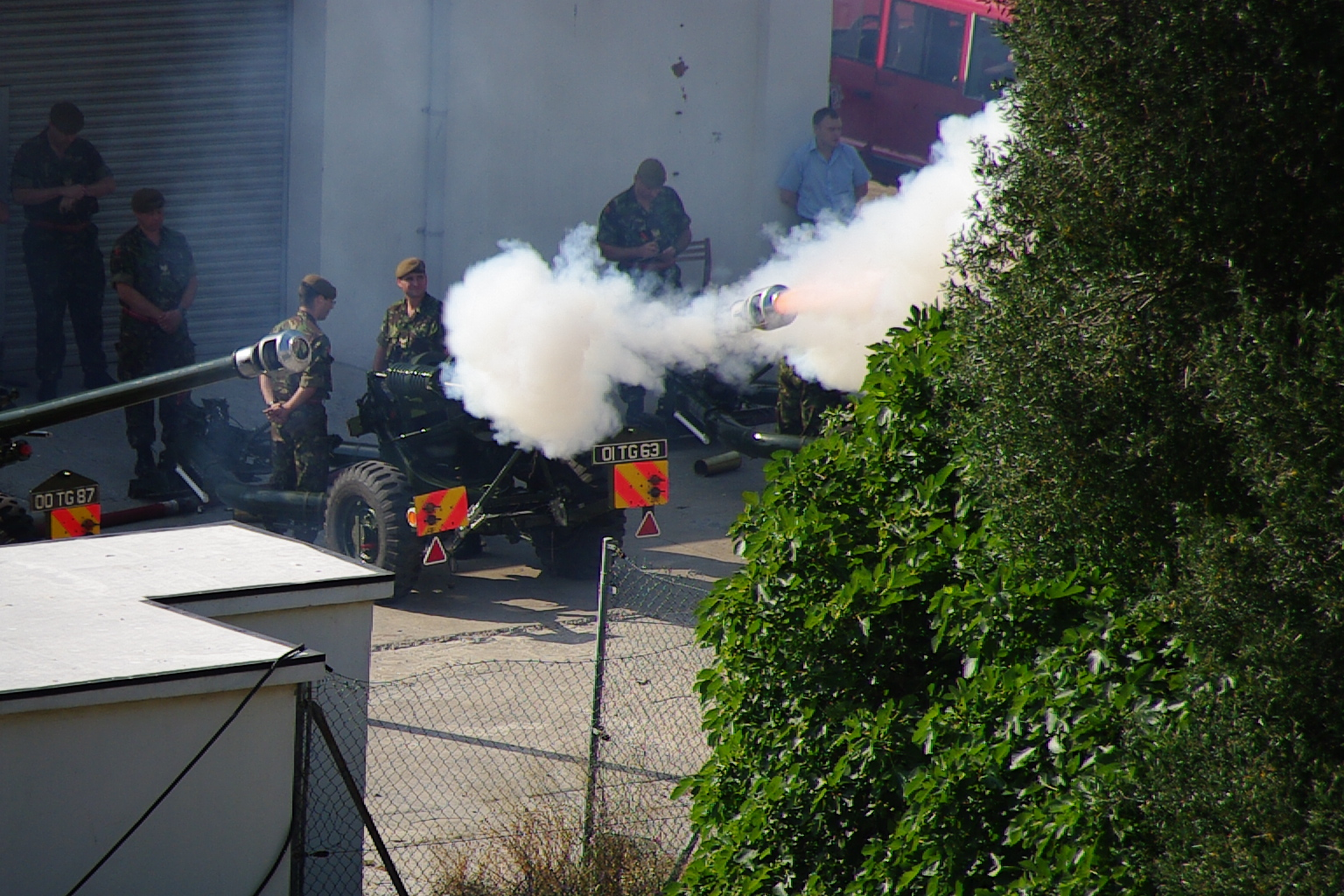
Royal Gibraltar Regiment firing a 21 gun salute on the occasion of the Queen's birthday parade in June 2008.

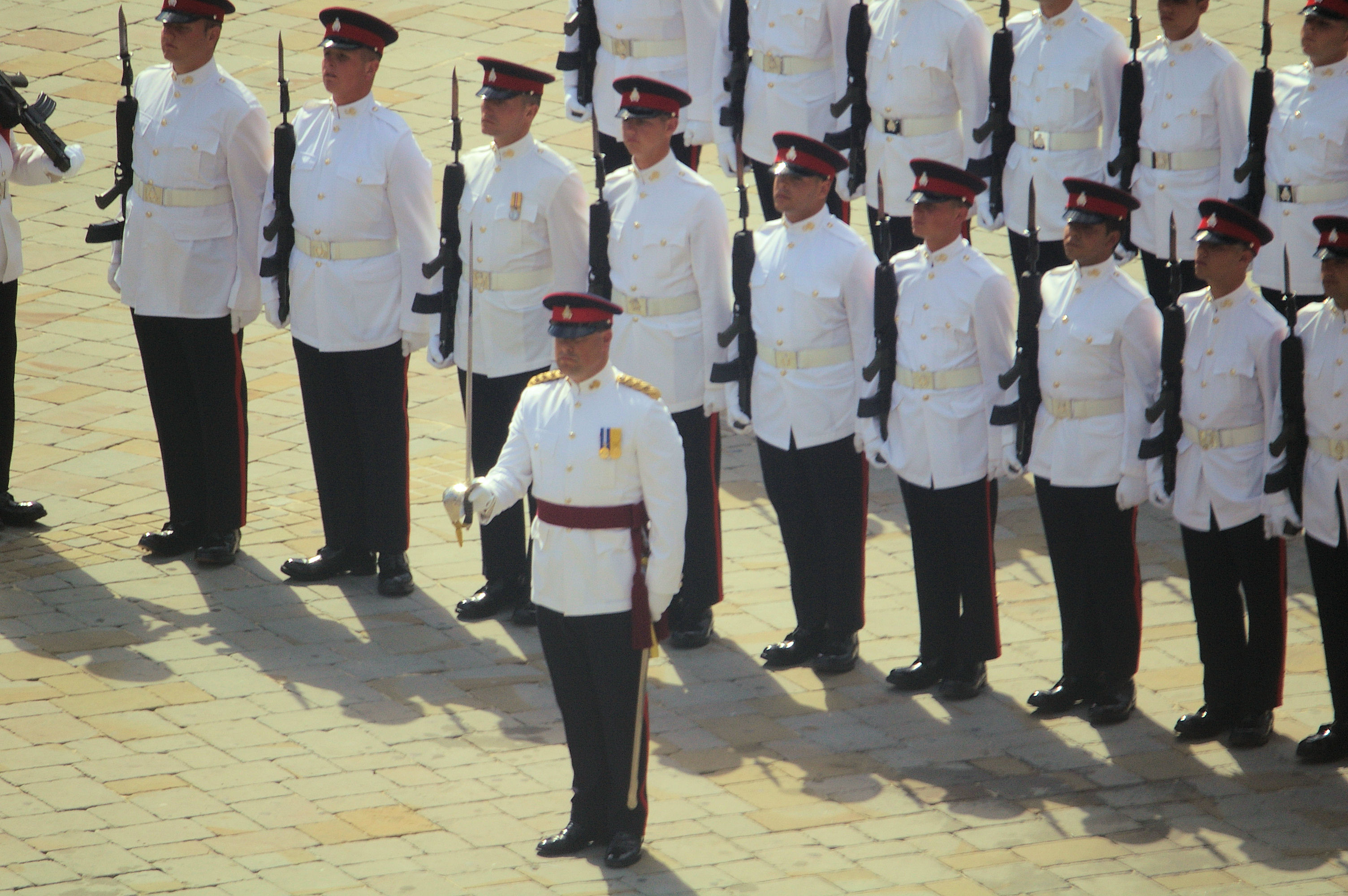
Royal Gibraltar Regiment on parade on the occasion of the Queen's birthday parade in June 2007.

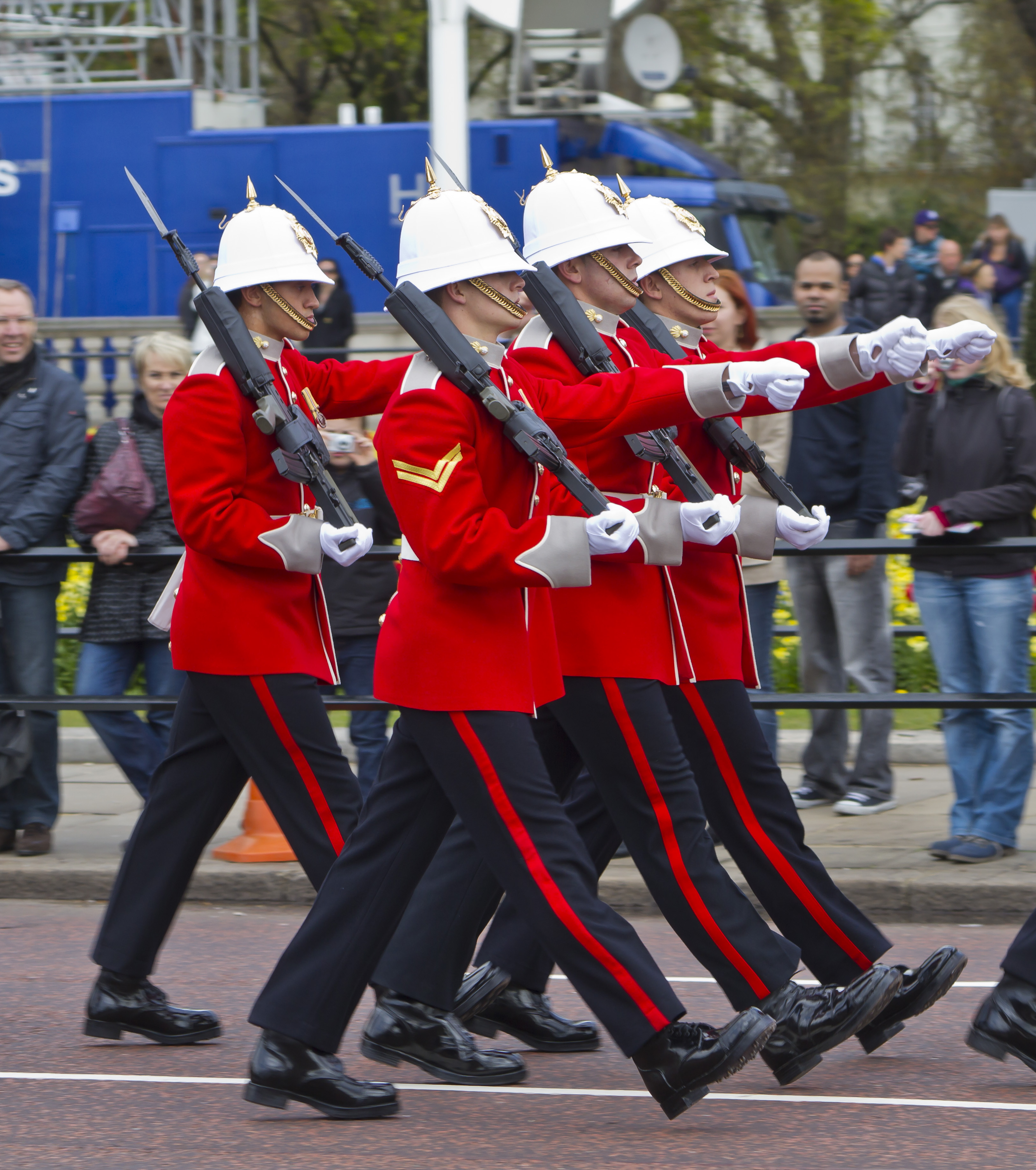
Royal Gibraltar Regiment in London, April 2012.

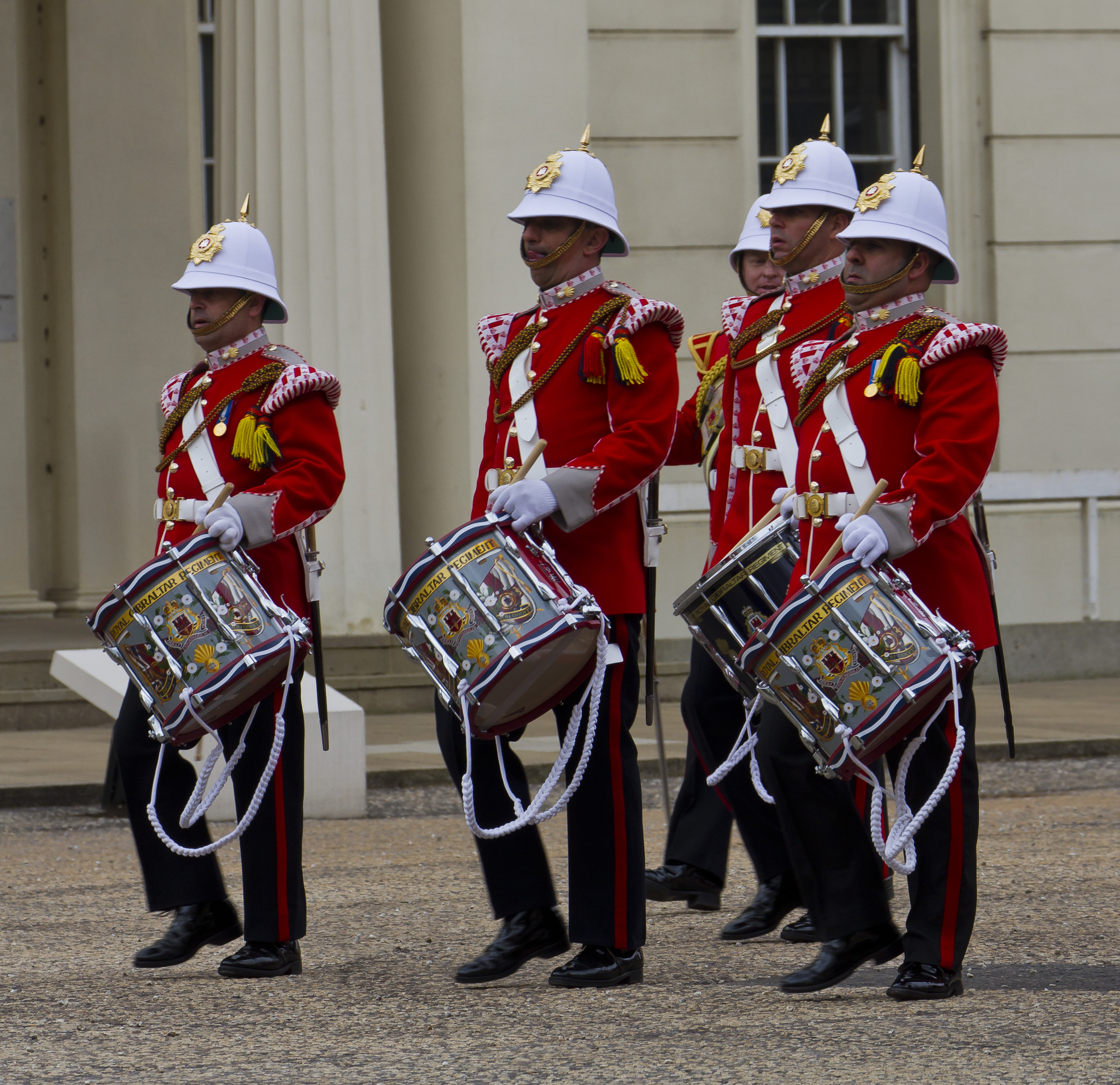
Drummers in London, April 2012.

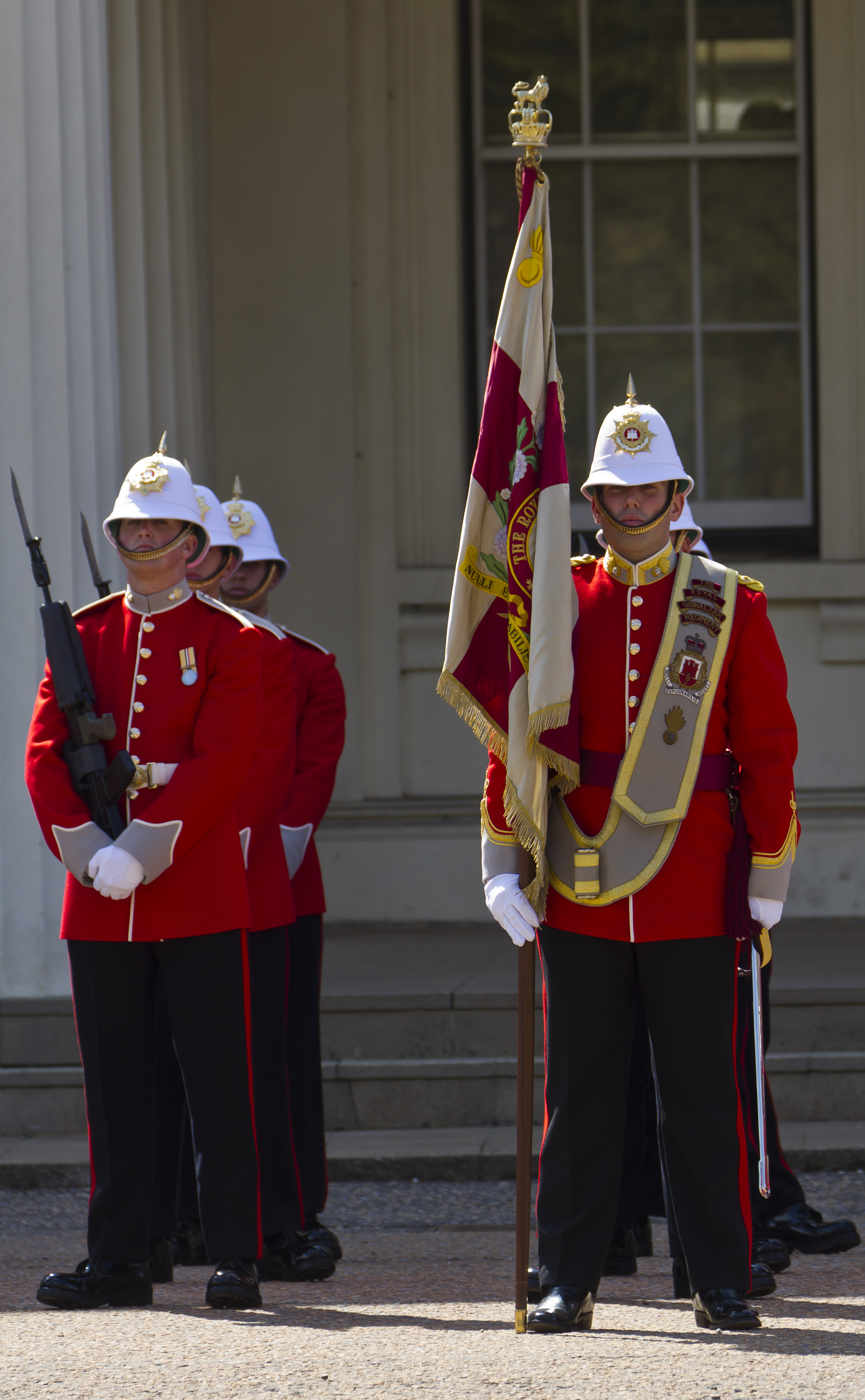
Regimental Colours in London, 2012.

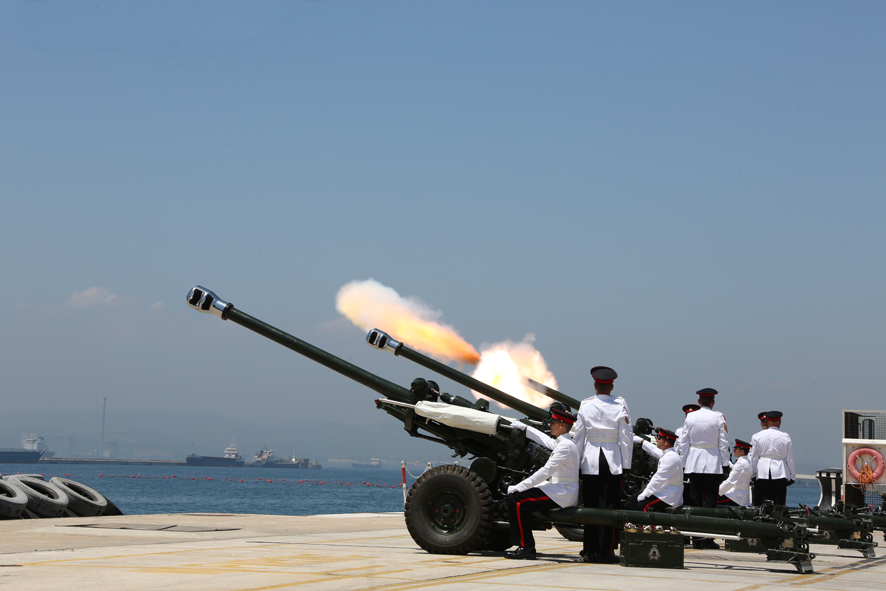
21 Gun Salute in Gibraltar marking the birth of the then-Prince George of Cambridge, 2013.

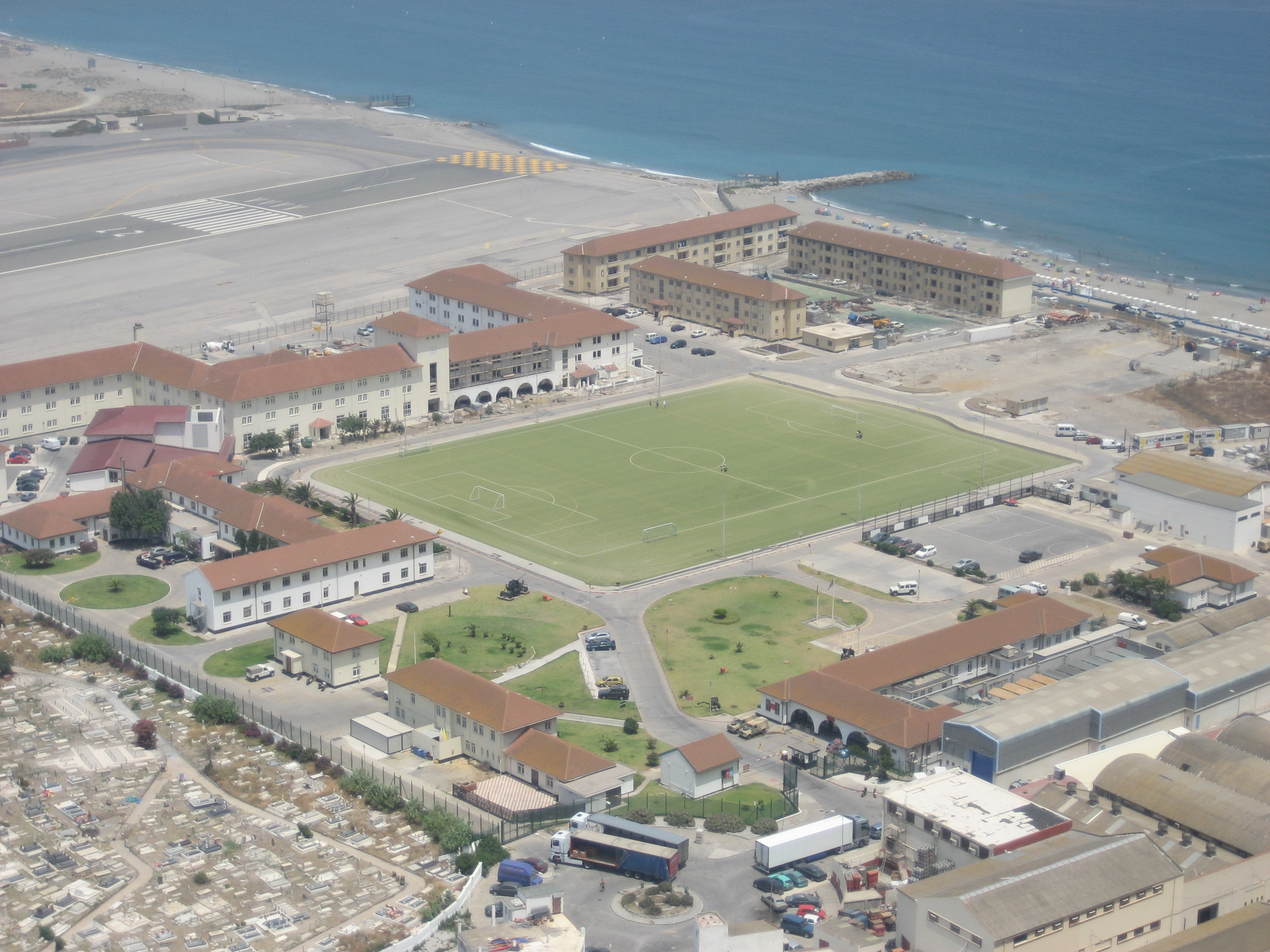
Devil's Tower Camp.

== Order of precedence ==
Preceded by Army Reserve	Order of Precedence	Succeeded by Royal Bermuda Regiment

== See also ==
- The Band and Corps of Drums of the Royal Gibraltar Regiment
- Royal Bermuda Regiment
- Cayman Islands Regiment
- Turks and Caicos Islands Regiment
- Falkland Islands Defence Force
- Royal Montserrat Defence Force
- Royal Hong Kong Regiment
- British Army Training and Support Unit Belize
- Overseas military bases of the United Kingdom

== Alliances ==
- United Kingdom – The Royal Anglian Regiment
- United Kingdom – Royal Regiment of Artillery
- United Kingdom – Corps of Royal Engineers
- United Kingdom – The Royal Irish Regiment (27th (Inniskilling), 83rd, 87th and Ulster Defence Regiment)

Preceded by British Army Reserve	Order of Precedence	Succeeded by Royal Bermuda Regiment
