= West Place of Arms =

- Part of Fortifications of Gibraltar
- Corral Road in Gibraltar
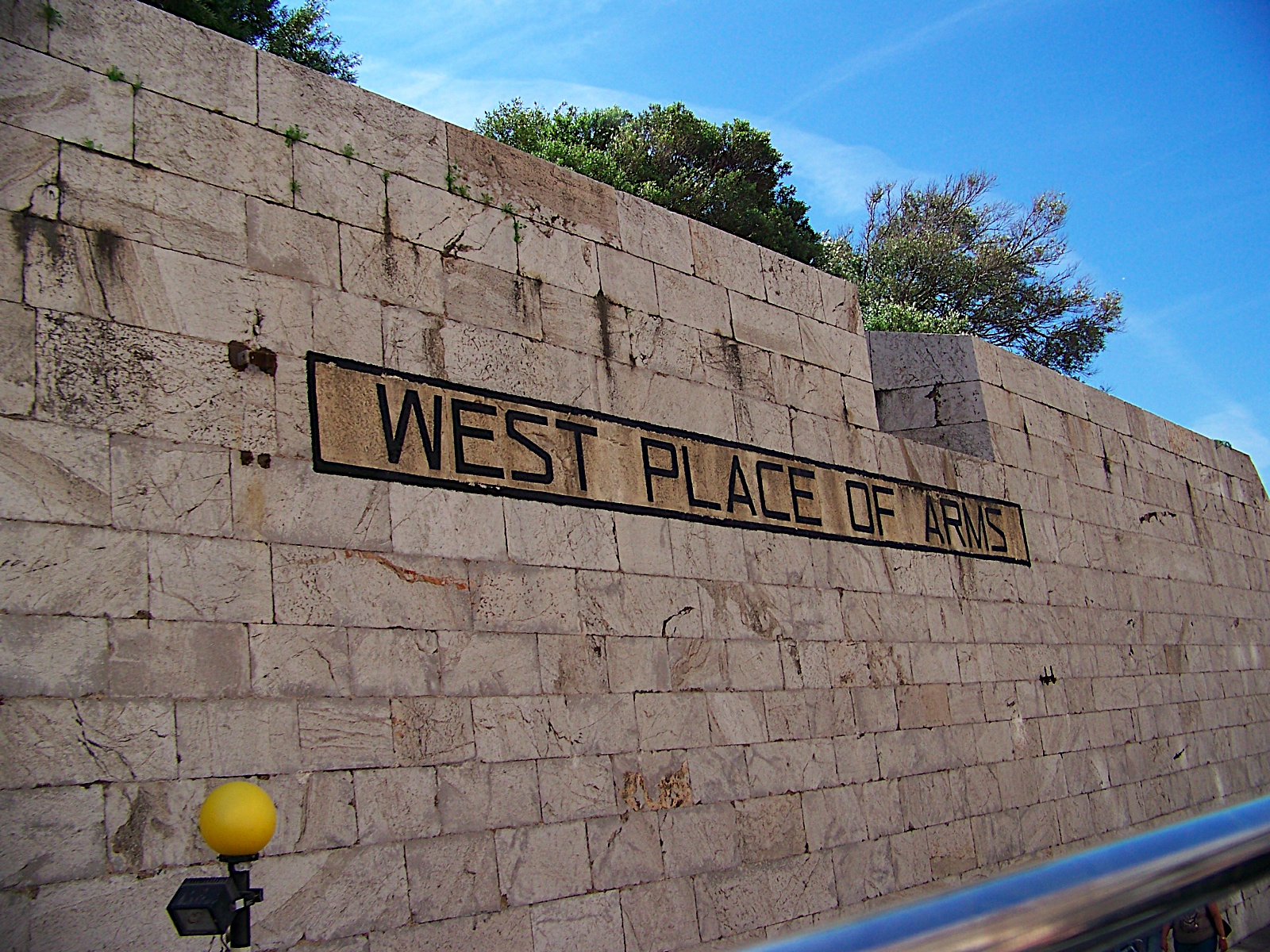
- Sign on the Glacis Road side of West Place of Arms

Site information
- Type: Coastal artillery battery
- Owner: Government of Gibraltar
- Open to the public: Yes
- Condition: Overgrown

Location
- Location within Gibraltar
- Coordinates: 36.146283°N 5.353014°W

Site history
- Built by: UK Ministry of Defence

The West Place of Arms is a place-of-arms in the British Overseas Territory of Gibraltar that was originally used as a troop assembly point. It is located in the gap between the North Bastion and its Counterguard, a structure built in 1804.

The Counterguard provided defensive cover for the West Place of Arms, which was also fortified by a ditch into which a large caponier projected. In 1834 the Counterguard was recorded as being armed with thirteen 24-pdrs and two 9-pdrs. They were replaced by ten 32-pdrs and two 8-inch howitzers between 1859 and 1863. By 1885 there were three 32-pdr smoothbore guns, two 8-inch howitzers and four 64-pdr rifled muzzle loaders (RMLs). The other guns were gradually replaced by RMLs in the final years of the 19th century.
