= Engineer Battery =

Artillery battery in Gibraltar

- Part of Fortifications of Gibraltar
- Gibraltar

Site information
- Type: Artillery battery
- Owner: Ministry of Defence

Location
- Location in Gibraltar
- Coordinates: 36.116667°N 5.35°W

Engineer Battery was an artillery battery in the British Overseas Territory of Gibraltar.

== Description ==
Engineer Battery was at the southern end of the Line Wall Curtain which starts at the North Bastion. The battery was at the end of what was the fortification wall for the western coast of the town which protected it from bombardment by ships in the Bay of Gibraltar. The Line Wall Curtain, as it stands, was built by the British in the 18th century running north–south as part of the Line Wall western defenses. In 1859 there was just one gun at the Engineer Battery guarding the northern edge of Rosia Bay and two nearby magazines. but by 1897 the battery had three 12 pounder QF guns.
