= Capital punishment in Gibraltar =

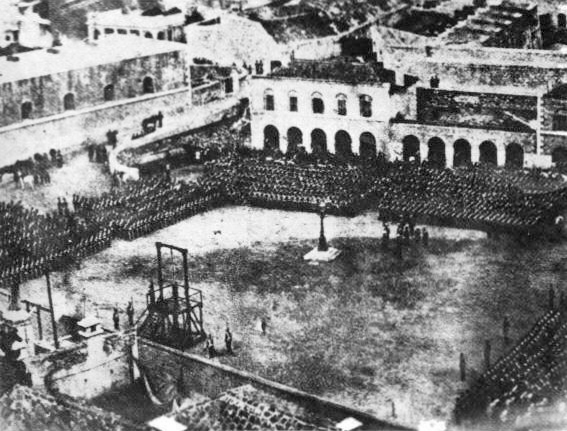
The last public military execution in Gibraltar held at Grand Casemates Square in 1864, with the garrison drawn up to witness the hanging.

Capital punishment in Gibraltar included public execution in the nineteenth century until 1864. The last sentence of death was passed in 1952. Under British law, capital punishment was almost abolished in 1965, in line with British practice. It was entirely abolished in 2002 along with all other British Overseas Territories.

== History ==
During the 18th and 19th centuries a gallows was accessible from within the 18th century tunnels inside Willis' Gallery in the northeastern part of the Rock of Gibraltar. The nearest entrance to this part of the tunnel system is by Princess Anne's Battery. The gallows and floggings were administered in sight of the Spanish troops who manned the Spanish Lines across the isthmus (the Spanish fortifications were later dismantled).

Prior to the foundation of the Alameda Gardens in 1816, its location (the Grand Parade, an assembly ground situated to the south of the town, beyond Southport Gates) was the place of public executions. During the 19th century, public military hangings were carried out at Grand Casemates Square, with the last one held in 1864.

Subsequent hangings took place at the HM Prison Moorish Castle.

Gibraltar's last hanging for murder took place on 3 July 1931 when 31-year-old Ernest Opisso went to the gallows. He was executed for the murder of his employer in the flat above her shop where they both worked. It was the first execution in Gibraltar since 1896.

=== World War II ===
Two Spaniards from La Línea de la Concepción recruited by the German intelligence service, the Abwehr, 23-year-old Luis López Cordón Cuenca and 19-year-old José Martín Muñoz, were hanged on 11 January 1944 for offences committed during World War II. The hangings were carried out by famous British hangman Albert Pierrepoint, who had travelled undercover to Gibraltar to carry out the executions.

== Post-war ==
Barring two exceptions, capital punishment was almost completely abolished in Gibraltar on 8 November 1965, in line with British practice. However, death sentences were last passed in Gibraltar in 1952.

== 2000s ==
In 2001, Gibraltar still retained capital punishment for treason and piracy. However, capital punishment was abolished in 2002, when the death penalty was outlawed under all circumstances in all the British Overseas Territories.

== See also ==
- History of Gibraltar
