= North Bastion, Gibraltar =

Fortification in Gibraltar

North Bastion
- Part of Fortifications of Gibraltar
- Gibraltar
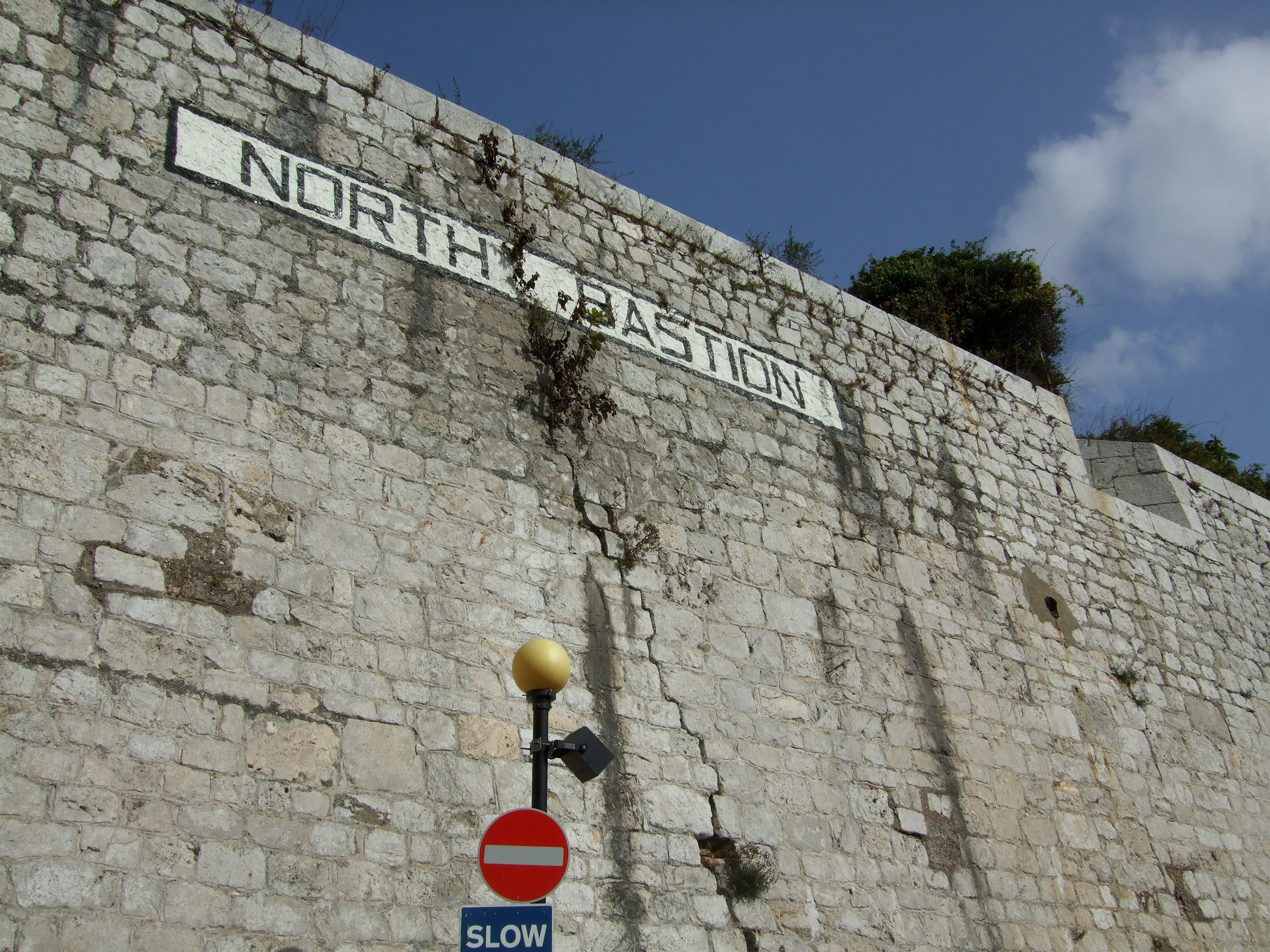
- Western façade of the North Bastion

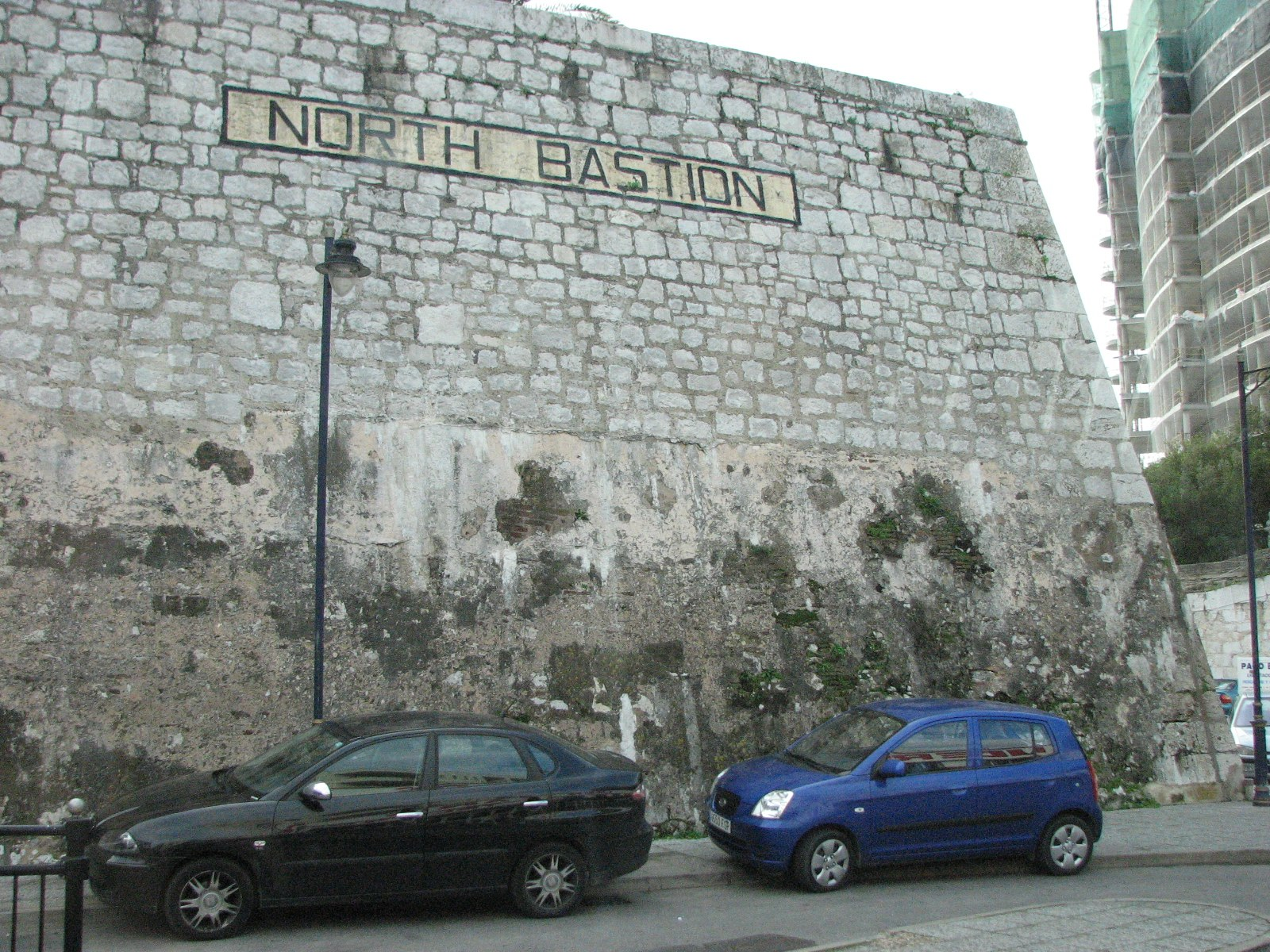
- Northern facade of the North Bastion showing its older Spanish and Moorish construction at its base

Site information
- Owner: Government of Gibraltar
- Open to the public: Yes

Location
- Coordinates: 36.145904°N 5.352799°W

Site history
- Built by: Philip II of Spain

The North Bastion, formerly the Baluarte San Pablo (St. Paul's Bastion) was part of the fortifications of Gibraltar, in the north of the peninsula, protecting the town against attack from the mainland of Spain. The bastion was based on the older Giralda tower, built in 1309. The bastion, with a mole that extended into the Bay of Gibraltar to the west and a curtain wall stretching to the Rock of Gibraltar on its east, was a key element in the defenses of the peninsula. After the British took Gibraltar in 1704 they further strengthened these fortifications, flooding the land in front and turning the curtain wall into the Grand Battery.

Today, the bastion is surrounded by reclaimed land to the west and north. Glacis Road runs along the base of the bastion's former glacis. Smith Dorrien Avenue separates the bastion from the curtain wall, which is still largely intact. The bastion is occupied by the Giralda Gardens and a pétanque club. The Government of Gibraltar has plans to rehabilitate the site as part of a plan to develop the old fortifications as tourist attractions.

== Background ==
Gibraltar is accessible by land only along a narrow isthmus overlooked by the Rock, which is too steep to be climbed on its east and north sides. The only entrance to Gibraltar is via the west side of the Rock. A Moorish town occupied the strip of land along the west of the peninsula between the sea and the Rock. The northern approaches to the town were defended by a castle on the slopes of the rock, from which walls built in the Middle Ages ran down to the shore of the Bay of Gibraltar.

A tower was built at the end of the wall by the Spanish after Ferdinand IV of Castile took Gibraltar from the Moors in 1309. The Spanish built an arsenal where the Grand Casemates barracks now stand, and the Giralda tower where the North Bastion would later stand. The tower was built on Ferdinand's orders to protect the dockyard, although improvements to other defenses were neglected. In 1333 the Moors retook Gibraltar after a lengthy siege, and the Spanish under Alfonso XI of Castile were unable to recapture it. Portillo describes the Giralda tower as "a redoubt of very great strength and capable of containing sufficient numbers to defend the place, as was seen in the year 1333 when besieged by King Alfonso." The Spanish finally took Gibraltar in August 1462.

A mole extending into the bay from a location just south of the tower provided shelter for trading vessels. The Moors built a wall along the bay south from the tower, which the Spanish later improved and the British further fortified. The Moors built their galleys in a building behind the tower, and launched them through a large arch in the sea wall, later closed. Later the Grand Casemates Gates, formerly called the Waterport Gate, provided access to the town through the wall that ran along the bay. Vessels landing at the wharves by the old mole could gain entry through these fortified gates just south of the North Bastion.

== Construction ==
The Italian Engineer Giovan Giacomo Paleari Fratino was commissioned by Philip II of Spain to improve the defenses of Gibraltar in the 1560s. Among other works he converted the tower into a bastion. The foot of the glacis in front of the north bastion, and part of the curtain wall leading towards the Rock, was washed by the water of the bay. Further improvements to the northern defenses were made by the British after they took Gibraltar in 1704. They mounted guns along the land front curtain wall, calling this the Grand Battery, and mounted more guns on the old mole, which extended into the sea near the North Bastion. Between 1731 and 1734 the area in front of the land wall, which had been a marsh, was excavated to a depth of 2 feet (0.61 m) lower than lower-water level in the bay.

An account of the Great Siege of Gibraltar (1779–83) described the fortifications at that time. Entrance by land was then along a narrow causeway that could be raked by fire from artillery on the old mole and in the Grand Battery. The sea line south of the Grand Battery was defended by the "line wall", a curtain wall that linked five bastions: North Bastion, Montagu Bastion, Orange Bastion, King's Bastion and South Bastion. Montague's, Prince of Orange's and Kings had recently been erected by the British. Around that time the North Bastion was described as "...anciently a square Moorish tower: it still retains the same form, except the parapet in front, which is made of tapia, with four embrasures mounted in the face towards the enemy, three towards the sea, three in the flank next the ditch, and three on the flank next Water port."

== History ==
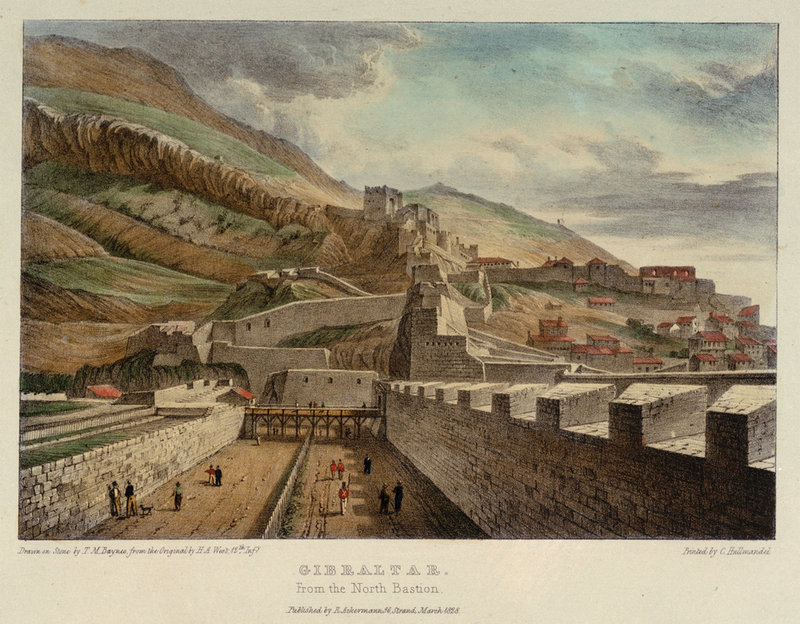
Gibraltar from the North Bastion in 1828. The bastion jutted out from the curtain wall defending the town, which is to the right of the picture behind the ditch.

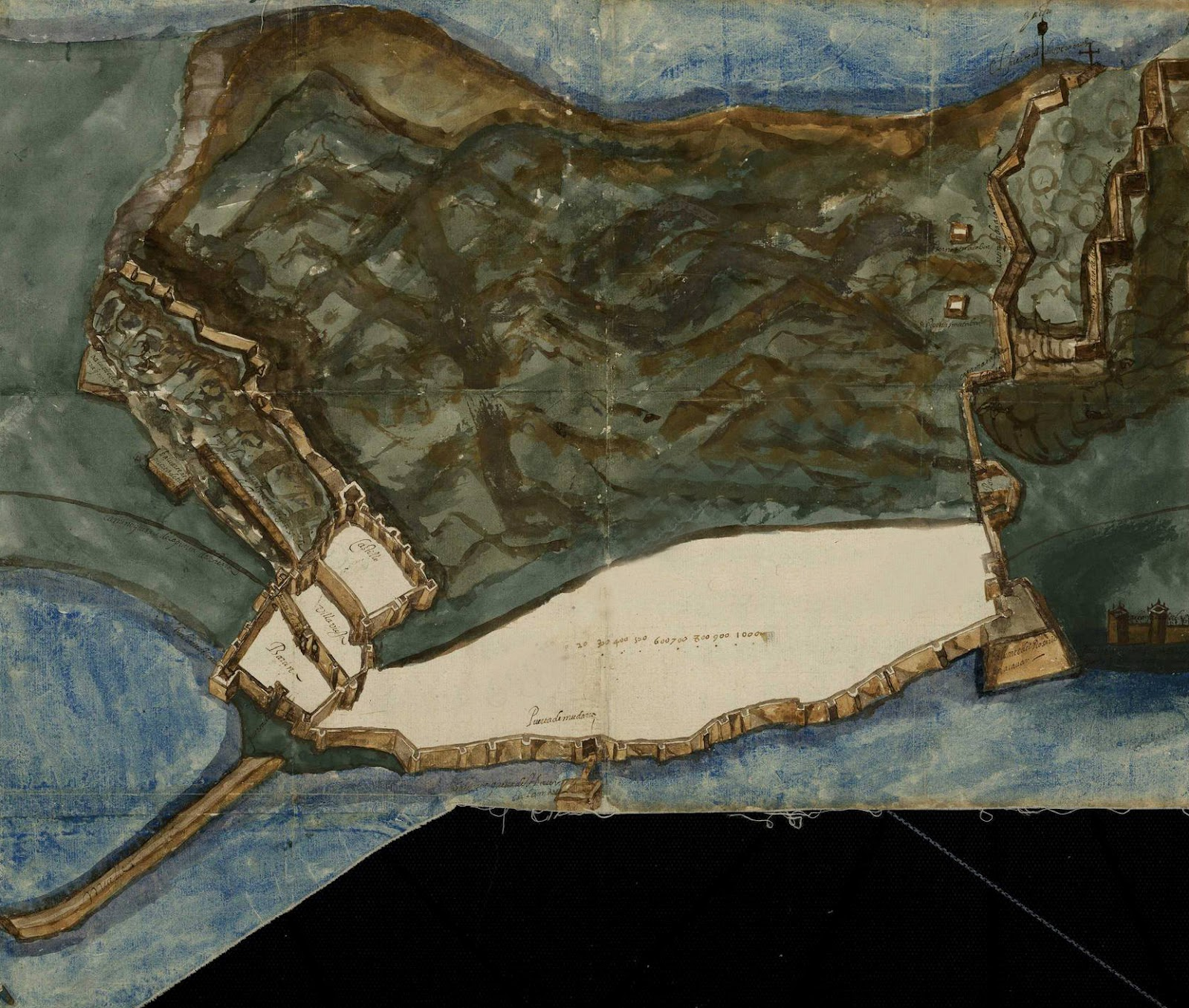
Fortifications of Gibraltar in 1597. The old mole, extending into the bay, is in the lower left. The bastion is the square structure above the base of the mole at the angle between the bay wall and the northern land defenses (north is to the left in this map).

A combined British and Dutch force under the British Admiral Sir George Rooke and Prince George of Hesse-Darmstadt attacked the Rock on 1 August 1704, and the outnumbered and outgunned garrison surrendered on 4 August 1704. A Franco-Spanish army reached the Rock in early September 1704 and began a siege in October. Governor Henry Nugent was mortally wounded on 9 November 1704 at San Pablo Battery (North Bastion). The English received reinforcements, and in March 1705 the siege was lifted.

The bastion was an important position during the Siege of Gibraltar of 1727. During this siege the attack was directed only against the Rock's north front and defenses. These defenses consisted of the Land Port curtain wall defended by Willis' Battery, the Castle Battery, North Bastion and guns on the old mole. Most of the British artillery was old and in poor condition: more deaths were caused to the British by their own guns bursting than by fire from the Spanish.

By the end of February the Spanish had brought forward siege works, but were exposed to fire from the British defenses and also from above, since small mines exploded at the top of the Rock sent showers of stone into the Spanish trenches. By mid-March the North Bastion was suffering from heavy fire from a 12-gun position close to the Rock. At the end of April the bastion was still subject to heavy fire from the Spanish batteries, with three guns dismounted on the 30th. In the end, it proved impossible for the Spanish to break through the fortifications. On 23 June 1727 a truce was agreed, and a peace treaty was signed in 1729 after long negotiations.

At the start of the Great Siege of Gibraltar (June 1779 – 7 February 1783), engineers built a "cavalier" (elevated firing platform) for five guns within the north bastion, by then considered a part of the Grand Battery.

== Today ==
Before 1999, the site of the Giralda Tower was partly an unkept garden, and is now used by the Gibraltar Petanque Association.

The association has about 80 members. Its premises at the Giralda Gardens on the city wall have four floodlit pistes.

The Government of Gibraltar had plans to improve access to the Northern Defences as part of an effort to better exploit the tourist potential of the historical defence work. The plan included making the gardens more attractive and accessible and providing historical interpretation of the site. The Giralda Tower site, across the road from the Grand Battery, would link tours of the northern and western defences.
