= Grand Casemates Square =

Square in Gibraltar

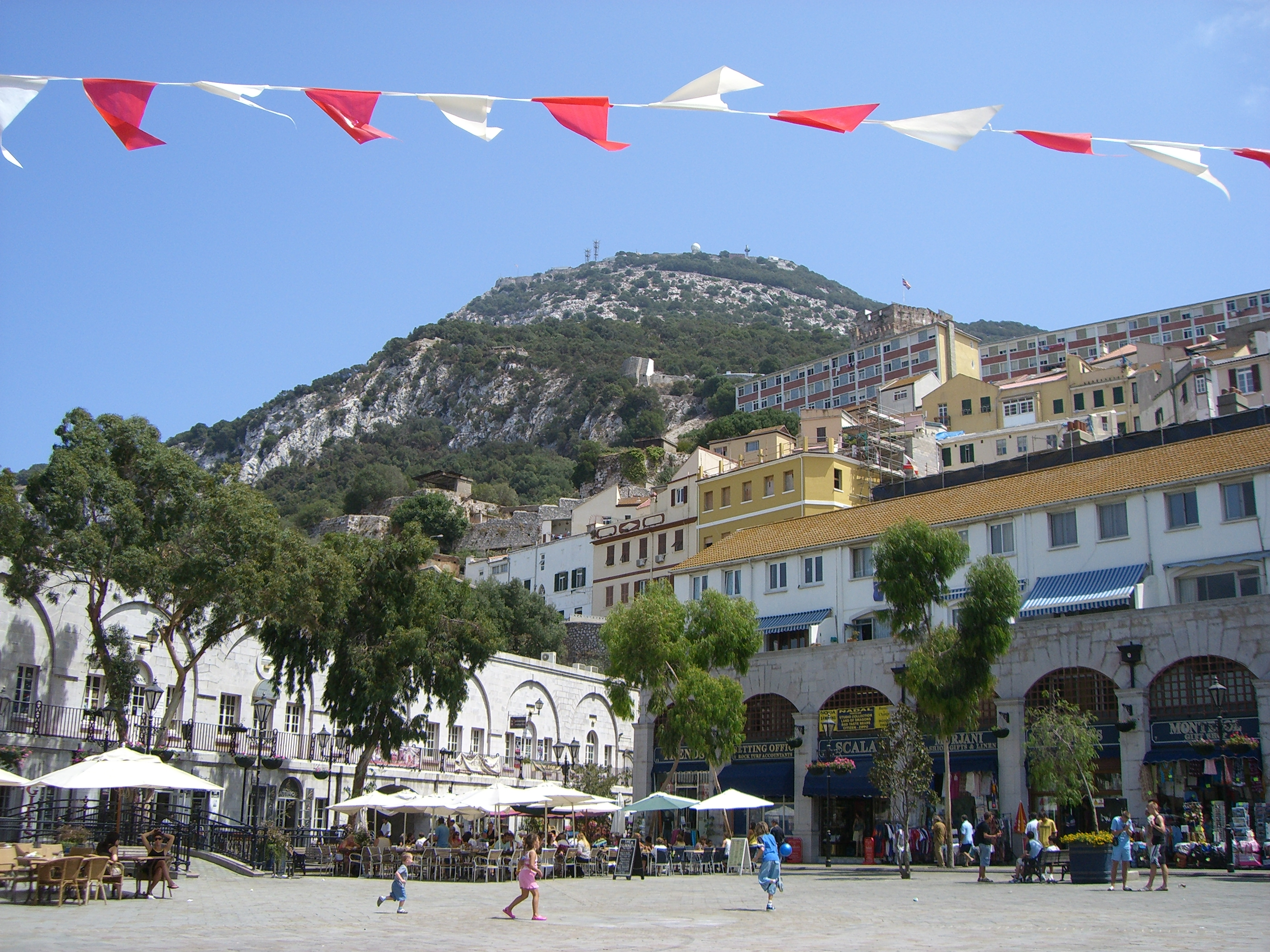
- View of Grand Casemates Square, looking northeast towards the Rock of Gibraltar (2007).
- Interactive map of Grand Casemates Square
- Former names: La Barcina, La Esplanada
- Owner: Government of Gibraltar
- Location: Gibraltar
- Coordinates: 36.1448°N 5.3528°W

Grand Casemates Square (colloquially Casemates Square or Casemates) is the larger of the two main squares within the city centre of Gibraltar (the other being John Mackintosh Square). The square takes its name from the British-built Grand Casemates, a casemate and bombproof barracks at the northern end of the square completed in 1817.

Located at the northern end of Main Street, the square is lined with numerous pubs, bars and restaurants and acts as the gateway into Gibraltar's city centre for most tourists.

== History ==
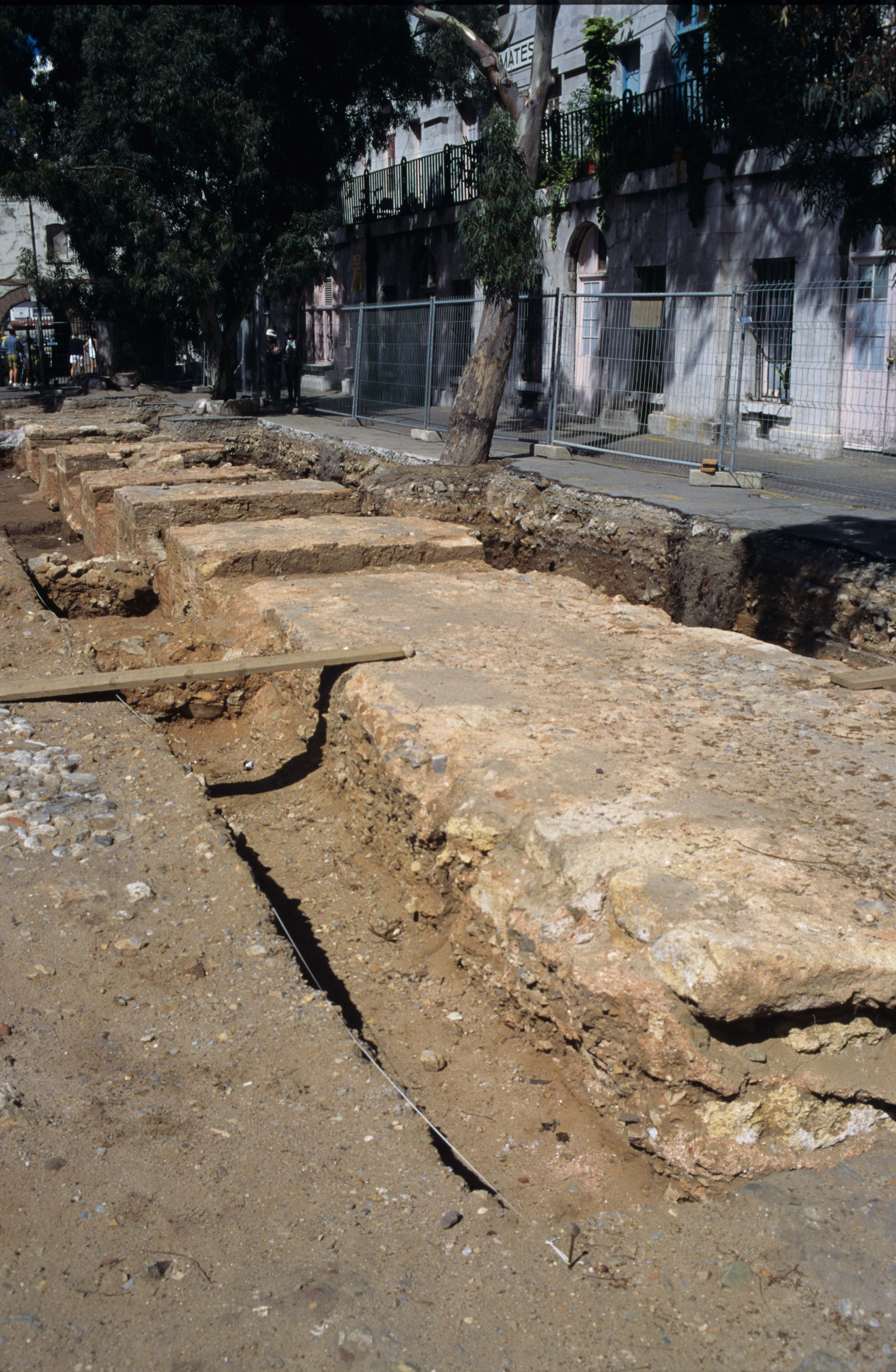
Archaeological finds at Grand Casemates Square in the 1990s, included remains of what are believed to be the foundations of a 14th-century galley house.

Grand Casemates Square dates back to Gibraltar's Moorish period when the place was first fortified, making it as old as the city itself.

=== Moorish period ===
The square is built on sand that was once a beach. In May 1160 Moroccans sent by the Almohad ruler Abd al-Mu'min landed to lay the foundations of the first substantial settlement. This "City of Victory" (Medinat al-Fath) was small and included the area within the Moorish Castle and the land just below. It was this new ruler who changed the name of the rock to Jabal al-Fath meaning Mount of Conquest.

This land was an intertidal zone used by the Muslims to beach their galleys. After the Siege of Gibraltar in 1309, Ferdinand IV of Castile gave orders that a galley house be built where his ships could be repaired. This house gradually sank into the sand over the next few centuries.

=== Spanish period ===
In the late 15th century a gate in the wall near Water Gate was opened to let galleys in. The building of the Old Mole in the 1570s led to the passage silting and the galley house became unusable.

The area of Grand Casemates Square formed part of the old town Spanish: Villa Vieja during Spanish times, being walled with its own gates and towers. Early 17th century plans refer to this area as La Barcina.

=== British period ===
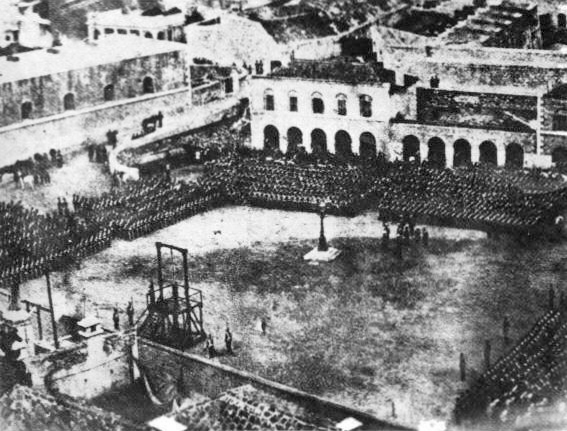
The last public military execution in Gibraltar held at Grand Casemates Square in 1864, with the garrison drawn up to witness the hanging.

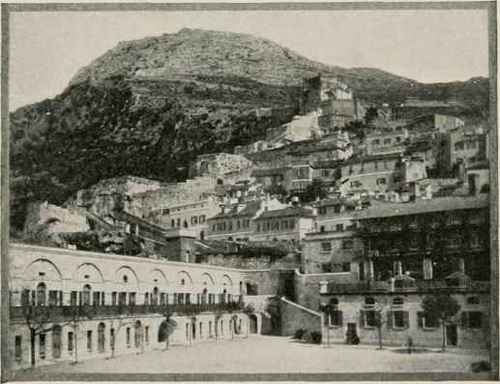
A view of Casemates Square by John Lawson Stoddard in 1901

Following the problems the Spanish faced with the buildings sinking into the soft wet ground, the British began to construct fortress walls and battlements on higher, more solid ground. In 1770, chief engineer William Green began preparatory work for the construction of Grand Casemates as bombproof barracks on the square's northern flank. However, its construction was not started until after the Great Siege of 1779-1783 and it was finished in 1817 under the governorship of General Sir George Don.

After the Great Siege the British decided to demolish most buildings within the square which had suffered great damage. This opened up the area into an esplanade which could be used for public events such military parades and public executions.

==== Capital punishment ====
Grand Casemates Square was once the site of public military hangings, with the last one being held in 1864.

==== Archaeology ====
Following excavations during the refurbishment of the square in the 1990s, archeological remains of a galley house were unearthed. These foundations are still on display in the square.

==== 21st century ====
Nowadays Grand Casemates Square has become a commercial hub housing numerous pubs, bars, restaurants and shops following the refurbishment of the square in the 1990s to replace a car park which occupied half the square. The square is also used to host various cultural events from live open-air concerts, to National Day celebrations. In 2012 the square was host to celebration for Elizabeth II's Diamond Jubilee celebration which was attended by the Earl and Countess of Wessex.

== Monuments ==
Monuments found within the square include:

- Gibraltar Defence Force
- Koehler gun

== Notable fortifications in Grand Casemates Square ==
- Grand Casemates
- Grand Casemates Gates

== See also ==
- Main Street, Gibraltar
- John Mackintosh Square

== Gallery ==
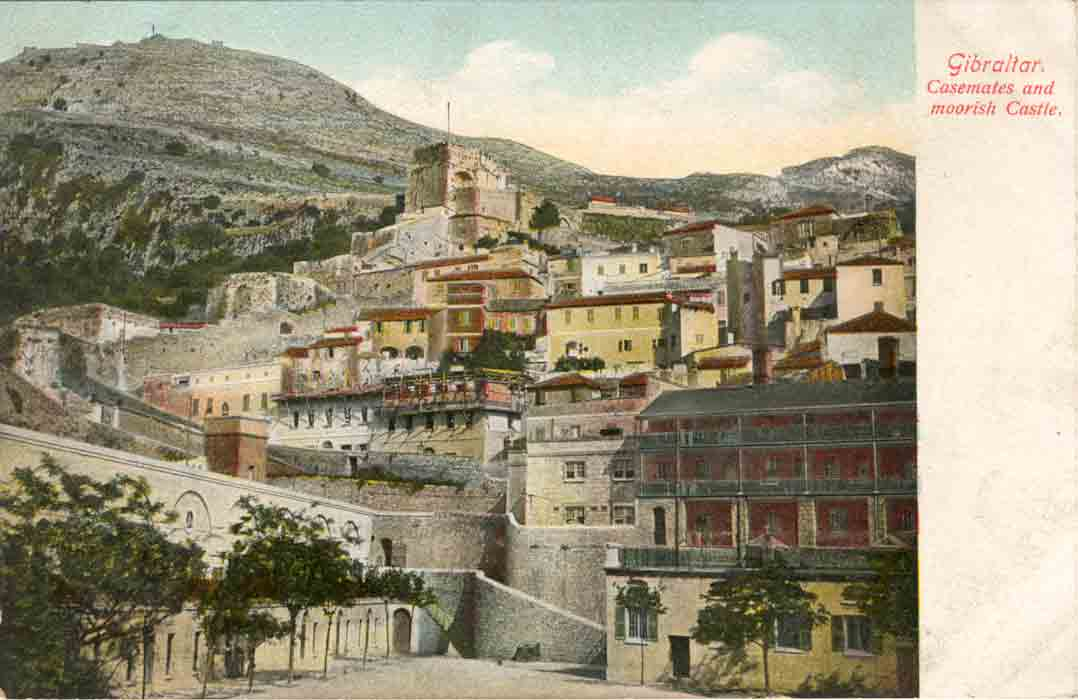
Old postcard of Gibraltar depicting Grand Casemates Square and the Moorish Castle, 1909.

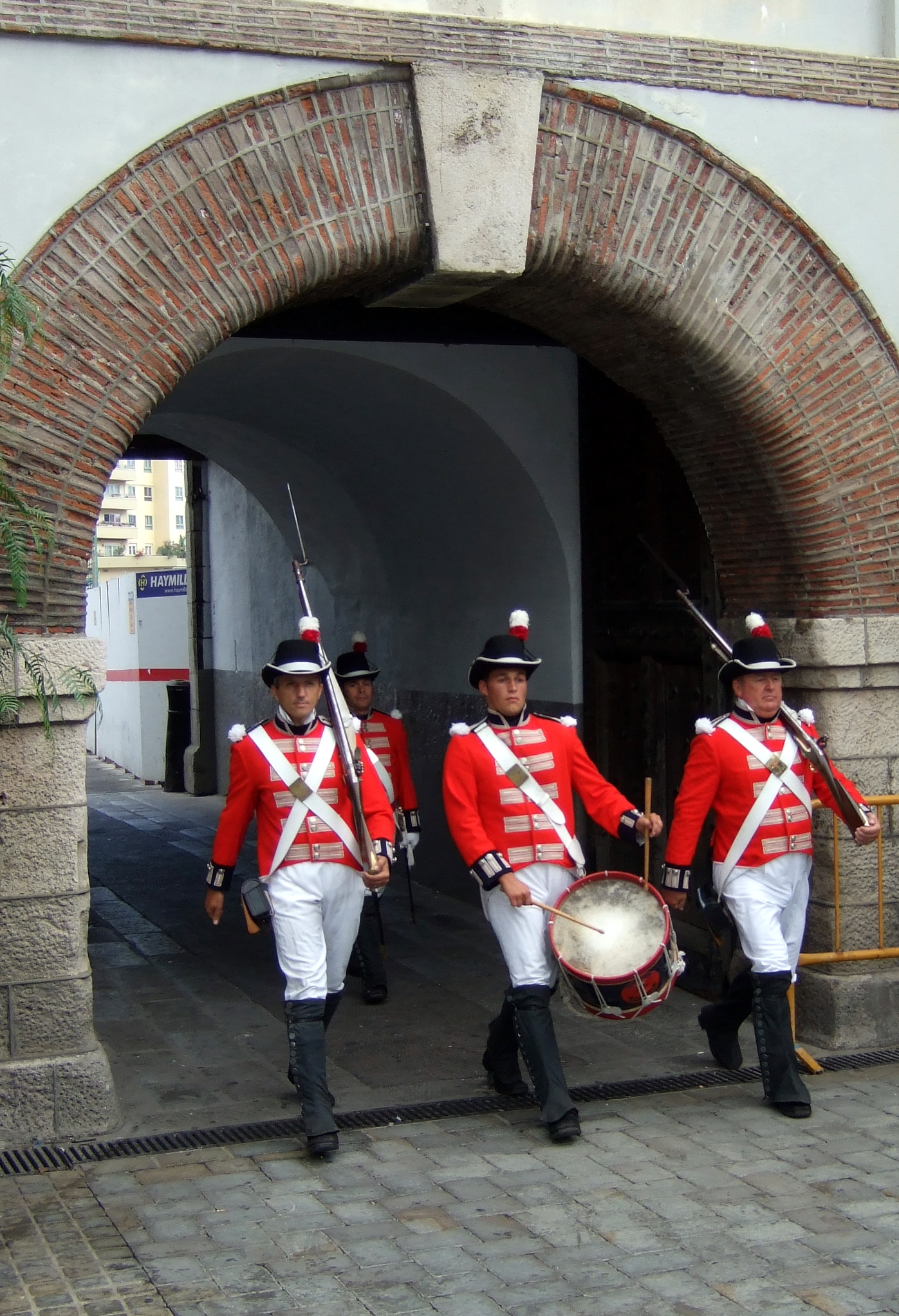
Re-enactment of the Ceremony of the Keys at Grand Casemates Square, Gibraltar by History Alive, 2007.

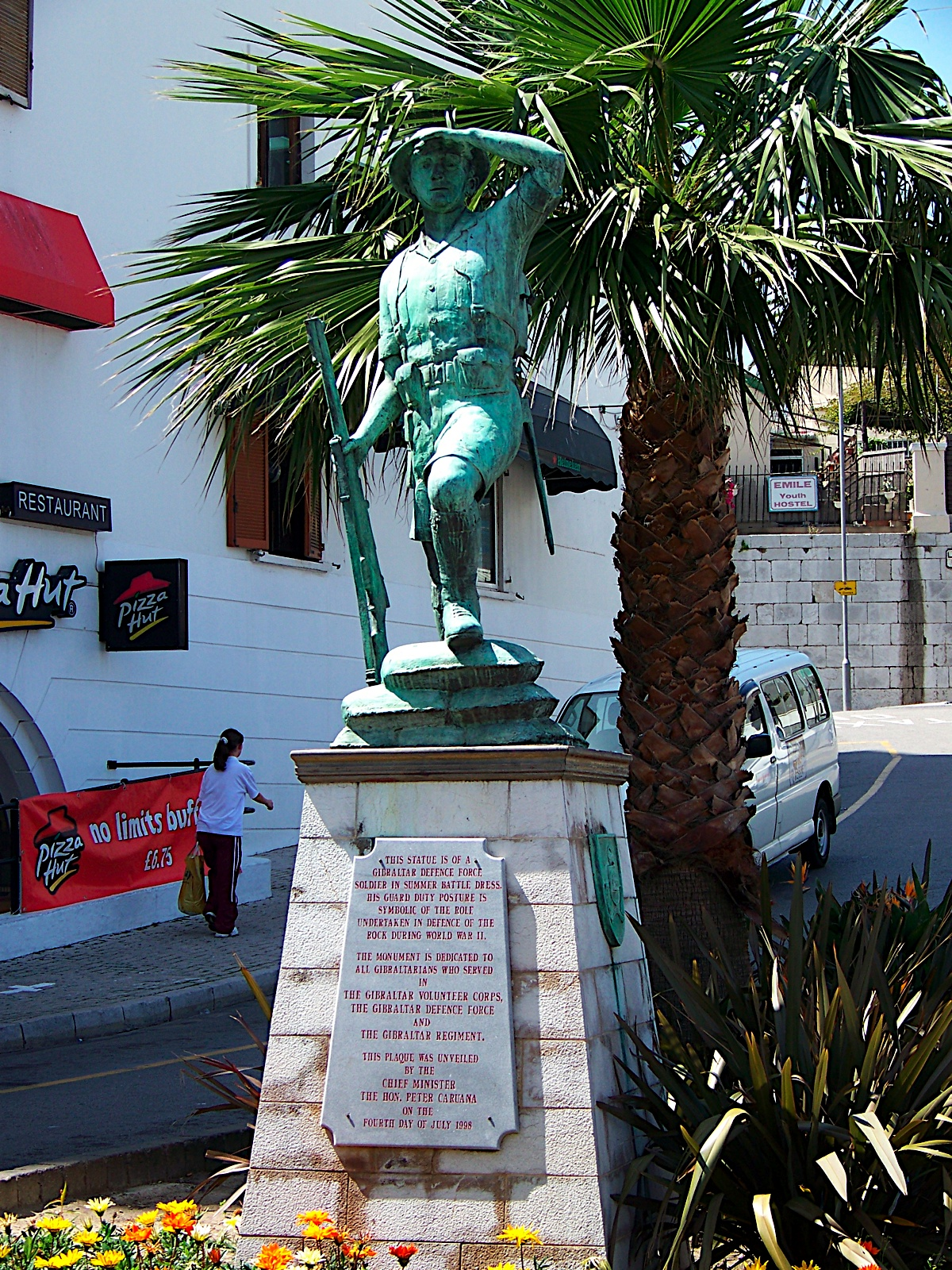
Gibraltar Defence Force Monument at Grand Casemates Square, Gibraltar, 2009.

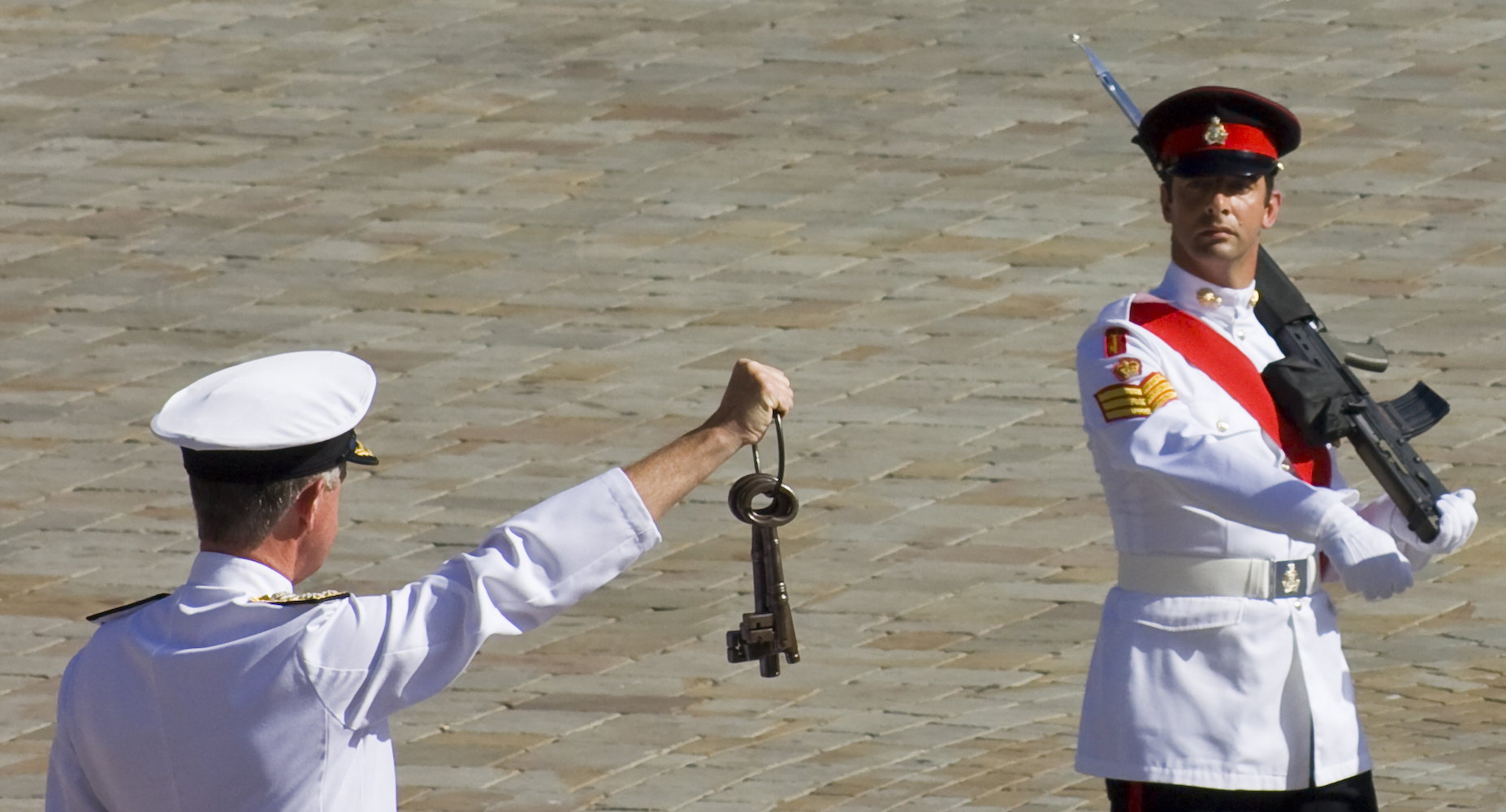
Governor of Gibraltar Sir Adrian Johns holding the Keys of Gibraltar at Grand Casemates Square during the Queen's Birthday Parade in Gibraltar, June 2010.

== Bibliography ==
- Benady, Tito (1996). The Streets of Gibraltar. Gibraltar Books. pp. 17–18. ISBN 0-948466-37-5.
