= Grand Casemates =

- Part of Fortifications of Gibraltar
- Grand Casemates Square, Gibraltar
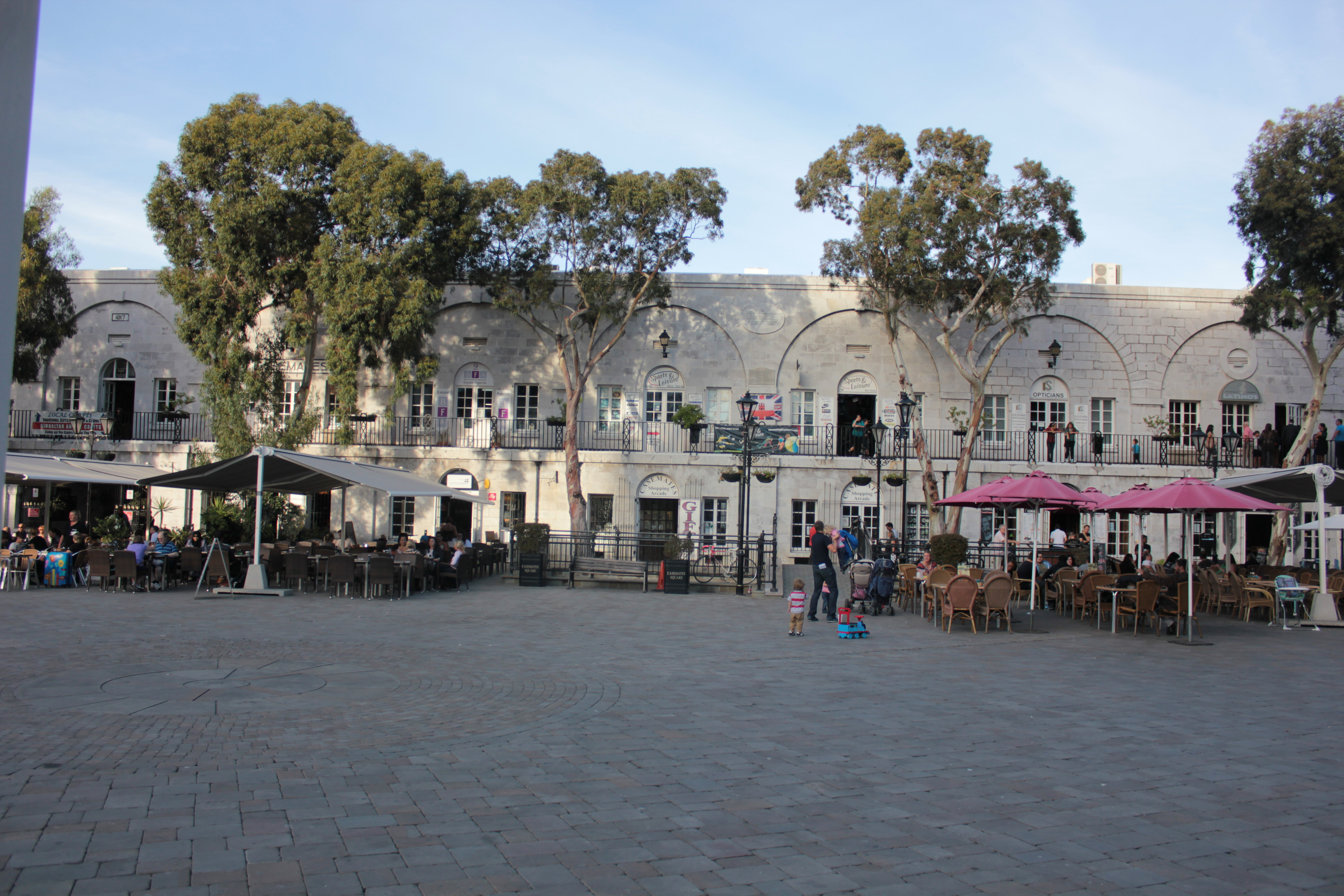
- View of Grand Casemates from Grand Casemates Square.

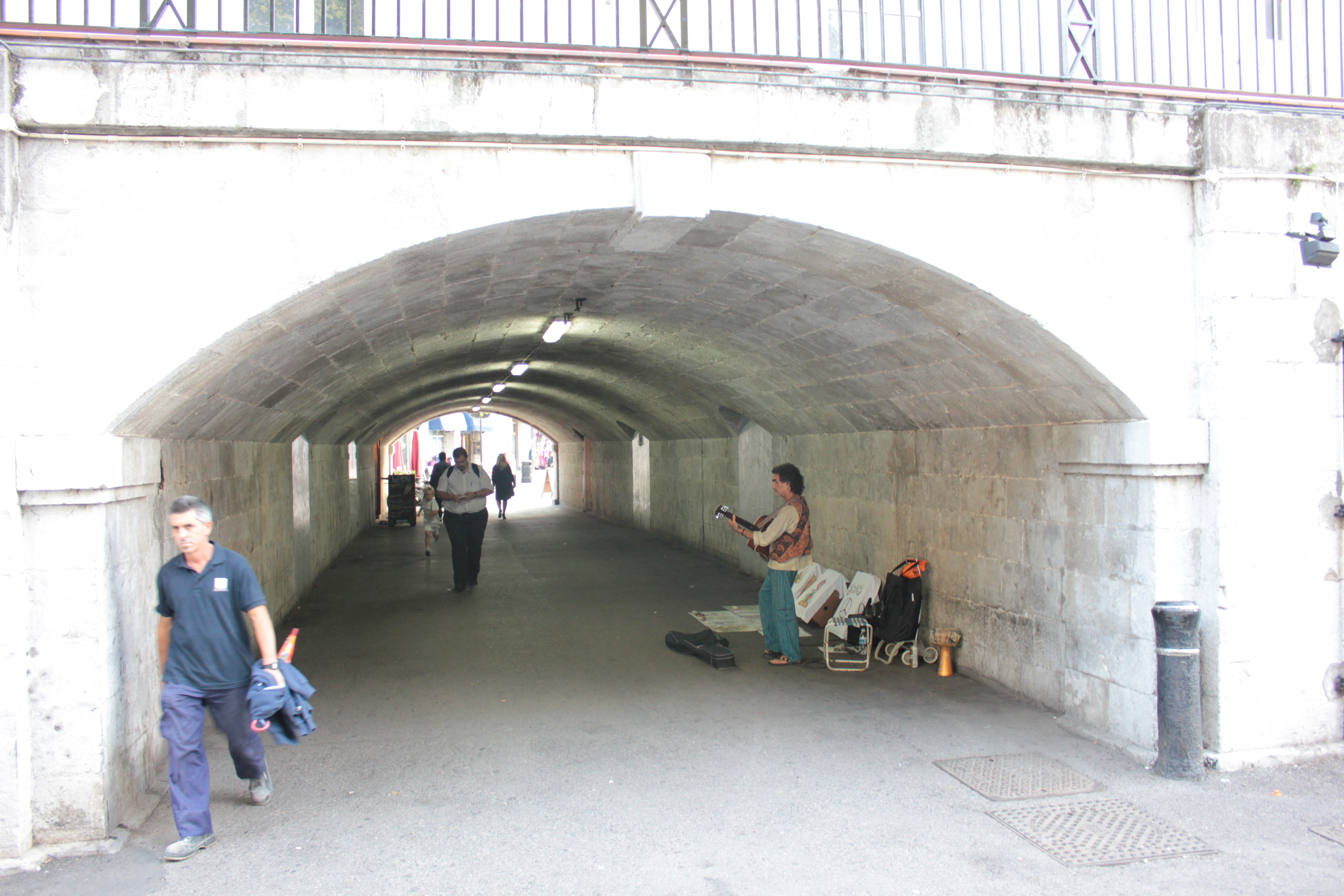
- Tunnel running north-south through Grand Casemates connecting Lanport to Grand Casemates Square.

Site information
- Owner: Government of Gibraltar
- Open to the public: Yes

Location
- Location of the barracks within Gibraltar.
- Coordinates: 36.145133°N 5.352448°W

Site history
- Built: 1817

The Grand Casemates is a building in Grand Casemates Square, Gibraltar, that was originally a fortified barracks and casemate. It is beside Grand Casemates Gates, which leads through the former town wall.

== History ==
Construction of the Grand Casemates bombproof barracks began in the 1770s under Colonel William Green, Gibraltar's Chief Engineer, but the building was only completed in 1817 during the governorship of General Sir George Don.

Hygiene was initially primitive. In 1865 there was an outbreak of cholera in the barracks, with several soldiers dying. In 1868 ablutions and bath rooms had recently been fitted up in the barracks, Jenning's fitments (flush toilets) had been installed in the soldier's latrines and the drainage system overhauled. However, as of 1874 none of the barracks in Gibraltar had baths, and Grand Casemates was the only one with footpans that could be used to hold water for the men to wash themselves. In 1888 it was found that, due to faulty drains, sewage had been soaking into the ground near the soldiers rooms. It was thought that this was the cause of the high incidence of fever in the barracks.

For a period, the barracks were home to about two thousand workers from Morocco. More recently, Grand Casemates has been restored and converted for commercial use with restaurants and shops. The building today houses an arts and crafts exhibition hall on the second floor.
