= Paul Philippe Cret =

French-American architect and industrial designer (1876–1945)

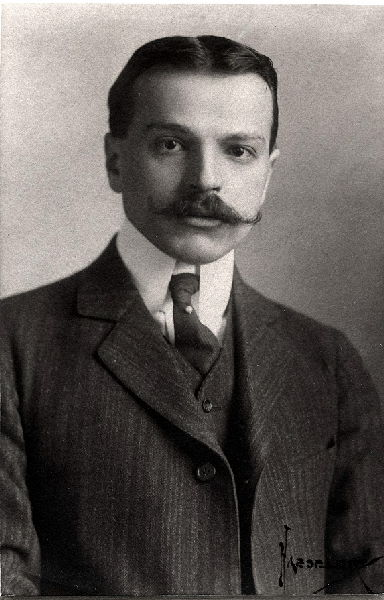
- Cret in 1910 (age 34)
- Born: October 23, 1876; Lyon, France
- Died: September 8, 1945 (aged 68); Philadelphia, Pennsylvania, U.S.
- Burial place: The Woodlands Cemetery, Philadelphia, Pennsylvania, U.S.
- Occupation: Architect

Paul Philippe Cret (October 23, 1876 – September 8, 1945) was a French-born Philadelphia architect and industrial designer. For more than thirty years, he taught at a design studio in the Department of Architecture at the University of Pennsylvania.

== Biography ==
=== Early life and education ===
Born in Lyon, France, Cret was educated at that city's École des Beaux-Arts, then in Paris, where he studied at the atelier of Jean-Louis Pascal.

=== Career ===
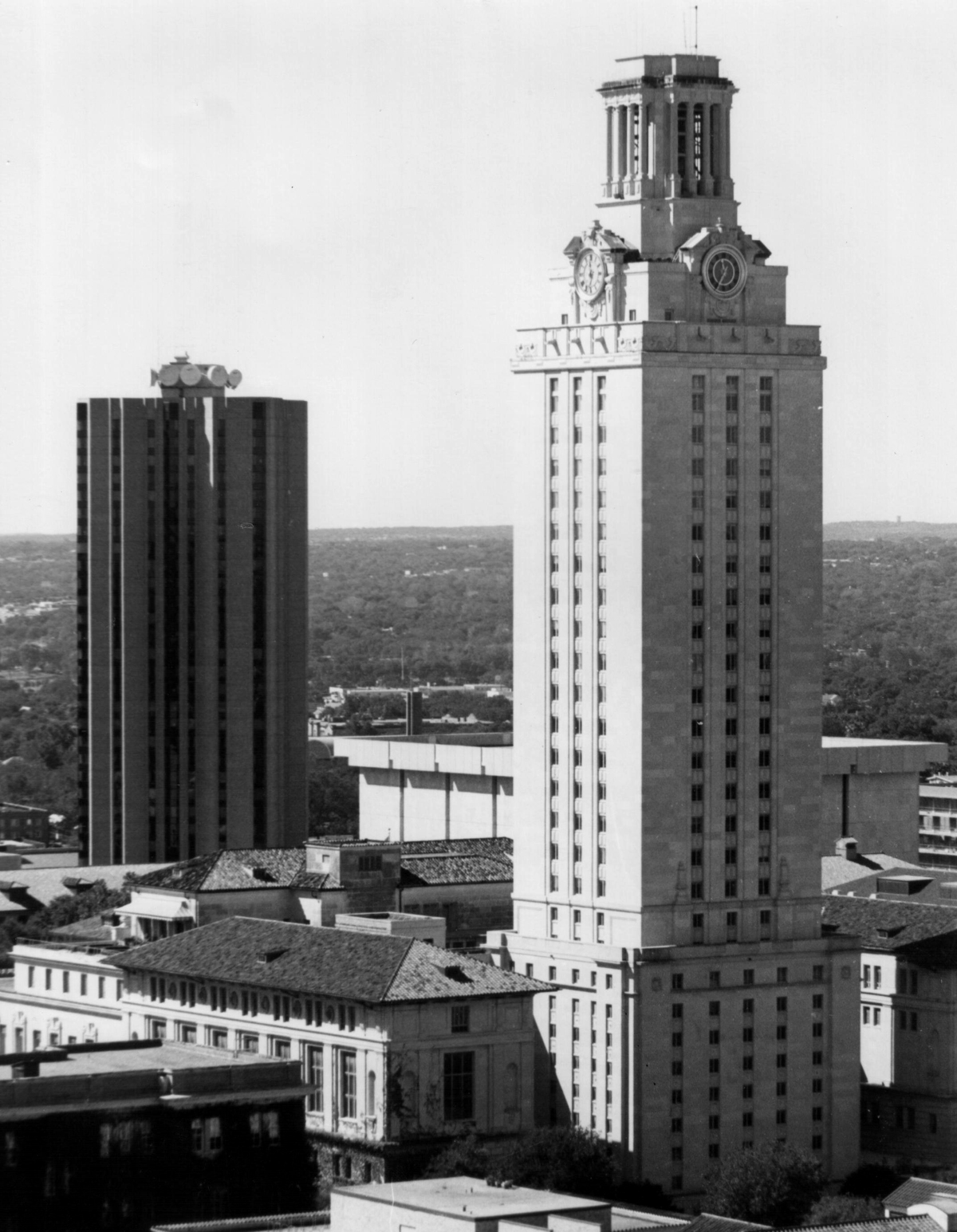
Main Building at the University of Texas in Austin, Texas, one of 20 campus buildings that Cret designed

In 1903, Cret came to the United States to teach at the University of Pennsylvania in Philadelphia. After having settled in the U.S., Cret was visiting France when World War I broke out. He enlisted and remained in the French Army for the duration of the war, and was awarded the Croix de Guerre and made an officer in the Legion of Honor.

Cret's practice in the U.S. began in 1907. His first major commission, designed with Albert Kelsey, was the Pan American Union Building, (the headquarters of what is now the Organization of American States), in Washington D.C., which was built between 1908 and 1910, a breakthrough that led to many war memorials, civic buildings, court houses, and other solid, official structures.

His work through the 1920s was firmly in the Beaux-Arts tradition, but with the radically simplified classical form of the Folger Shakespeare Library, built between 1929 and 1932, he flexibly adopted and applied monumental classical traditions to modernist innovations. Some of Cret's work is remarkably streamlined and forward thinking, and includes collaborations with sculptors such as Alfred Bottiau and Leon Hermant. In the late 1920s, he was brought in as design consultant on Fellheimer and Wagner's, which is the present-day Cincinnati Union Terminal, built between 1929 and 1933 during Art Deco's peak of popularity in architectural style in the U.S. In 1927, Cret became a U.S. citizen. Cret was elected to the American Philosophical Society in 1928.

In 1931, the regents of the University of Texas at Austin commissioned Cret to design a master plan for the campus, and build the Beaux-Art Main Building, which was constructed between 1934 and 1937 and is the university's signature building structure. Cret went on to collaborate on about 20 additional buildings on the University of Texas at Austin campus. In 1935, he was elected into the National Academy of Design as an associate member, and became a full academician in 1938.

Cret's contributions to the railroad industry included designing the side fluting on Burlington's Pioneer Zephyr, which debuted in 1934, and the Santa Fe's Super Chief passenger cars, which were completed in 1936.

He was a contributor to Architectural Record, American Architect, and The Craftsman. He wrote the article "Animals in Christian Art" for the Catholic Encyclopedia.

Cret won the Gold Medal of the American Institute of Architects in 1938. Ill health forced his resignation from teaching in 1937. He served on the U.S. Commission of Fine Arts from 1940 to 1945.

Cret's work was displayed in the exhibit, From the Bastille to Broad Street: The Influence of France on Philadelphia Architecture, at the Athenaeum of Philadelphia in 2011. An exhibit of his train designs, All Aboard! Paul P. Cret's Train Designs, was displayed at the Athenaeum of Philadelphia from July 5, 2012 to August 24, 2012. With a collection of 17,000 drawings and more than 3,000 photographs, the Athenaeum of Philadelphia has the largest archive of Cret's work.

=== Death ===
After years of limited activity, Cret died in Philadelphia of heart disease on September 8, 1945. He was interred at The Woodlands in Philadelphia.

== Legacy ==
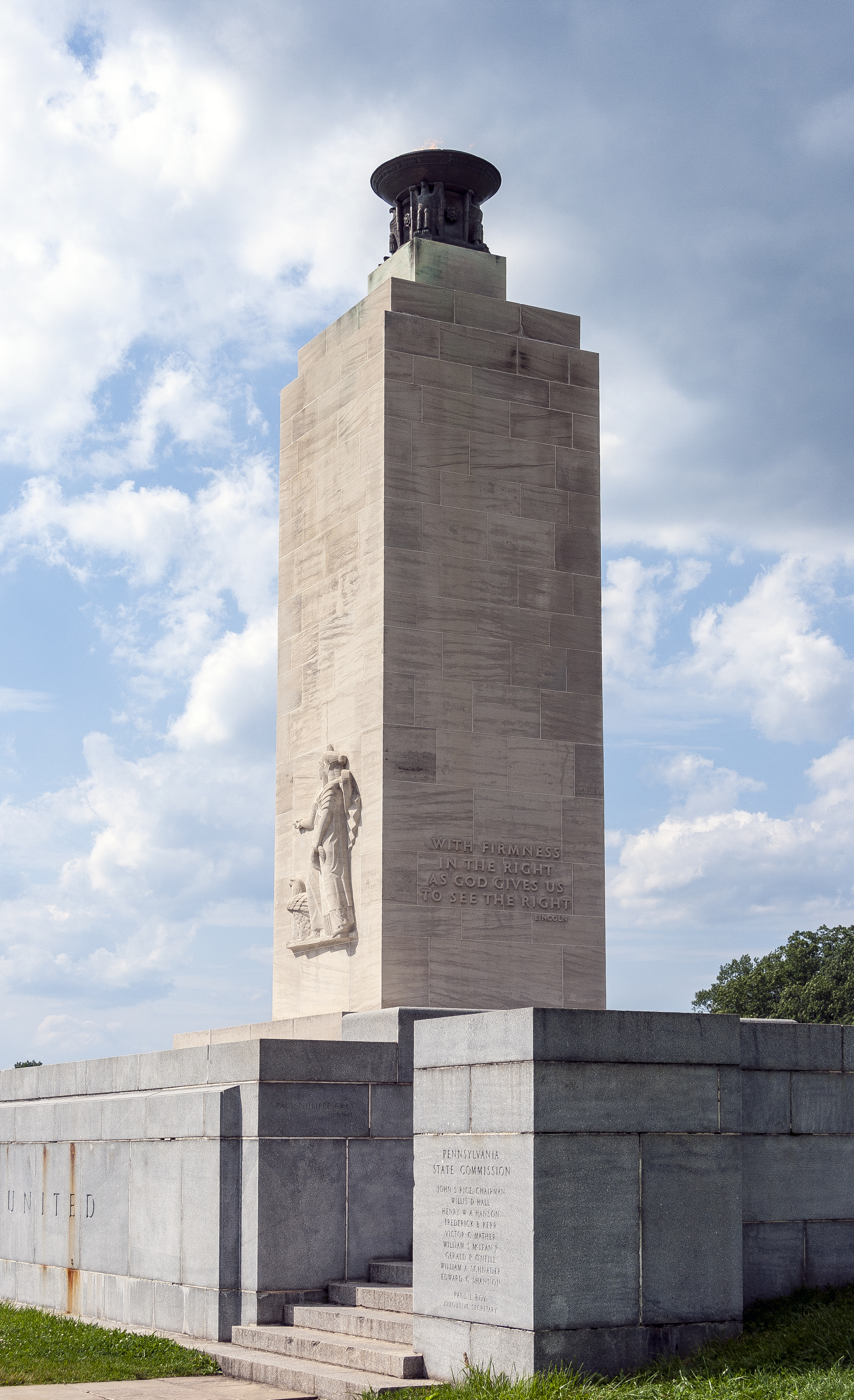
The Eternal Light Peace Memorial at Gettysburg Battlefield in Gettysburg, Pennsylvania, designed by Cret and sculpted by Lee Lawrie in 1938

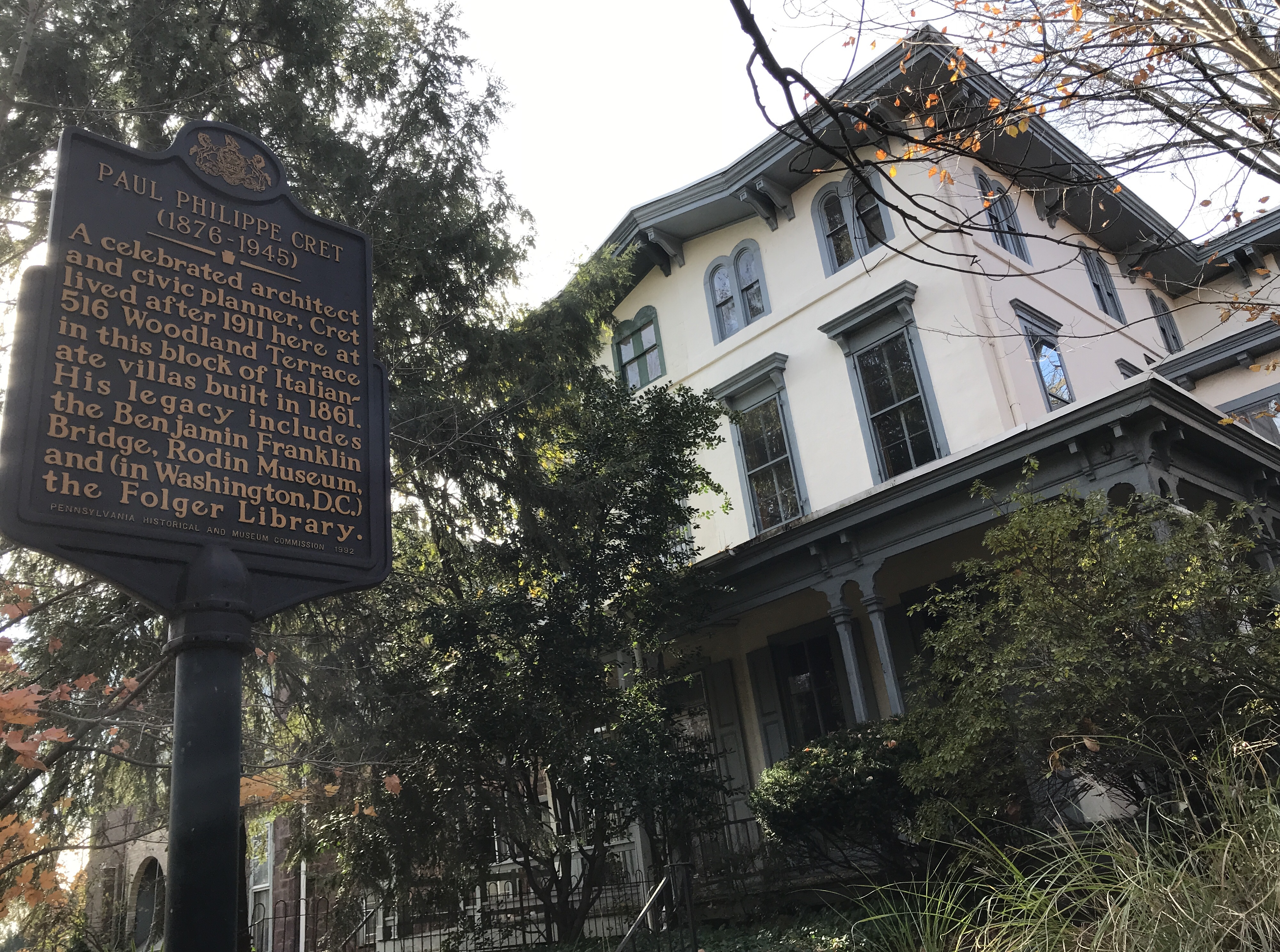
Cret designed historical markers for the Pennsylvania Historical Commission, whose successor organization put up this tablet to mark Cret's former home at 516 Woodland Terrace in Philadelphia.

Cret taught in the Department of Architecture at the University of Pennsylvania for over 30 years, and designed the overall design for the Ellen Phillips Samuel Memorial in Fairmount Park, the Rodin Museum in Philadelphia, the master plan for the University of Texas at Austin, the Benjamin Franklin Bridge, one of the primary bridges across the Delaware River between Philadelphia and South Jersey, and the Duke Ellington Bridge in Washington, D.C.

Cret's students included Louis Kahn, who studied under him at the University of Pennsylvania and worked in Cret's architectural office in 1929 and 1930. Other notable architects who studied under Cret include Alfred Easton Poor, Charles I. Barber, William Ward Watkin, Edwin A. Keeble, Alfred Bendiner, and Chinese architect Lin Huiyin.

Cret designed war memorials, including the National Memorial Arch at Valley Forge National Historical Park (1914–17), the Pennsylvania Memorial at the Meuse-Argonne Battlefield in Varennes-en-Argonne, France (1927), the Chateau-Thierry American Monument in Aisne, France (1930), the American War Memorial at Gibraltar, and the Flanders Field American Cemetery and Memorial in Waregem, Belgium (1937). On the 75th anniversary of the Battle of Gettysburg, President Franklin D. Roosevelt dedicated Cret's Eternal Light Peace Memorial (1938).

For the Pennsylvania Historical Commission, the predecessor of the Pennsylvania Historical and Museum Commission (PHMC), Cret designed plaques that would mark places and buildings in Pennsylvania where historical events had transpired.

Following Cret's death in 1945, his four partners assumed the practice under the partnership Harbeson, Hough, Livingston & Larson, which for years was referred to by staff members as H2L2. The firm officially adopted this nickname as its formal title in 1976. H2L2 celebrated 100 years in 2007.

Witold Rybczynski has speculated that Cret is not better known today due to his influence on fascist and Nazi architecture, such as Albert Speer's Zeppelinfeld at the Nazi party rally grounds in Nuremberg.

== Major projects ==
- 1908–09: Stock Pavilion in Madison, Wisconsin (with Warren Laird and Arthur Peabody)
- 1908–10: Pan American Union Building in Washington, D.C. (with Albert Kelsey)
- 1914–17: National Memorial Arch at Valley Forge National Historical Park in Valley Forge, Pennsylvania
- 1916–17: Central Library in Indianapolis (with Zantzinger, Borie and Medary)
- 1922–26: Benjamin Franklin Bridge crossing the Delaware River from Philadelphia to Camden, New Jersey
- 1923–25: Barnes Foundation in Merion, Pennsylvania
- 1923–27: Detroit Institute of Arts in Detroit (with Zantzinger, Borie and Medary)
- 1926–29: Rodin Museum in Philadelphia (with Jacques Gréber)
- 1928–29: George Rogers Clark Memorial Bridge in Louisville, Kentucky
- 1929: Integrity Trust Company Building in Philadelphia
- 1929: World War I Memorial in Providence, Rhode Island
- 1929–32: Folger Shakespeare Library in Washington, D.C.
- 1930: Chateau-Thierry American Monument in Aisne, France
- 1930–32: Henry Avenue Bridge over Wissahickon Creek in Philadelphia
- 1931–32: Connecticut Avenue Bridge over Klingle Valley in Washington, D.C.
- 1932: Federal Reserve Bank of Philadelphia at 925 Chestnut Street in Philadelphia
- 1932–33: Hershey Community Center Building in Hershey, Pennsylvania
- 1933: United States Courthouse in Fort Worth, Texas (consulting architect)
- 1933–34: Central Heating Plant in Washington, D.C.
- 1933–61: Ellen Phillips Samuel Memorial in Philadelphia
- 1934–37: Main Building of The University of Texas at Austin in Austin, Texas
- 1934–38: Tygart River Reservoir Dam near Grafton, West Virginia
- 1935: Duke Ellington Bridge in Washington, D.C.
- 1935–37: Eccles Building in Washington, D.C.
- 1935–37: Hipolito F. Garcia Federal Building and U.S. Courthouse in San Antonio, Texas
- 1936: Fair Park Texas Centennial Exposition Buildings at the Texas Centennial Exposition in Dallas (consulting architect)
- 1936–39: Texas Memorial Museum, in Austin, Texas (consulting architect)
- 1937: Flanders Field American Cemetery and Memorial in Waregem, Belgium (with Jacques Gréber)
- 1938: Eternal Light Peace Memorial at Gettysburg Battlefield in Gettysburg, Pennsylvania (Lee Lawrie, sculptor)
- 1939–44: National Naval Medical Center, Buildings 1 and 17, in Bethesda, Maryland (consulting architect)
- 1940: 2601 Parkway in Philadelphia

== Gallery ==
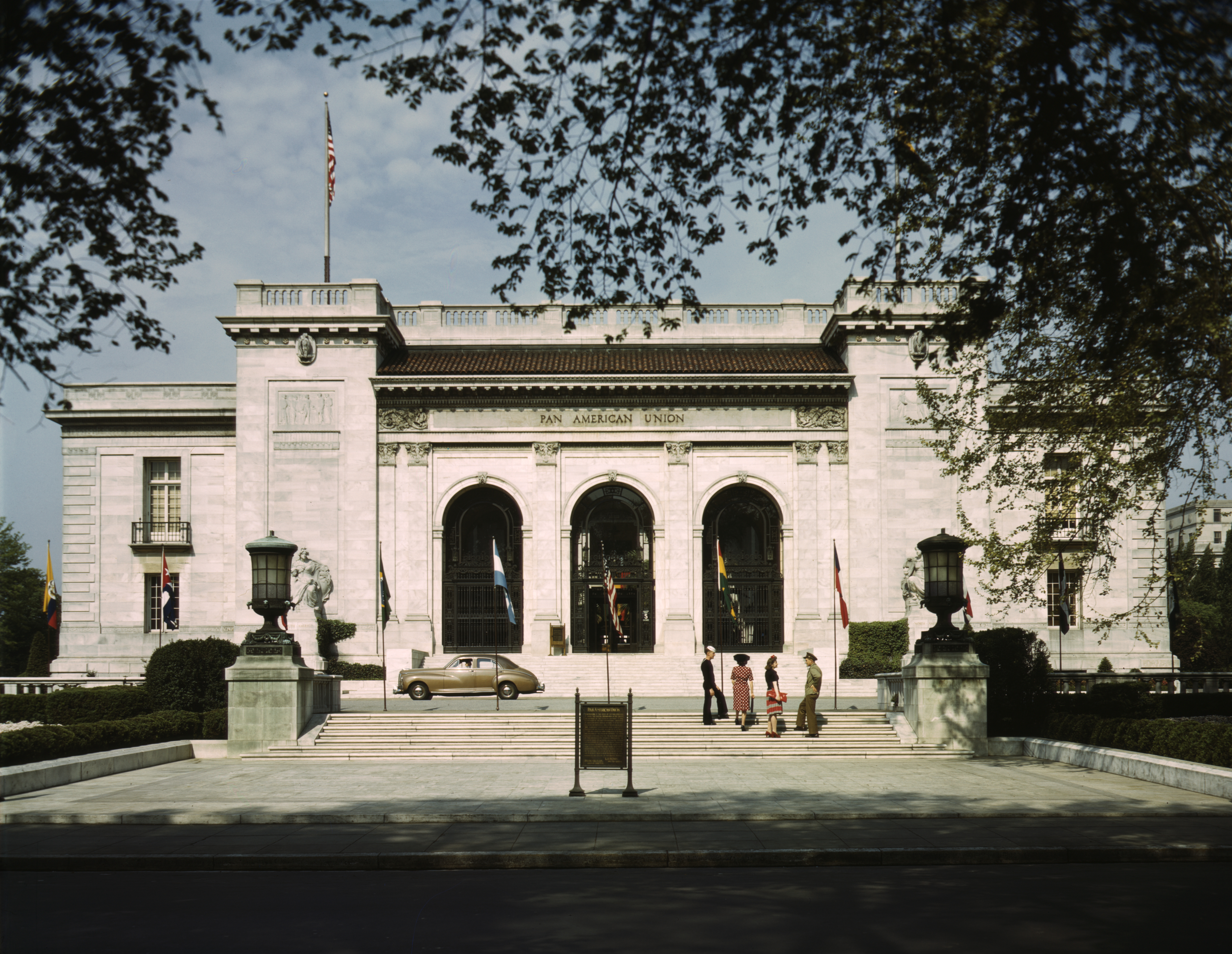
Pan-American Union, now the Organization of American States, in Washington, D.C. (1908–10), (with Albert Kelsey)

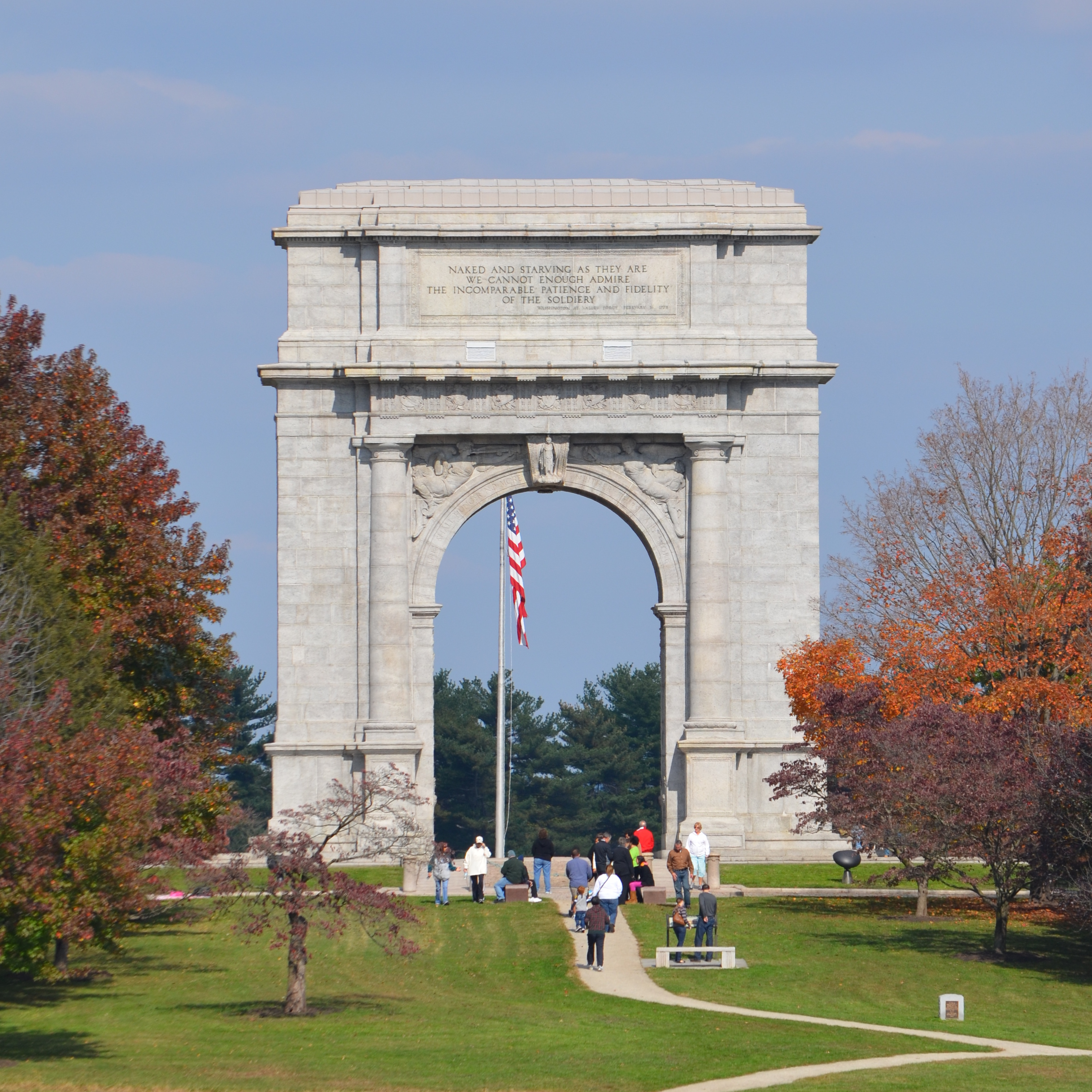
National Memorial Arch at Valley Forge National Historical Park, in Valley Forge, Pennsylvania (1914–17)

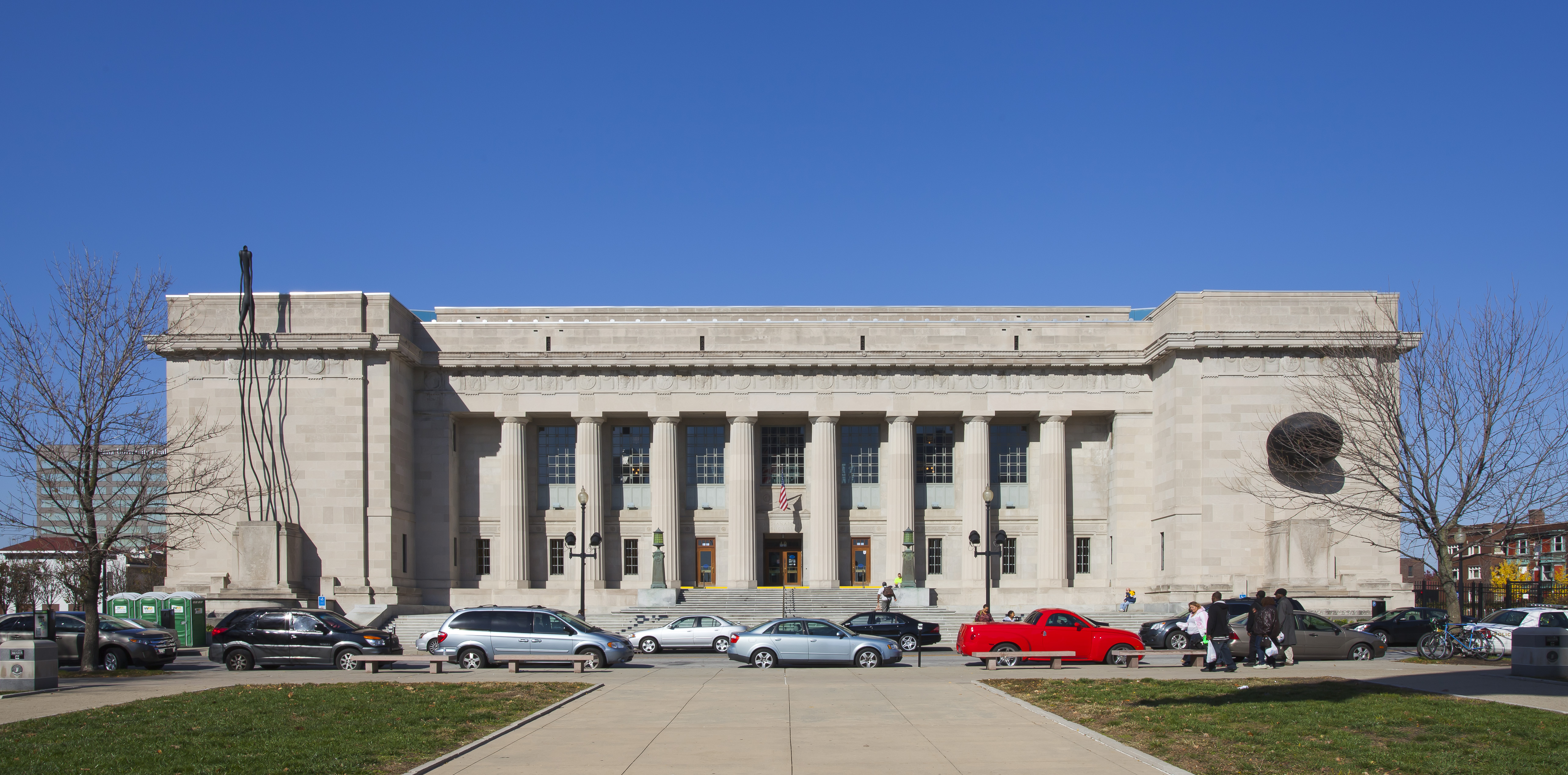
Indianapolis Central Library in Indianapolis (1916–17), (with Zantzinger, Borie and Medary)

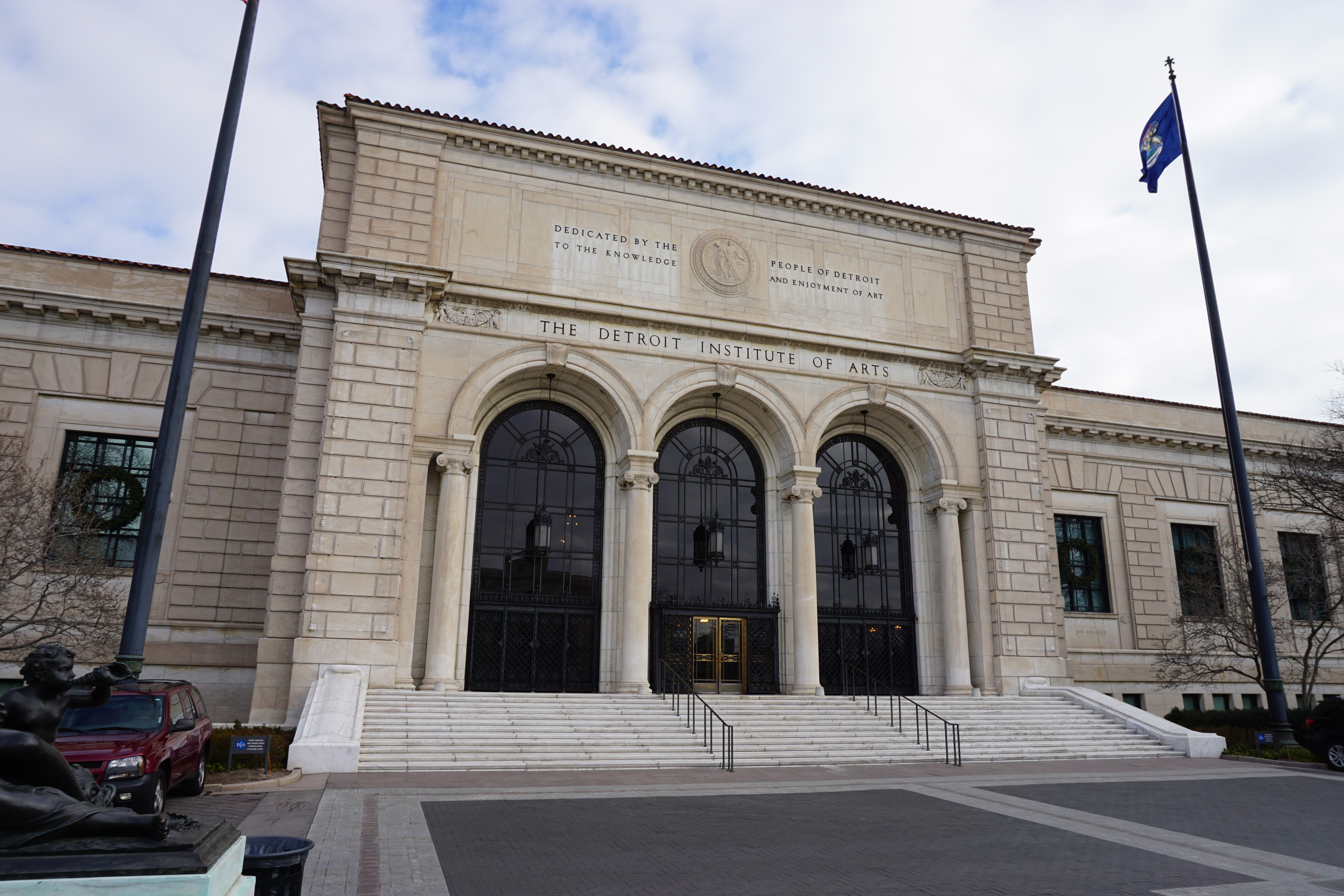
Detroit Institute of Arts in Detroit (1923–27), (with Zantzinger, Borie and Medary)

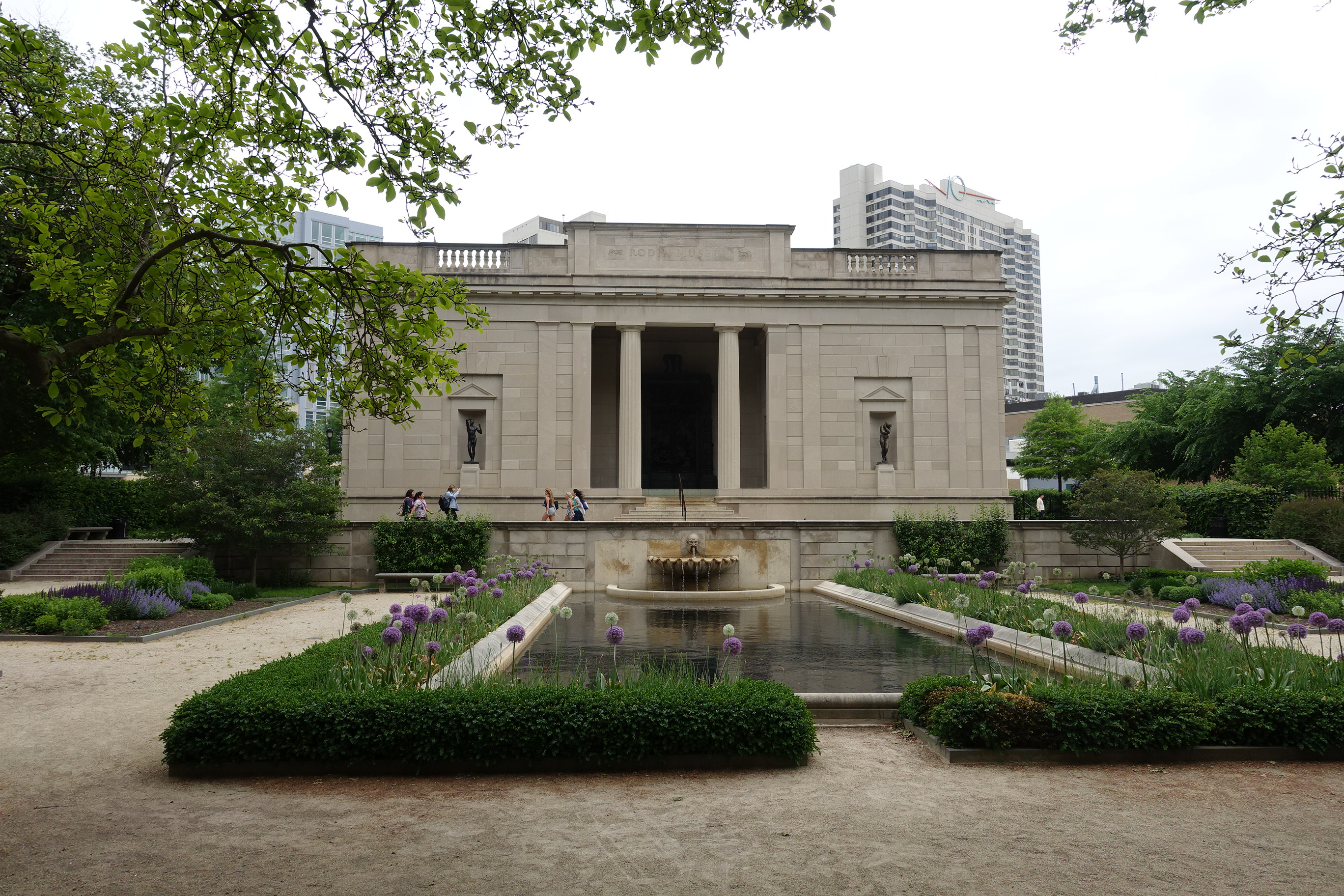
Rodin Museum in Philadelphia (1926–29), (Jacques Gréber, landscape architect)

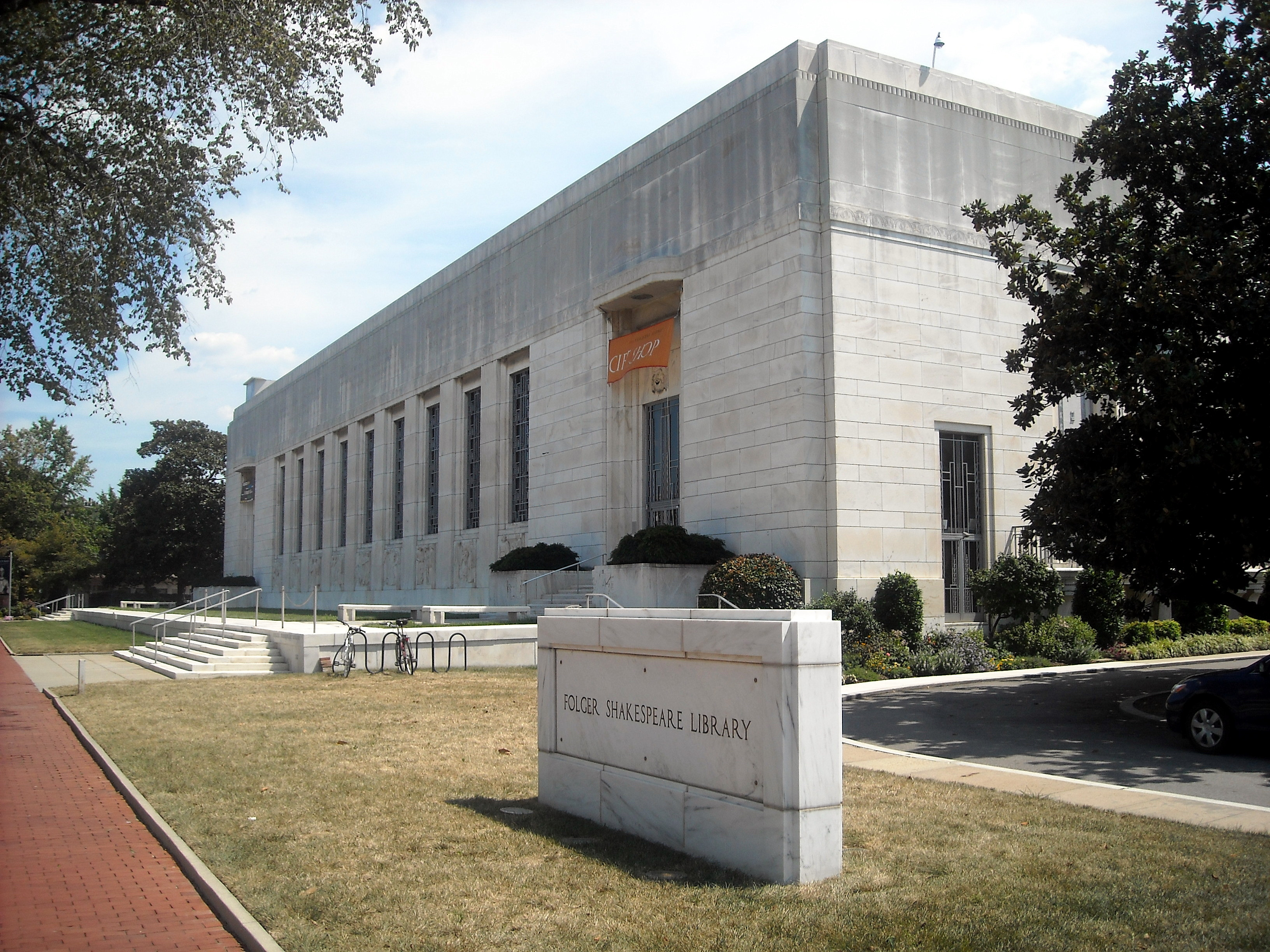
Folger Shakespeare Library in Washington, D.C. (1929–32)

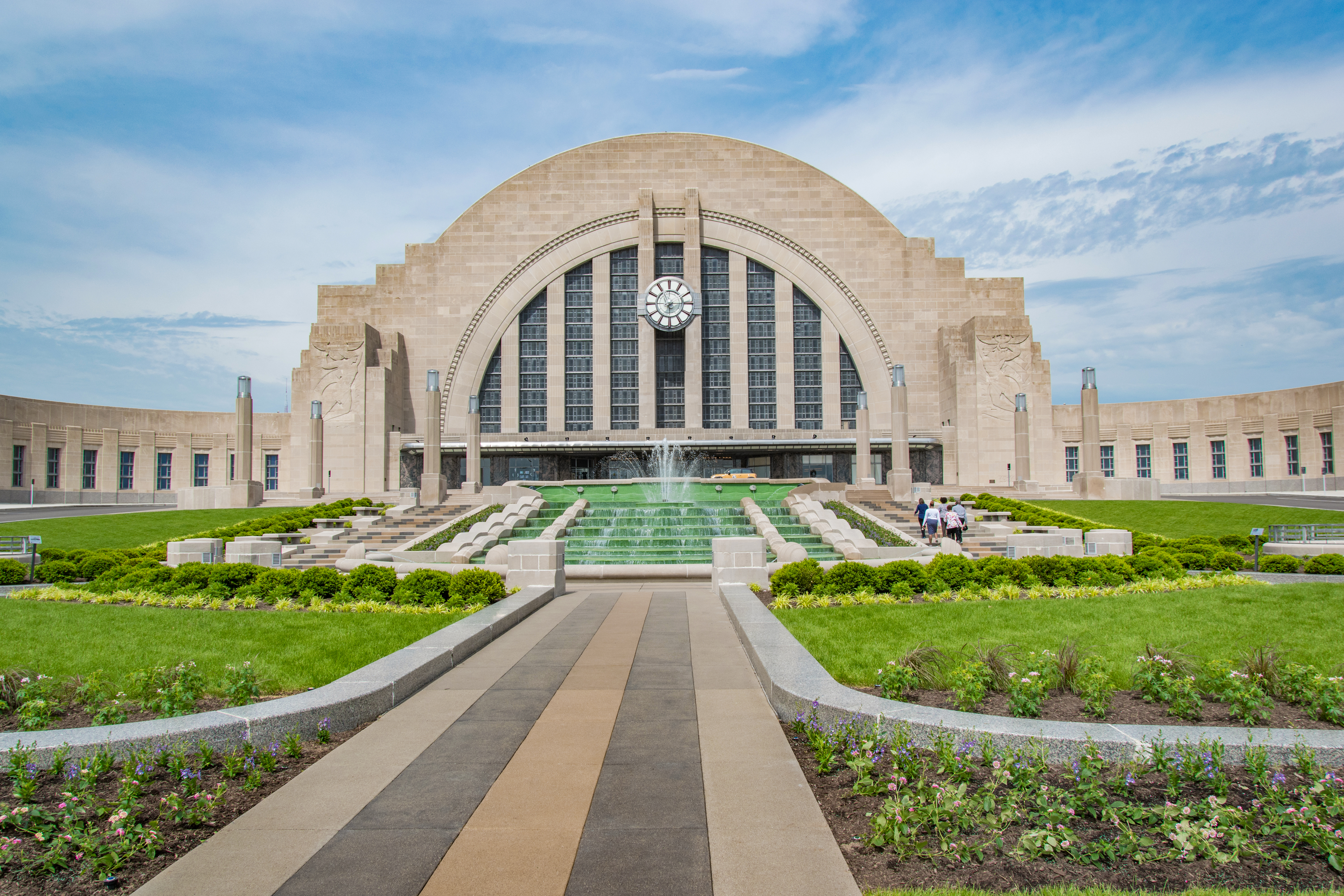
Cincinnati Union Terminal in Cincinnati (1929–33), (with Fellheimer & Wagner)

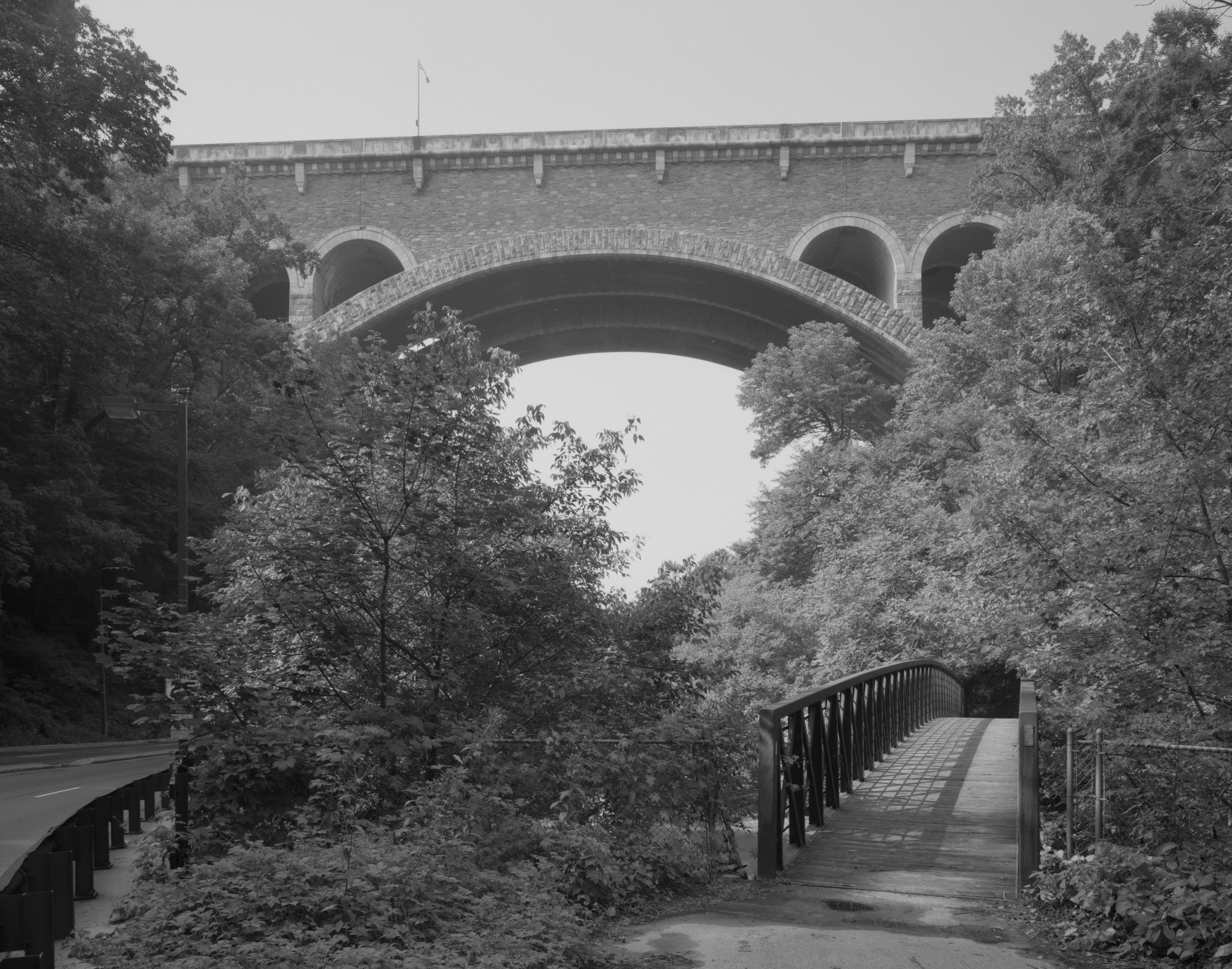
Henry Avenue Bridge over Wissahickon Creek in Philadelphia (1930–32)

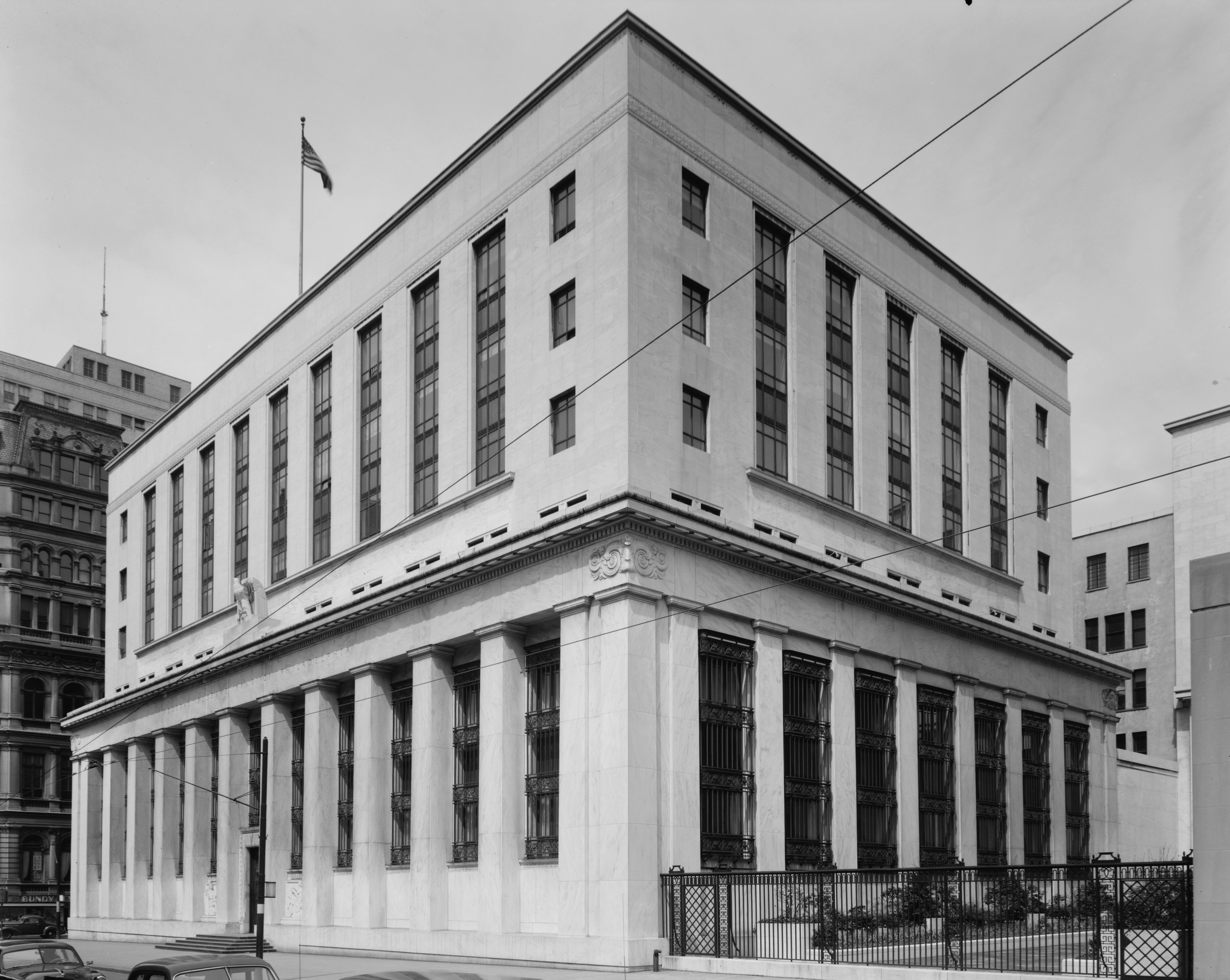
Federal Reserve Bank of Philadelphia in Philadelphia (1932)

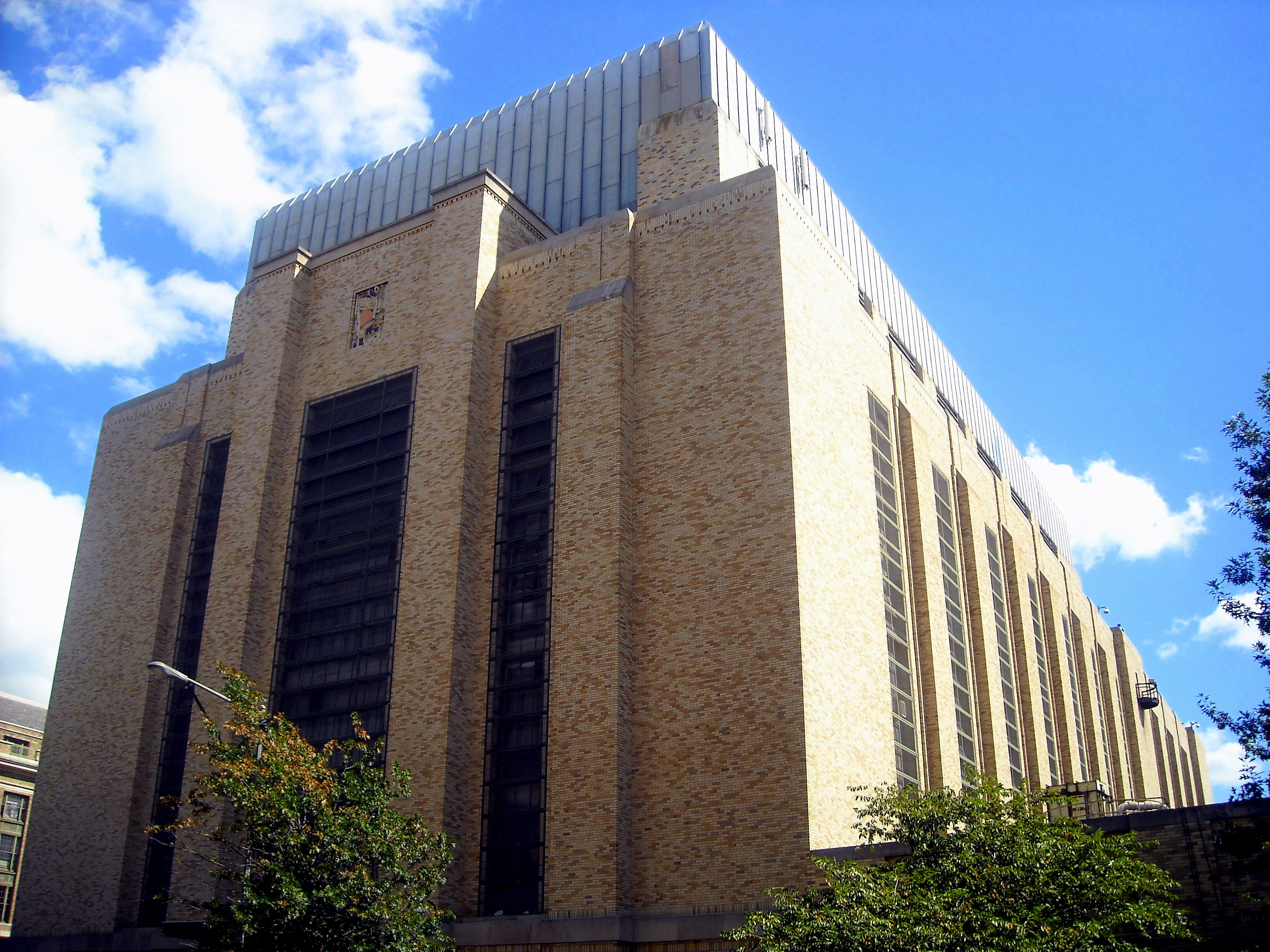
Central Heating Plant in Washington, D.C. (1933–34)

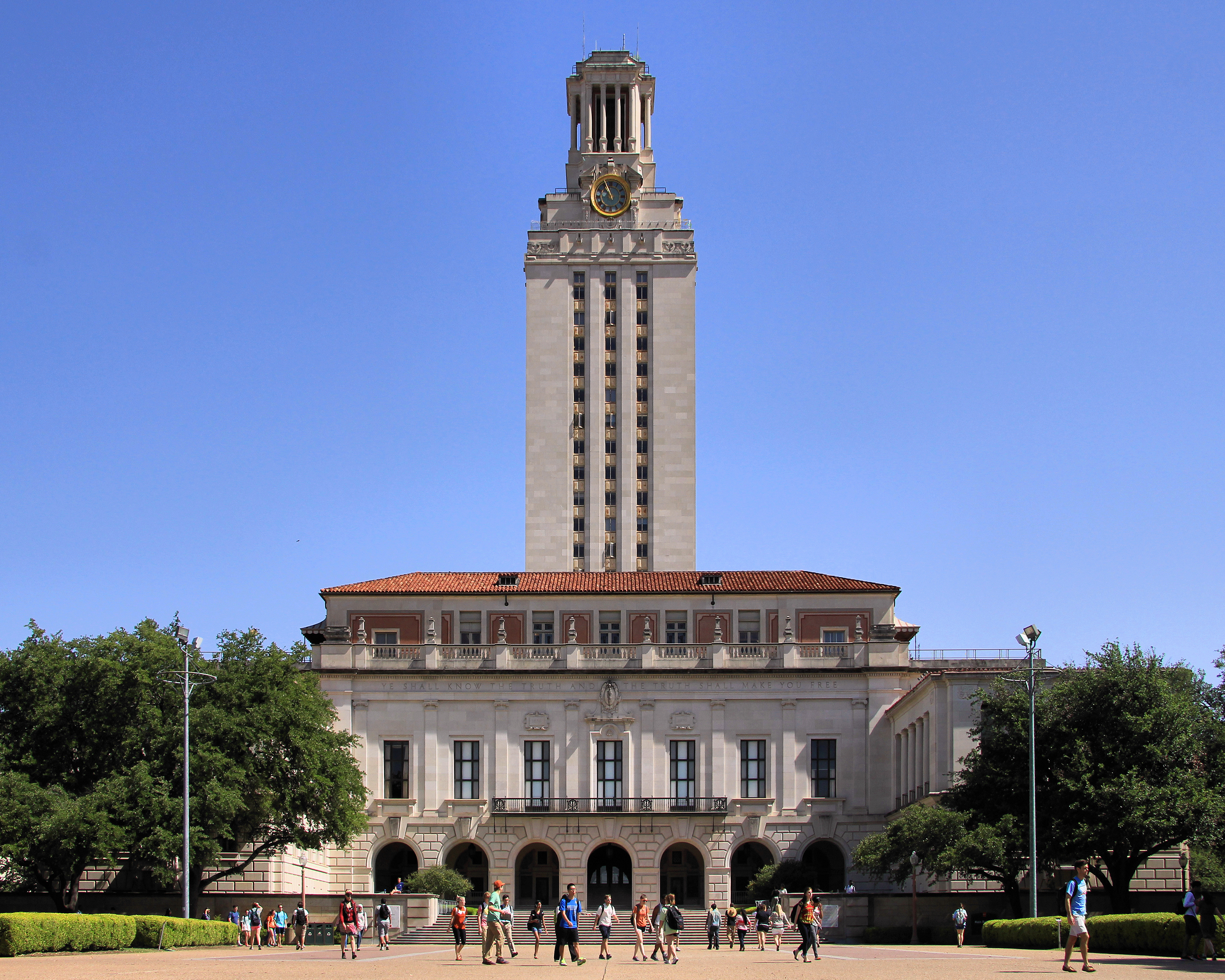
Main Building, University of Texas in Austin, Texas (1934–37)

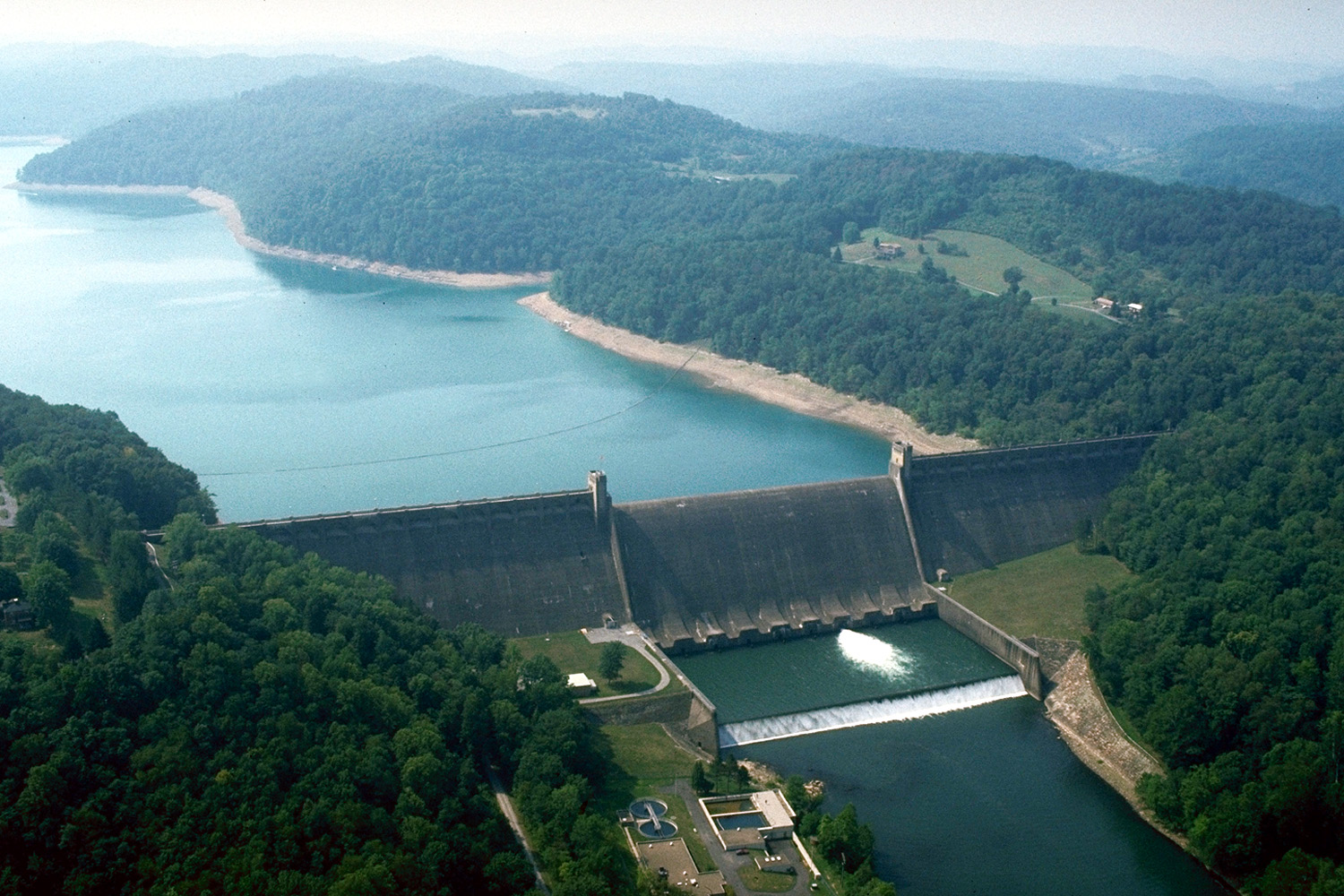
Tygart River Reservoir Dam near Grafton, West Virginia (1934–38)

The seal for the Board of Governors of the Federal Reserve System, 1936

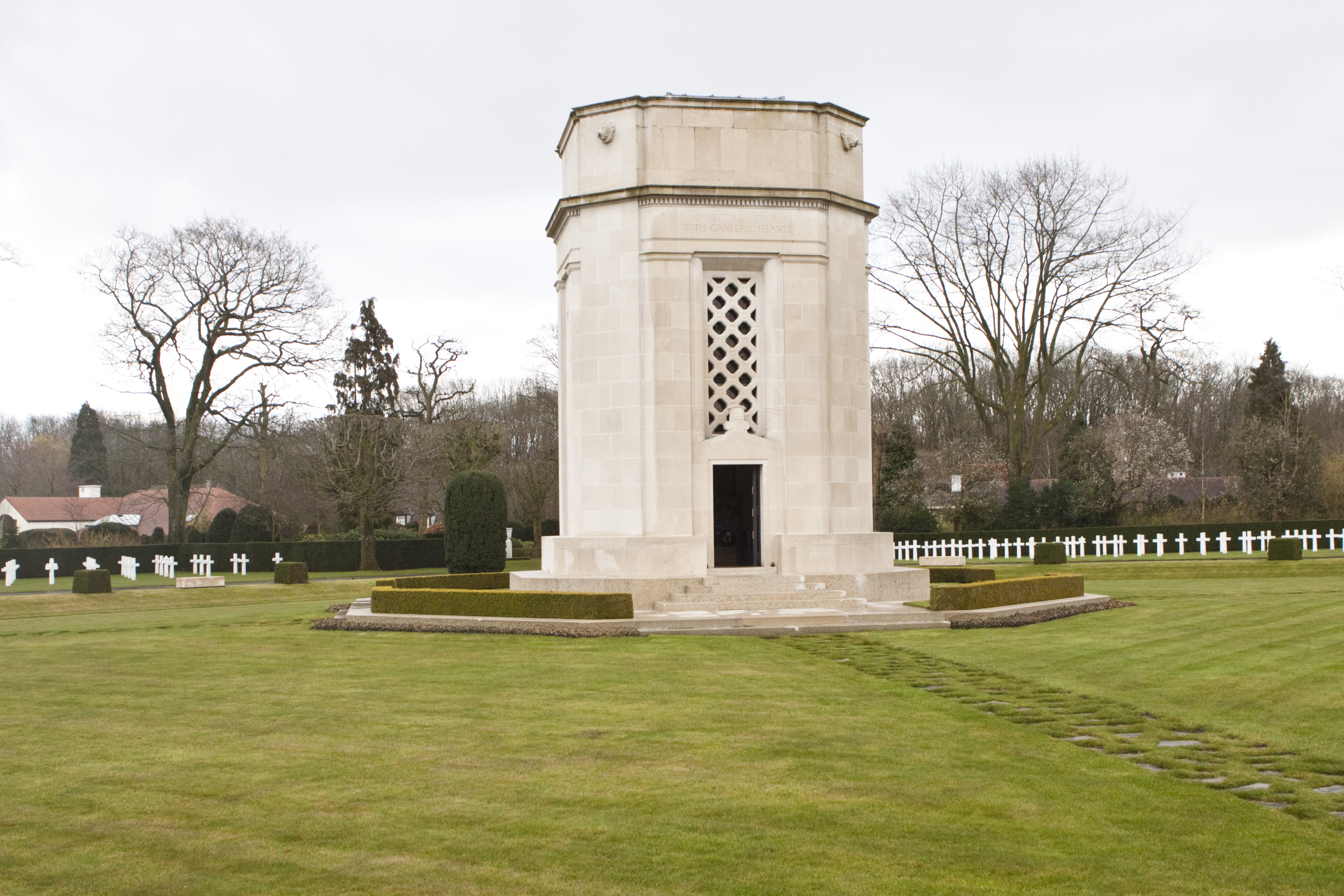
Flanders Field American Cemetery and Memorial in Waregem, Belgium (1937), (Jacques Gréber, landscape architect)

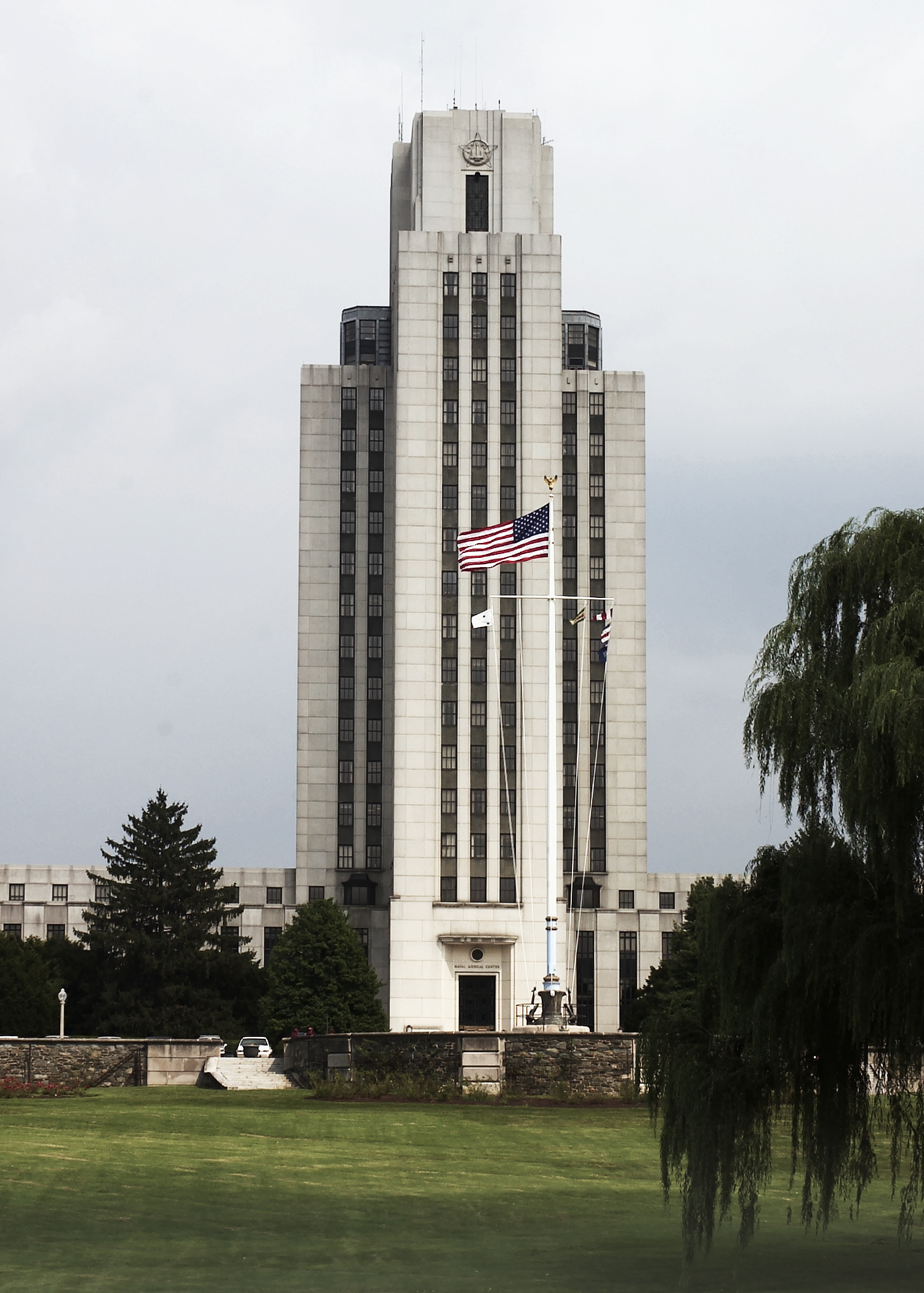
Bethesda Naval Hospital Tower, also known as Building 1, in Bethesda, Maryland (1939–42). President Franklin D. Roosevelt picked the location and drew a rough plan and sketches for this building.

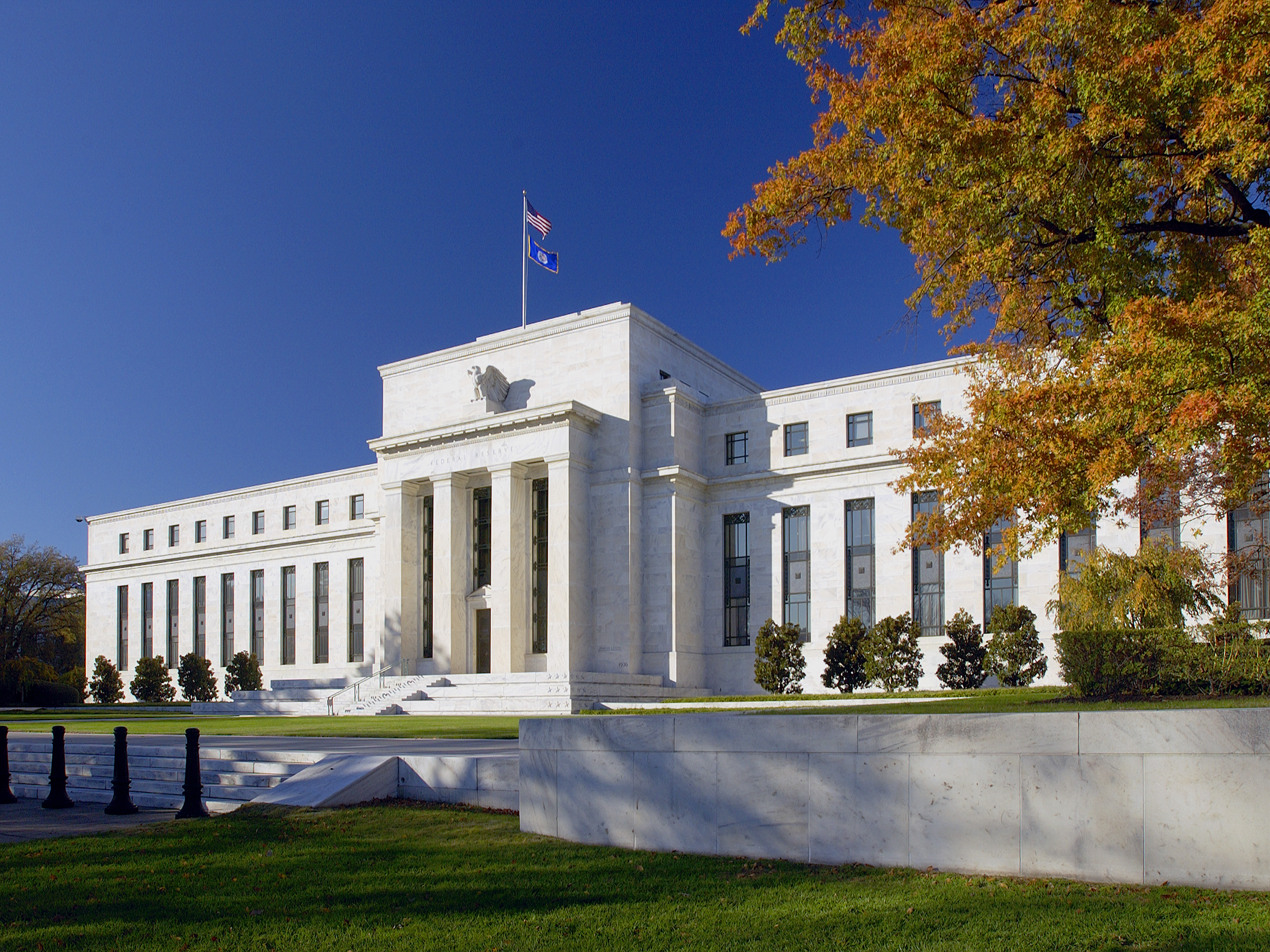
Eccles Building, the headquarters of the Federal Reserve in Washington, D.C. (1935–37)
