= House of The Americas =

House of The Americas may refer to:

- Casa de las Américas, a socio-cultural organization founded by the Cuban Government in 1959
- Pan American Union Building, headquarters of the Organization of American States in Washington, DC
