= Statue of Isabella I of Castile =

Statue in Washington, D.C., U.S.

Isabella I of Castile
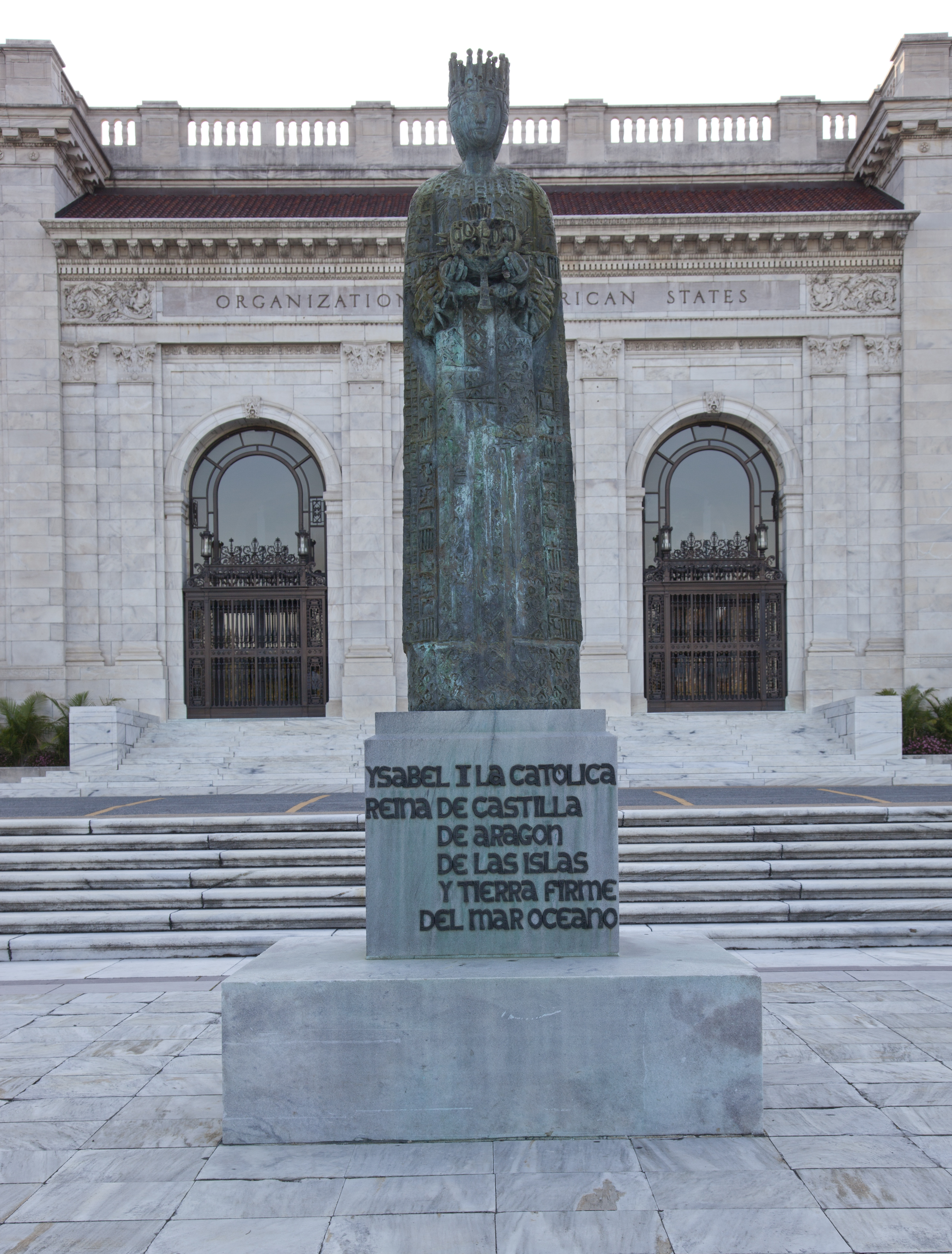
- The statue in 2010
- Type: Sculpture
- Subject: Isabella I of Castile
- Location: Washington, D.C., United States; 38.892862°N 77.039677°W

Queen Isabella, also known as Queen Isabella (1451–1504), is an outdoor sculpture of Isabella I of Castile, installed outside the Pan American Union Building of the Organization of American States at 17th Street and Constitution Avenue NW in Washington, D.C., in the United States.

The statue, sculpted by Spanish sculptor José Luis Sánchez (1926-2018), shows Isabella wearing a crown and robes decorated with the heraldic devices of Castile, León, Aragon, and Navarre. She holds a large pomegranate (the symbol of Granada) with a dove in the center. The statue was gifted by the Institute of Hispanic Culture, a Madrid-based institution of the Spanish State, on April 14, 1966, the 475th anniversary of Christopher Columbus's first sighting of the Americas; Isabella was chosen as she had sponsored Columbus's voyage.

Indigenous rights activists defaced the statue with items of indigenous Andean Pollera dress in 2022 and called for it to be removed due to Isabella's role in igniting colonization, the genocide of indigenous Americans, and the Atlantic slave trade.

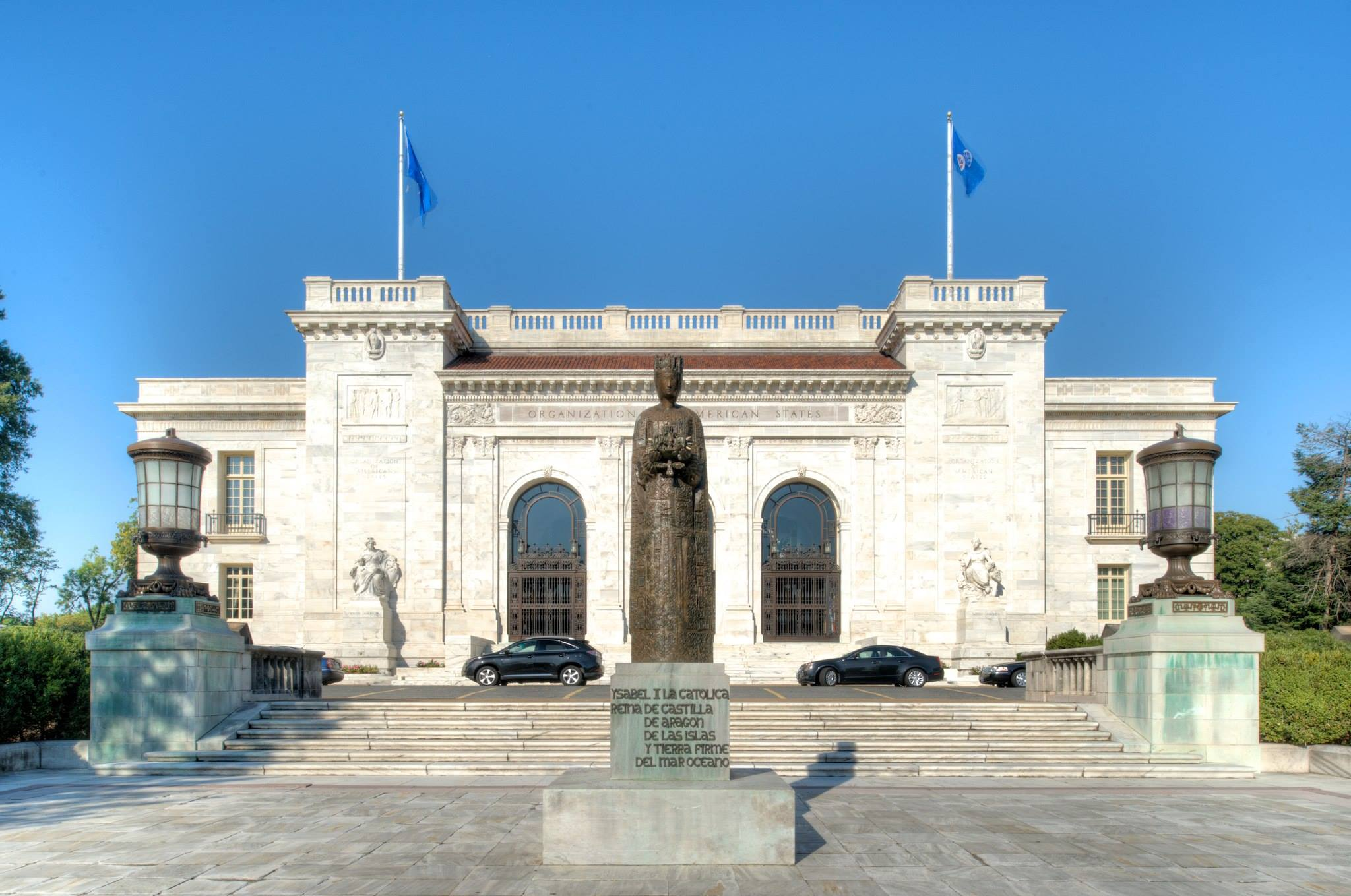
The statue in front of the Pan American Union Building

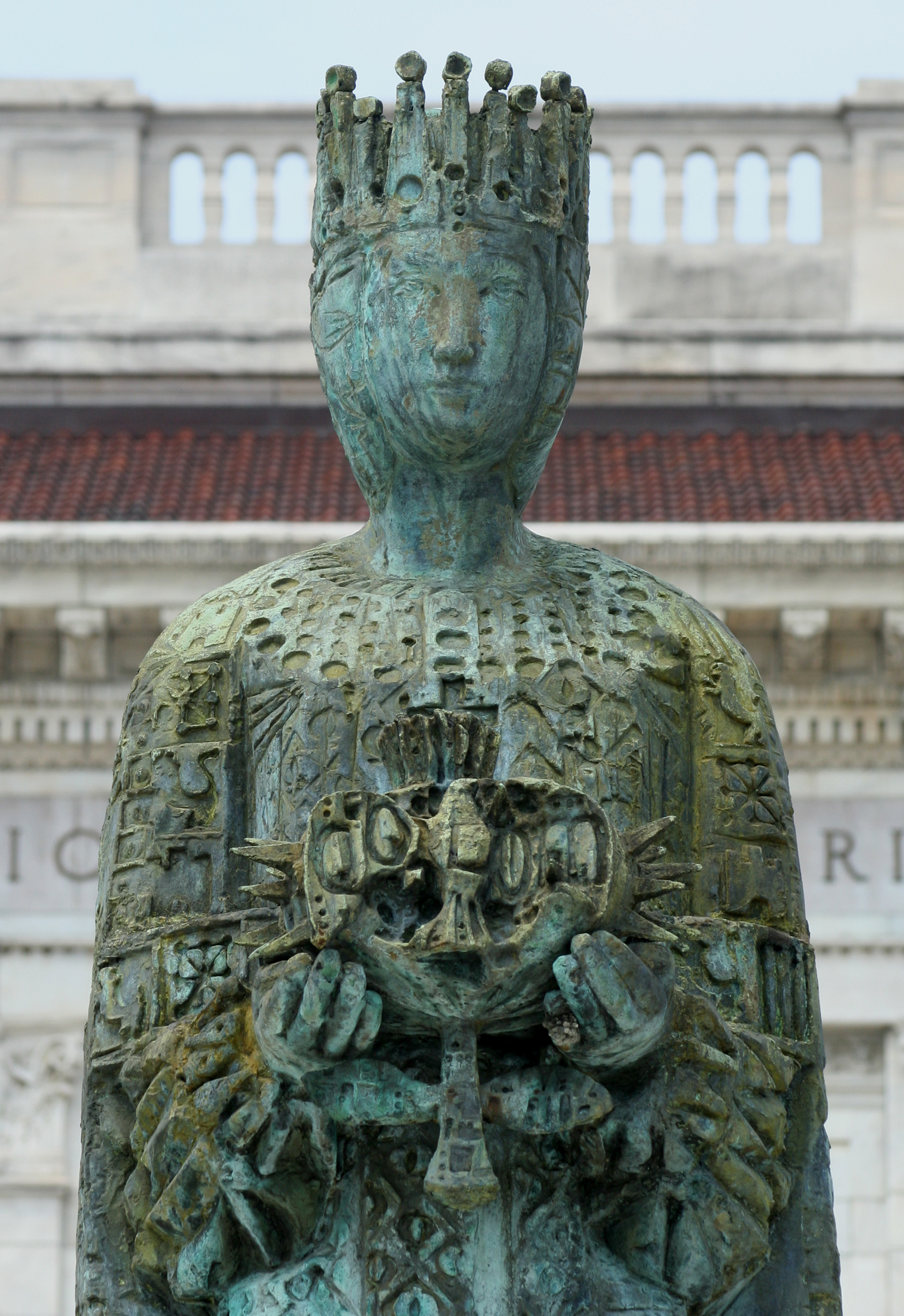
Close-up of the statue

== See also ==
- List of public art in Washington, D.C., Ward 2
- Outdoor sculpture in Washington, D.C.
