= American War Memorial, Gibraltar =

Naval Monument at Gibraltar
- American War Memorial
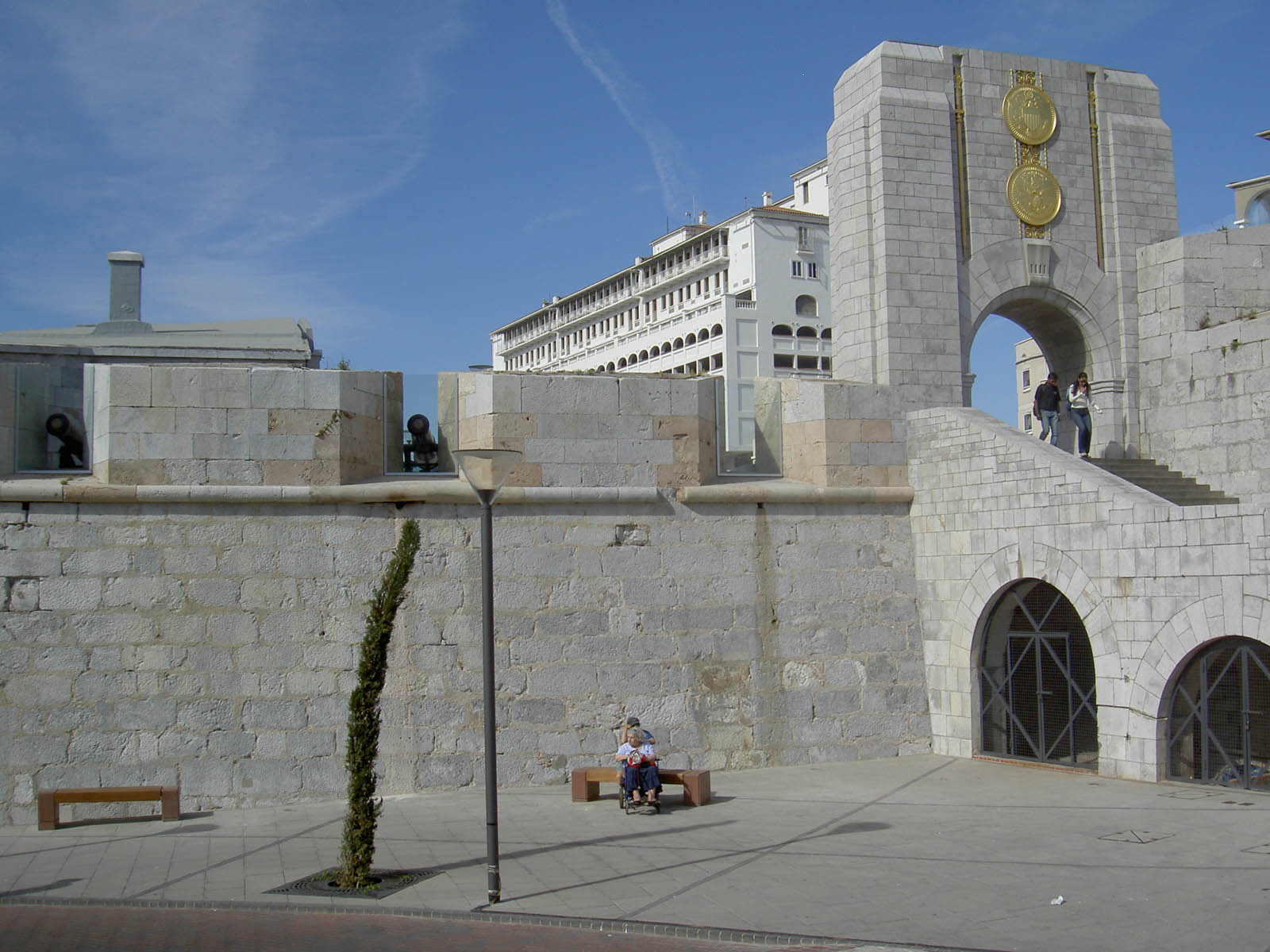
- The American War Memorial in Gibraltar
- Interactive map of Naval Monument at Gibraltar
- Location: Line Wall Road, Gibraltar
- Coordinates: 36.143322°N 5.354450°W
- Designer: Paul Philippe Cret
- Type: Military
- Material: Limestone
- Completion date: 1933
- Opening date: 1937
- Dedicated to: World War I; World War II

The American War Memorial (also known as the American Steps or more formally the Naval Monument at Gibraltar) is a World War I memorial in the British Overseas Territory of Gibraltar. It was built for the American Battle Monuments Commission in 1933, and incorporated into the main city wall, the Line Wall Curtain. It commemorated the successful alliance of the United States and the United Kingdom in their naval exploits in the vicinity of Gibraltar during the Great War. The monument was inaugurated in 1937. Sixty-one years later, in November 1998, the monument was the site of another unveiling ceremony, that of a bronze plaque which commemorated the World War II Allied invasion of North Africa, Operation Torch. That unveiling ceremony was one of a number of events that weekend whose guests included dignitaries from the United Kingdom and the United States.

== Description ==
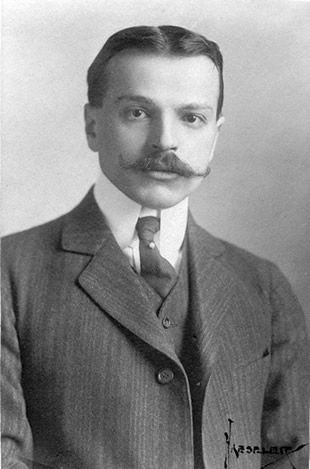
Architect Paul Philippe Cret, 1910

The American War Memorial (pictured at right) is a World War I naval monument located near the north end of Line Wall Road in the British Overseas Territory of Gibraltar, at the southern end of the Iberian Peninsula. More formally known as the Naval Monument at Gibraltar, the memorial and steps were incorporated into the Line Wall Curtain at Prince Albert's Front giving pedestrians access to the lower Reclamation Road, Fish Market Lane, and Queensway. The steps connected the town above with the Royal Navy facilities below. The monument was designed by architect Paul Philippe Cret (1876–1945), a native of France who was a professor at the University of Pennsylvania. Cret (pictured at right) designed the memorial on behalf of the American Battle Monuments Commission. It was constructed between 1932 and 1933. The inscription (link below) over the arch of the memorial indicates that it was "erected by the United States of America to commemorate the achievements and comradeship of the American and British Navies in this vicinity during the World War." On the other side of the masonry arch are two bronze medallions (pictured below) depicting the seals of the United States and of its Department of the Navy. The dolomitic limestone utilised in the construction of the monument came from the Rock of Gibraltar. The memorial is an example of the successful incorporation of a relatively recent work into older, existing architecture.

== Inauguration ==
The formal dedication took place in October 1937, when an American contingent from the American Battle Monuments Commission arrived on the cruiser Raleigh. On the morning of 7 October, Rear Admiral Arthur P. Fairfield, of Raleigh, gave the inaugural address on behalf of General John J. "Black Jack" Pershing. Other speakers included General Sir Charles Harrington, the Governor of Gibraltar; Rear Admiral Alfred Evans, Rear Admiral in charge of Gibraltar; and the American Consul H. O. Williams. The dedication was attended by other military officials, foreign consuls, and American and British soldiers. During the unveiling of the monument, the band of the Royal Norfolk Regiment gave renditions of the national anthems of the United States and the United Kingdom.

== Recent history ==
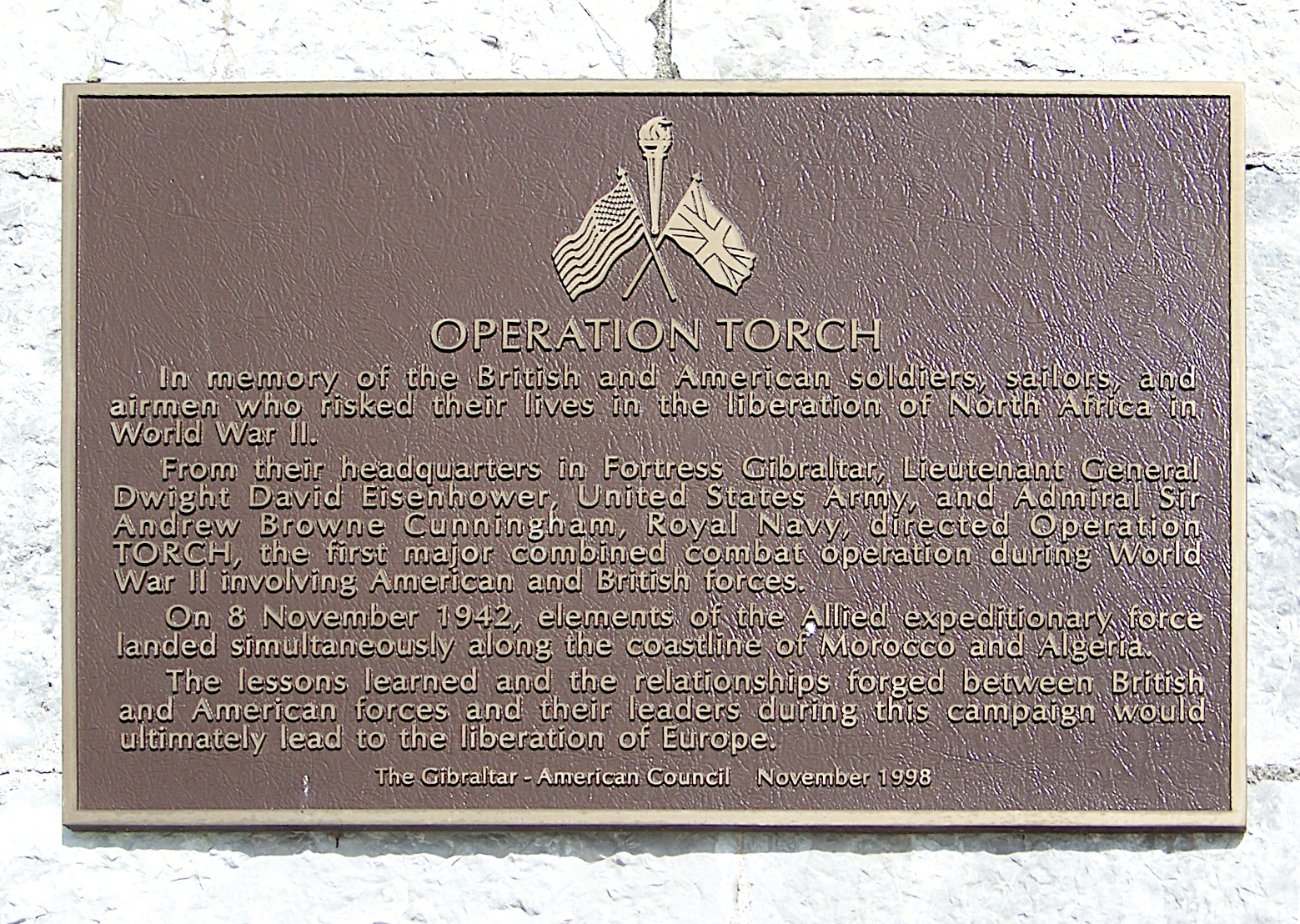
Plaque commemorating Operation Torch on American War Memorial in Gibraltar

On 29 October 1960, the Gibraltar Philatelic Bureau issued a stamp (link below) in tribute to the American War Memorial at Gibraltar.

On 7 November 1998, the Gibraltar-American Council and the Government of Gibraltar commemorated the anniversary of Operation Torch, the World War II Allied invasion of North Africa, with a bronze plaque (pictured at left) at the American War Memorial. General Dwight D. "Ike" Eisenhower (1890–1969), who was headquartered in Gibraltar, had led the invasion in November 1942. The plaque was unveiled by the then Chief Minister of Gibraltar Peter Caruana on the steps of the memorial.

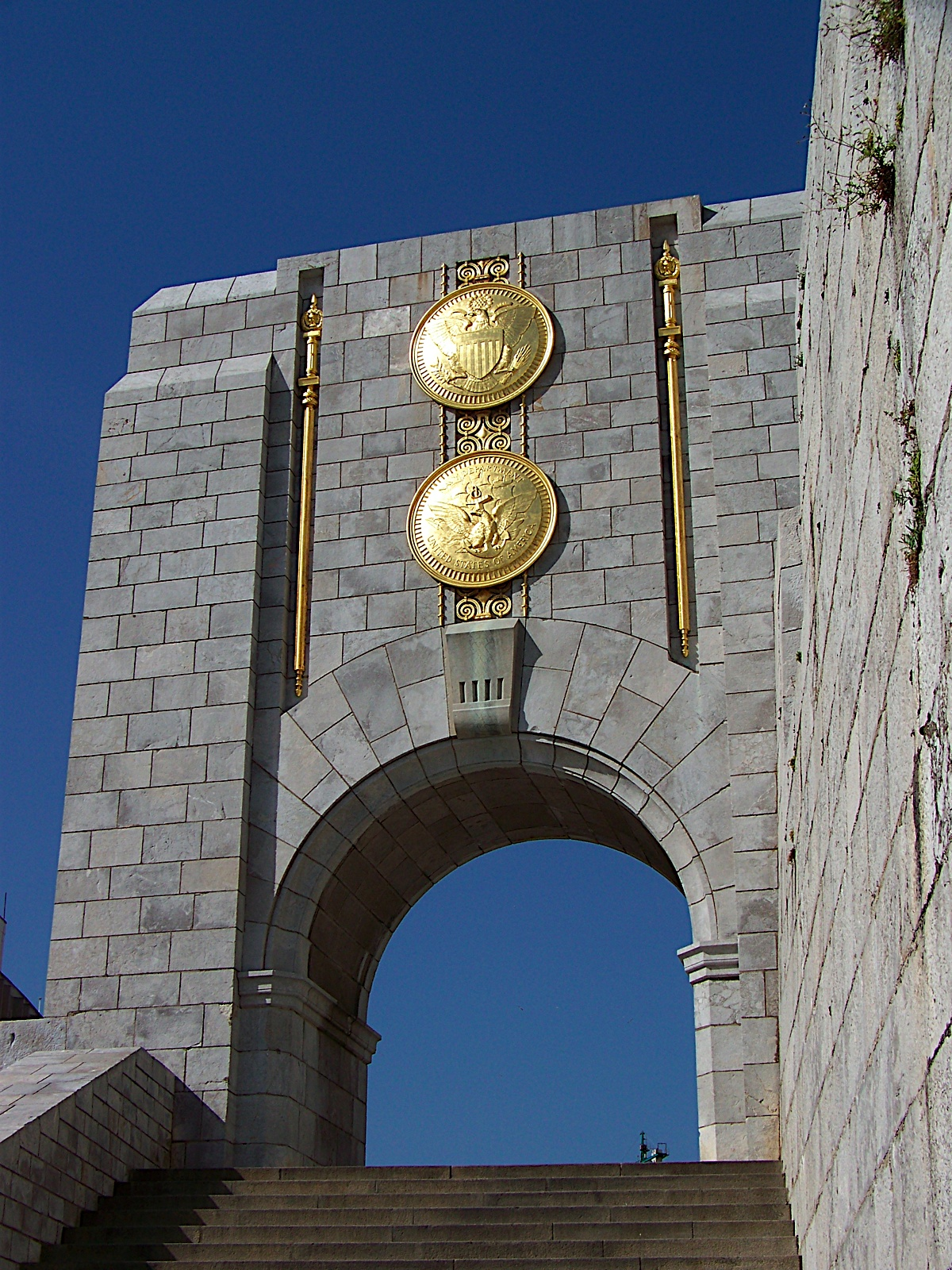
The bronze seals over the arch of the American War Memorial

Other events that weekend included tree-planting ceremonies at two sites, The Mount and The Convent. The Eisenhower Centre was inaugurated, with temporary housing in the Garrison Library. Caruana hosted a lunch at The Mount and a dinner at St. Michael's Cave. Gold commemorative coins were distributed to some of the guests. In addition, the Governor hosted a dinner at The Convent. Overseas guests included Anne Eisenhower Flottl, the granddaughter of President Eisenhower; Winston S. Churchill (1940–2010), the grandson of Prime Minister Sir Winston Churchill (1874–1965); and Mrs. Franklin Roosevelt, the daughter-in-law of President Franklin D. Roosevelt (1882–1945). Senior officers of the United States Army and Navy also attended the events. The USS Mitscher (DDG-57) was at Gibraltar for the anniversary. Members of the Royal British Legion and veterans of the Gibraltar Defence Force who served during Operation Torch were also invited to the ceremony at the American War Memorial. The inscription on the plaque at the monument reads:

OPERATION TORCH – In memory of the British and American soldiers, sailors, and airmen who risked their lives in the liberation of North Africa in World War II. From their headquarters in Fortress Gibraltar, Lieutenant General Dwight David Eisenhower, United States Army, and Admiral Sir Andrew Cunningham, Royal Navy, directed Operation TORCH, the first major combined combat operation during World War II involving American and British forces. On 8 November 1942, elements of the Allied expeditionary force landed simultaneously along the coastline of Morocco and Algeria. The lessons learned and the relationships forged between British and American forces and their leaders during this campaign would ultimately lead to the liberation of Europe. The Gibraltar-American Council November 1998
