= National Memorial Arch =

Memorial arch in Pennsylvania, U.S.

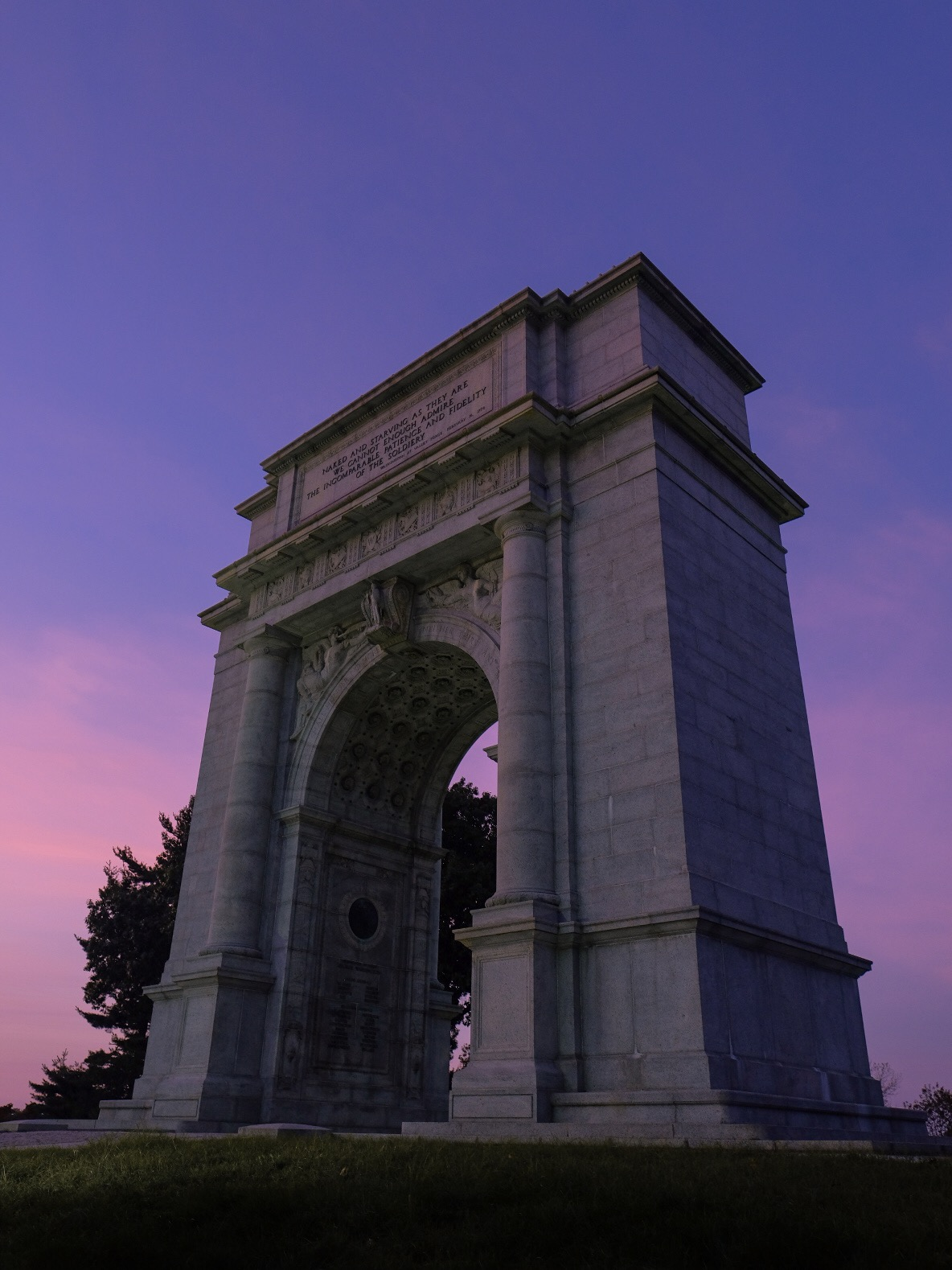
- The arch in 2018
- Location: Valley Forge National Historical Park, Upper Merion Township, Pennsylvania
- Coordinates: 40°05′31″N 75°26′19″W
- Type: Memorial arch
- Beginning date: 1914
- Dedicated date: June 19, 1917
- Dedicated to: George Washington and the Continental Army

The National Memorial Arch is a monument located in Valley Forge National Historical Park of Upper Merion Township, Pennsylvania. The memorial arch honors the arrival of General George Washington and the Continental Army at Valley Forge, which was the site of their military camp during the winter of 1777–78. Construction on the structure began in 1914 and it was dedicated in 1917.

== Overview ==
The Memorial Arch was planned during the height of the post-Civil War memorial boom. During this period of around 50 years, many monuments were planned and built in the United States, many of which are on the National Mall. As a result, the architectural style of the Arch mirrors many of the monuments.

The Memorial Arch is dedicated "to the officers and private soldiers of the Continental Army December 19, 1777 June 19, 1778." The Arch is situated at the top of a hill at the intersection of Gulph Road and Outer Line Drive in Valley Forge National Historical Park.

The United States National Memorial Arch was designed by Paul Philippe Cret with hopes its styles would mirror a simplified version of the Triumphal Arch of Titus in Rome (marked the capture of Jerusalem by Emperor Titus in A.D. 70). Paul Philippe Cret was a professor at the University of Pennsylvania and was originally from France, studying at the Ecole des Beaux Arts. In classical architecture, the triumphal arch was erected to honor generals and emperors. The United States National Memorial Arch does so by offering a national tribute to George Washington and his army. The Arch stands 60 feet tall.

In 1907, the Valley Forge Park Commission planned the construction of two arches, the Washington Arch at the Valley Creek entrance, and a von Steuben Arch at the park entrance on the opposite end. Both arches were designed to serve as entrance gates to welcome park visitors as well as monuments honoring the two generals and their troops. In 1908, Congressman Irving P. Wanger introduced a bill to Congress to get funding for the two arches. The two arches were given a bill of $50,000 each, which was approved by the U.S. House of Representatives in March 1910, but failed in the U.S. Senate later that year. Instead, a bill for one arch was approved in October 1910 for $100,000. Funds were distributed in 1911, and construction began in 1914. The arch was formally dedicated to George Washington and his troops on June 19, 1917. When the National Memorial Arch was dedicated on June 19, 1917, patriotism in the U.S. was strong due to ongoing battles in World War I which engendered significant interest in the memorial. A train of Pullman cars brought members of Congress to Valley Forge on the day of the ceremony, where they sat upon platforms decorated with red-white-and-blue bunting in a celebration of patriotism. Pennsylvania Gov. Martin Brumbaugh spoke of the spirit of Valley Forge and its importance during hard times.

To ensure the arch was still in good shape, a restoration project began in 1996 headed by the Freemasons of Pennsylvania. The project had a budget of $1.5 million and provided nine tons of stabilizing steel to ensure the monument was structurally sound. The restoration project ended in 1997. The Valley Forge Historical Park attracts one million yearly visitors, and the National Memorial Arch draws about 300,000 of these. The arch is currently maintained by the Valley Forge National Historical Park, one of 433 units of the National Park Service.

== Inscriptions ==
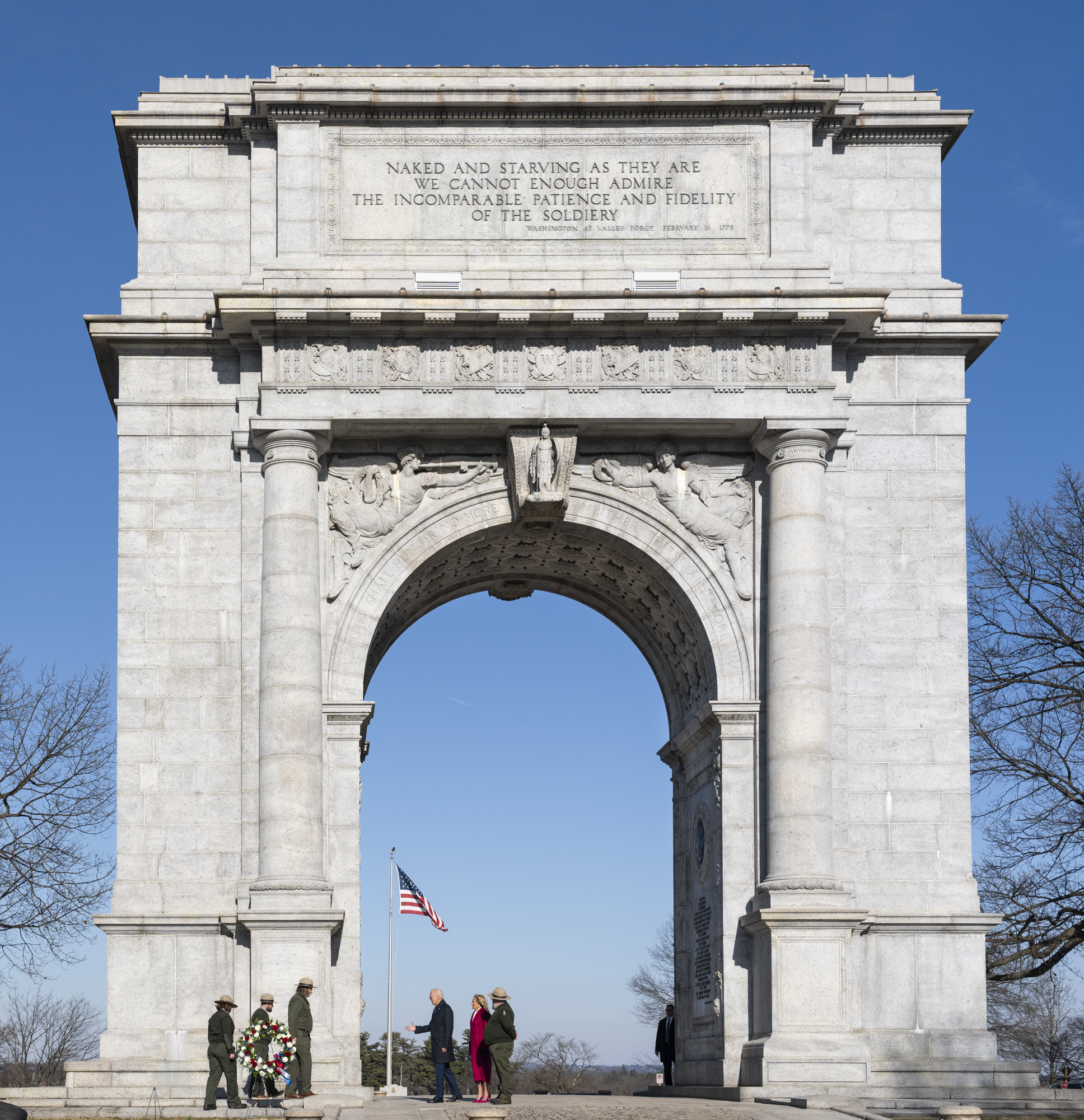
National Memorial Arch inscription: Naked and starving as they are We cannot enough admire The incomparable Patience and Fidelity of the Soldiery –George Washington

The National Memorial Arch is inscribed in many locations. On the front of the memorial is a quote from George Washington's letter to Governor George Clinton while at Valley Forge.

Naked and starving as they are

We cannot enough admire

The incomparable Patience and Fidelity

of the Soldiery

Located within the arch of the monument is a quotation from a speech given by Henry Armitt Brown, an American writer and orator. Brown gave his speech at the 100 year anniversary of Valley Forge.

And here in this place of sacrifice, in this vale of humiliation, in this valley of the shadow, of that death out of which the life of America rose, regenerate and free, let us believe, with an abiding faith, that to them, union will seem as dear, and liberty as sweet, and progress as glorious, they were to our fathers, and are to you and me, and that the institutions which have made us happy, preserved by the virtue of our children, shall bless the remotest generation to the time to come

Also located on the back of the monument are the last names of the American generals during the Revolutionary War:

Commander in Chief

George Washington

Major Generals

De Kalb Mifflin

Greene Steuben

Lafayette Stirling

Lee Sullivan

Brigadier Generals

Armstrong Patterson

Duportail Poor

Glover Scott

Huntington Smallwood

Knox Varnum

Learned Wayne

McIntosh Weedon

Maxwell Woodford

Muhlenberg Pulaski
