= Flanders Field American Cemetery and Memorial =

ABMC World War I cemetery in Waregem, Belgium

Coordinates: 50°52′25″N 3°27′14″E

- American Battle Monuments Commission
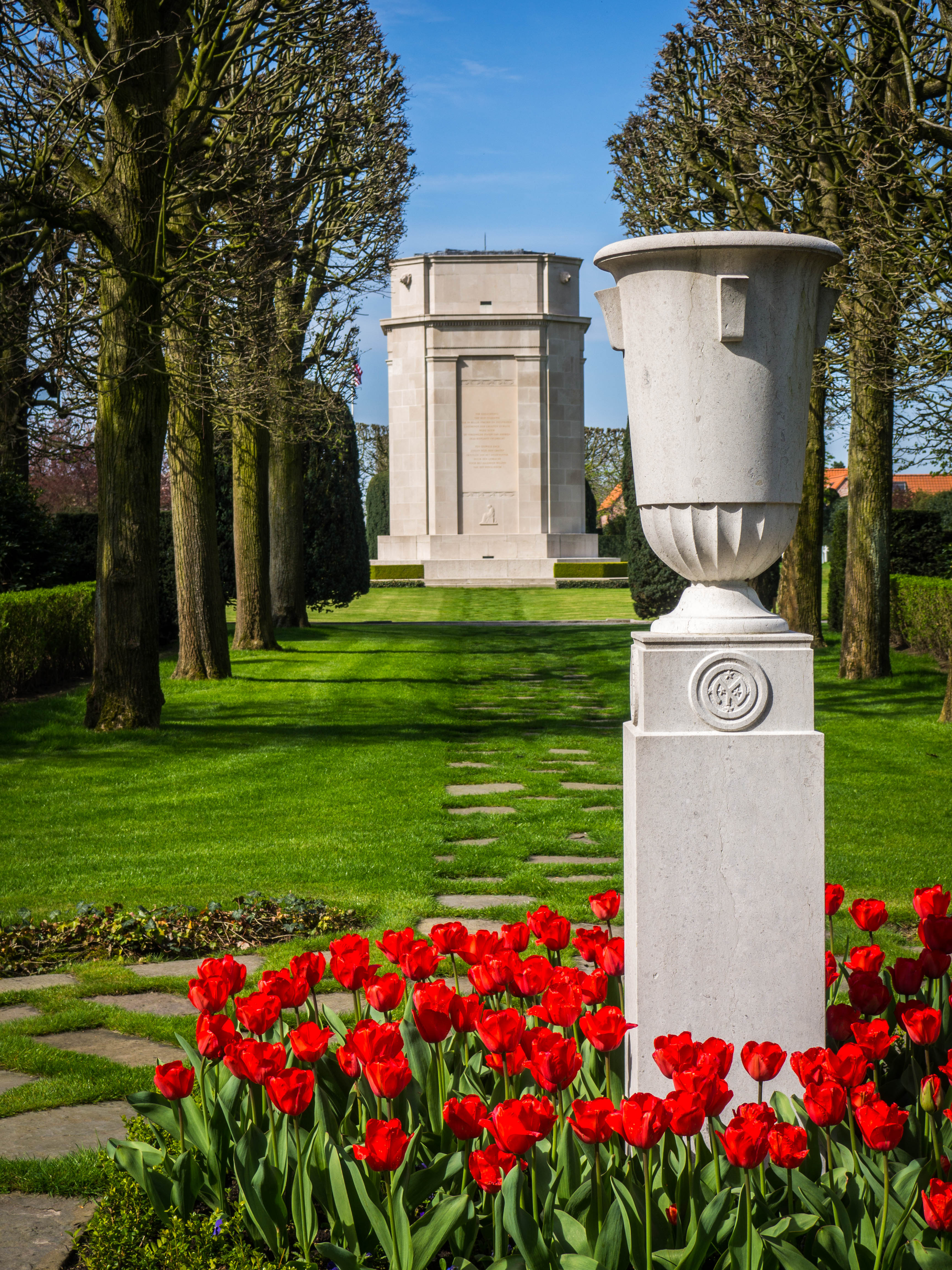
- An ornamental urn and the chapel at the Flanders Field American Cemetery.
- Used for those deceased from 1917 to 1919.
- Location: Waregem, Belgium
- Total burials: 368 interred (of which 21 are Unknowns) and 43 listed as missing in action.

Flanders Field American Cemetery and Memorial is a World War I cemetery in the city of Waregem, Belgium. Originally a temporary battlefield burial ground, Flanders Field American Cemetery later became the only permanent American World War I cemetery in Belgium. The Flanders Field American Cemetery commemorates 411 service members of the United States Armed Forces of which 368 are interred. The Walls of the Missing inside the chapel venerates 43 missing service members.

This cemetery is administered by the American Battle Monuments Commission (ABMC) and occupies a six-acre (about 2.6 hectares) site. The government of Belgium granted its free use as a permanent burial ground in perpetuity without charge or taxation.

At the center of the cemetery is the small memorial chapel of white Pouillenay stone. Above its bronze entrance door is engraved:

Greet Them Ever With Grateful Hearts

On three of the outer walls, the dedicatory inscription appears in French, Flemish and English:

This Chapel Has Been Erected By The United States Of America In Memory Of Her Soldiers Who Fought And Died In Belgium During The World War. These Graves Are The Permanent And Visible Symbol Of The Heroic Devotion With Which They Gave Their Lives To The Common Cause Of Humanity

Beneath the three versions of the inscription, sculptured bas-relief figures symbolizing Grief, Remembrance, and History respectively appear.

Located inside the chapel is an altar of Grand Antique (black and white) marble. On the front of the altar is inscribed:

I Will Ransom Them From The Power Of The Grave
I Will Redeem Them From Death

Above it carved on a rose-tinted marble panel is a Crusader's sword outlined in gold. On either side of the altar are bronze candelabras depicting cannons Flags of the United States, Belgium, France, Great Britain, and Italy also flank the altar. On the side walls of the chapel, panels of rose St. George marble carry the names of 43 American soldiers who lost their lives in Belgium and sleep in unknown graves. Above the names is the Great Seal of the United States and the inscription:

In Memory Of Those American Soldiers Who Fought In This Region And Who Sleep In Unknown Graves

The interior of the chapel is enhanced by the mosaic ceiling, which depicts a lighted oil lamp under the stars of Heaven with doves of peace flying toward the light.

The graves area consists of four rectangular plots. Each plot contains 92 graves marked with white Carrara marble headstones set in four rows. Eight Stars of David mark the graves of those of Jewish faith. 21 of the 368 graves in the cemetery are of Unknowns. The majority of the soldiers memorialized at the Flanders Field American Cemetery represent four main divisions who fought in Belgium during the final weeks of the war. The 27th New York and the 30th Old Hickory Divisions saw action near Ypres from 18 August to 4 September 1918. The 37th Buckeye and 91st Wild West Divisions pushed west from Waregem and across the Scheldt River at Oudenaarde from 30 October 1918 until the Armistice on 11 November 1918. The Flanders Field American Cemetery is situated on a battlefield where the 91st Division suffered many casualties in securing the nearby wooded area called "Spitaals Bosschen".

The Flanders Field American Cemetery takes its name from the poem "In Flanders Fields" written by Canadian physician, Lieutenant Colonel John McCrae. McCrae wrote the poem near Ypres after attending the funeral of his friend, Lieutenant Alexis Helmer.

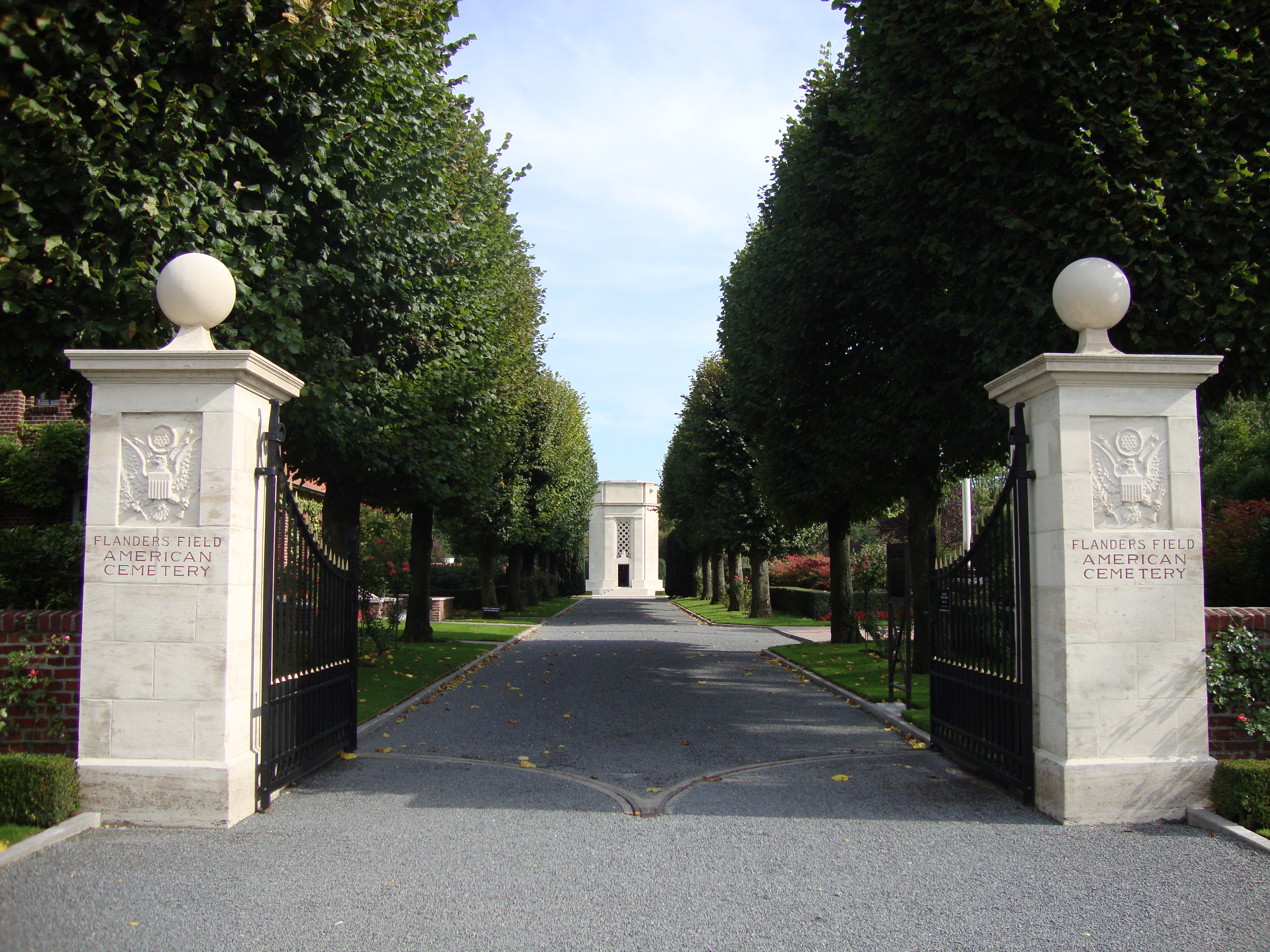
Entrance to the Flanders Field American Cemetery

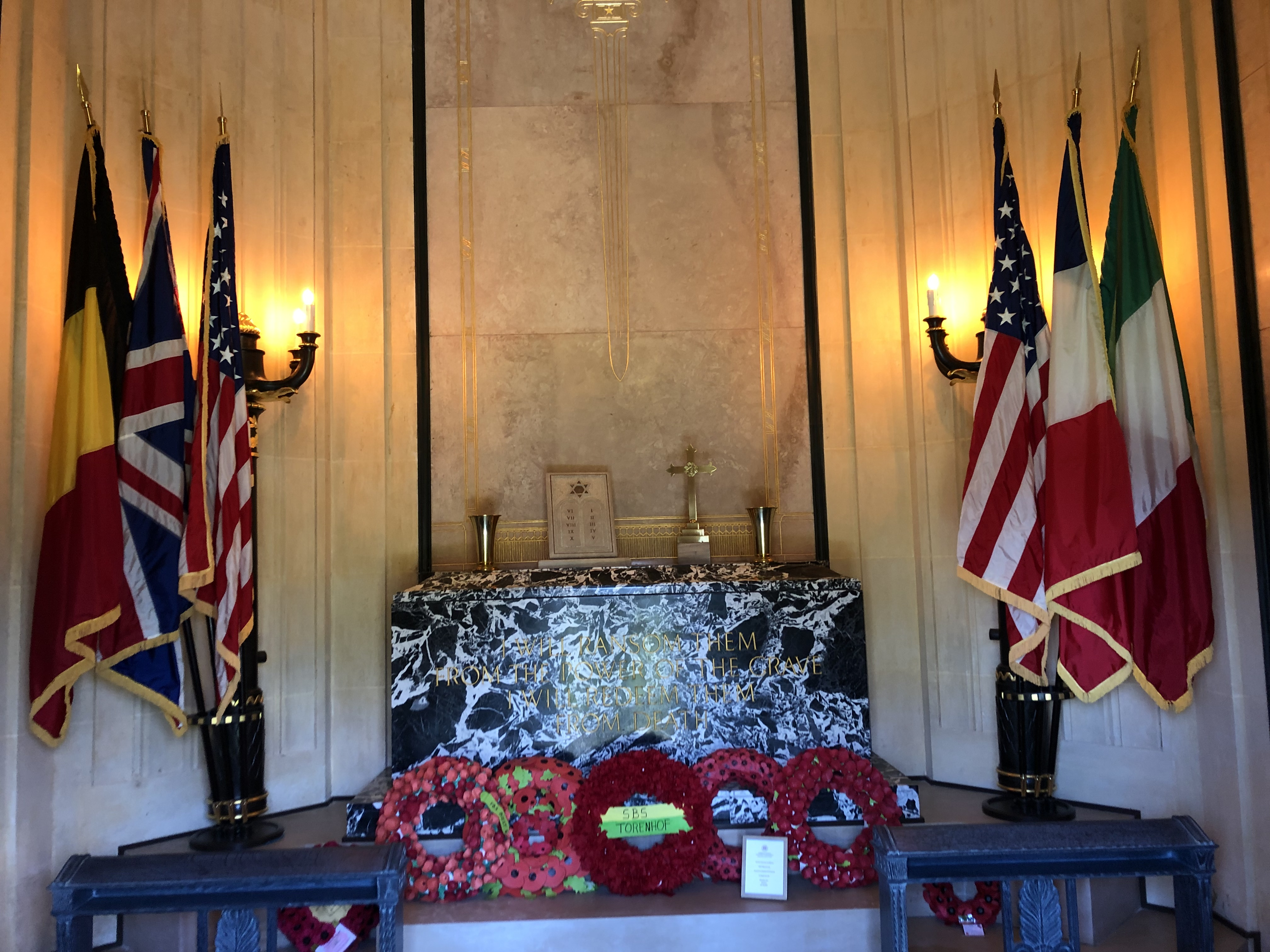
The interior of the chapel at the Flanders Field American Cemetery.

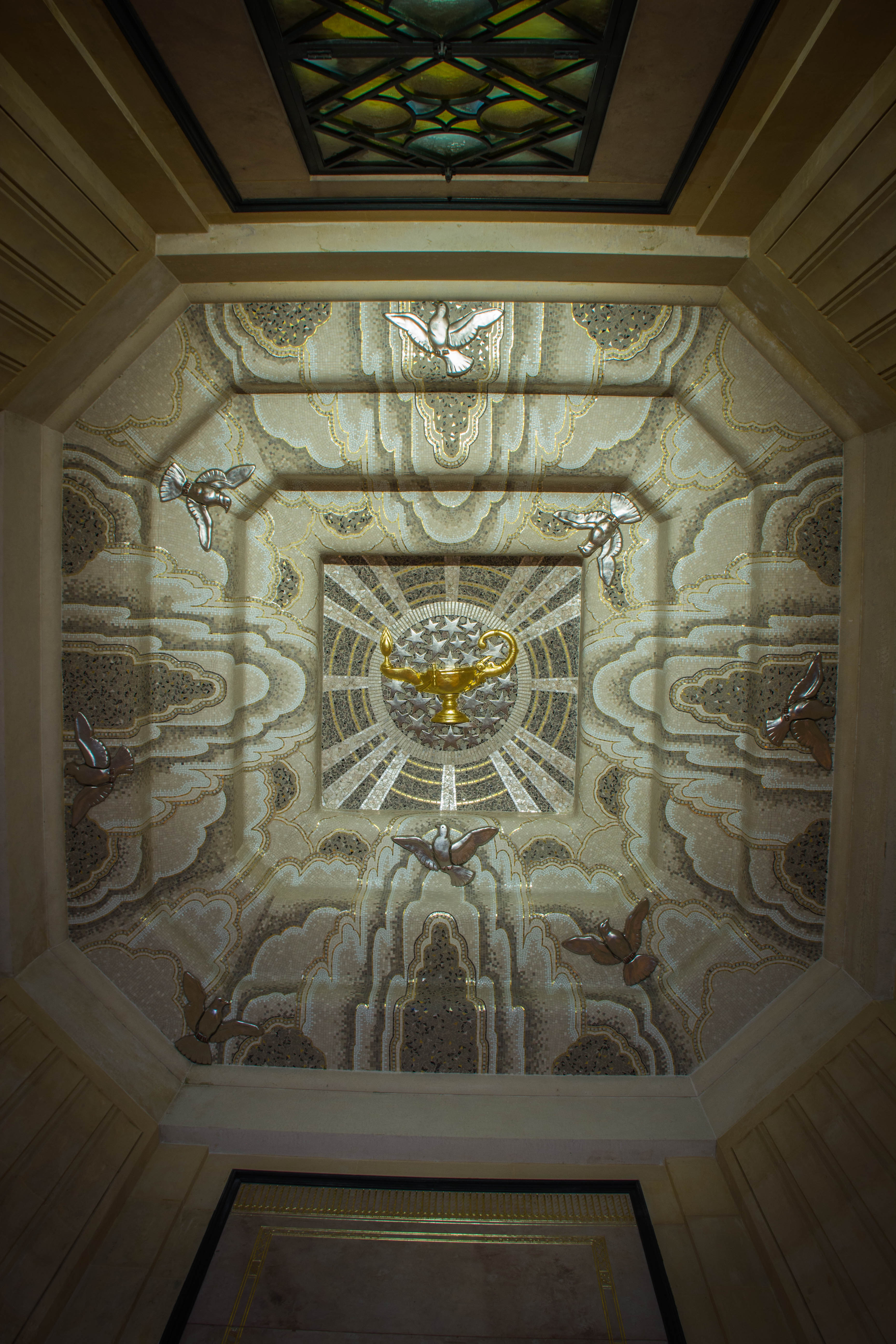
The chapel ceiling mosaic at the Flanders Field American Cemetery.
