= Pan American Union Building =

Headquarters for the Organization of American States in Washington, D.C.

- U.S. National Register of Historic Places
- U.S. National Historic Landmark
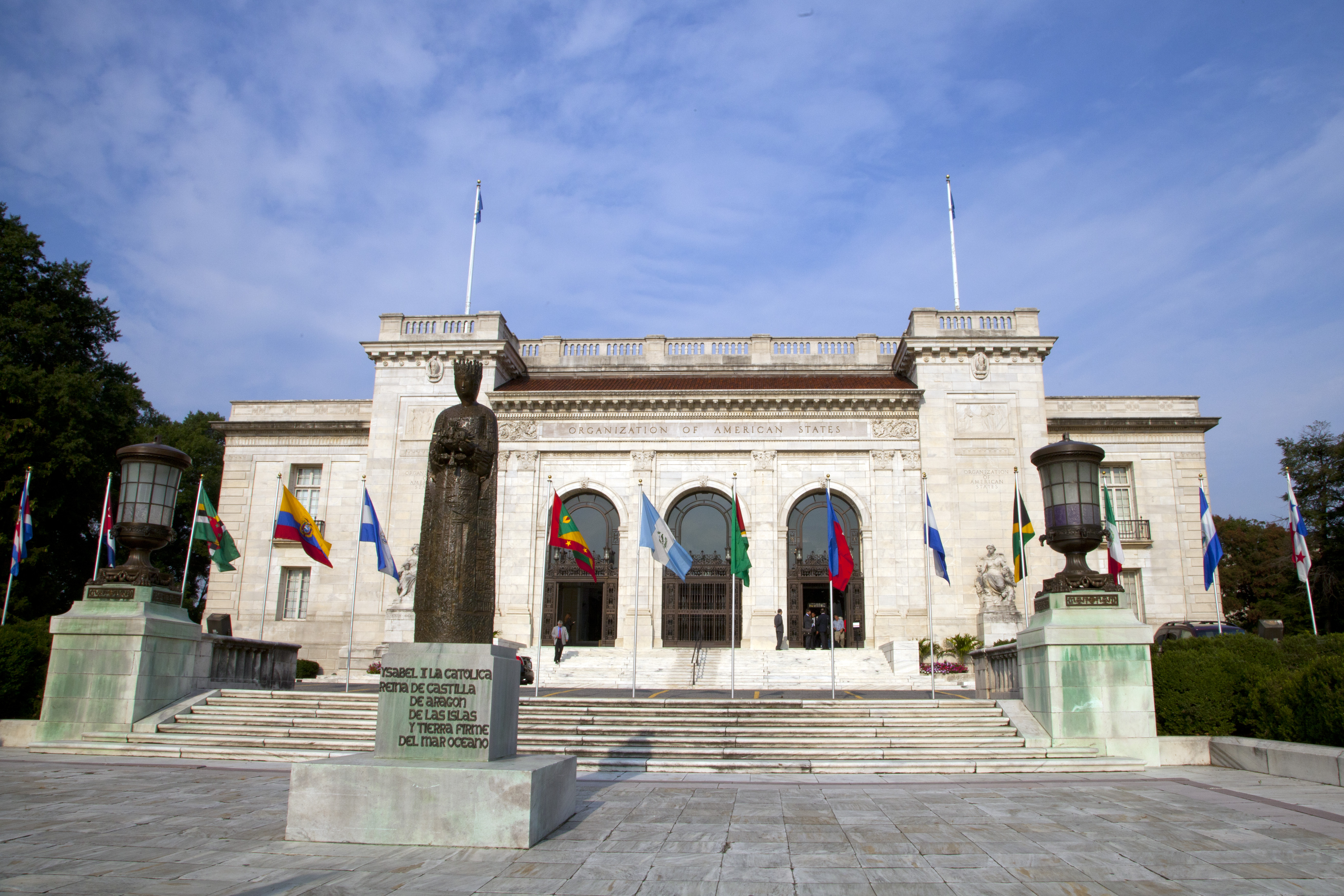
- Organization of American States headquarters building, with the Statue of Isabella I in front

- Location within Central Washington, D.C. Location within the District of Columbia
- Location: 17th Street NW between C Street and Constitution Avenue NW, Washington, D.C.
- Coordinates: 38.89288°N 77.04026°W
- Built: 1908–1910
- Architect: Paul P. Cret and Albert Kelsey
- NRHP reference No.: 69000298, 10000625

Significant dates
- Added to NRHP: June 4, 1969
- Designated NHL: January 13, 2021

The Pan American Union Building is the headquarters for the Organization of American States. It is located at 17th Street Northwest, between C Street and Constitution Avenue, in Northwest, Washington, D.C.

== History ==
The cornerstone was laid on May 11, 1908, by Theodore Roosevelt, Elihu Root, and Andrew Carnegie (who largely financed the building's construction) on the former site of the Van Ness Mansion. The building was dedicated on April 26, 1910.

It was designed in the style of a Greek temple, with large exterior stairways leading to palatial bronze gates. The building's roof is covered with Ludowici tiles in a blend of reds.

In 1919, the initial meeting of the International Labour Organization was held in the building.

Between 1921 and 1922, the building was used for committee and subcommittee hearings throughout the Washington Naval Conference while closely guarded by marines with fixed bayonets.

The building was added to the National Register of Historic Places in 1969, and was designated a National Historic Landmark in 2021, for its architecture and its role in international diplomacy.

The Torrijos–Carter Treaties, handing control of the Panama Canal from the United States to the Republic of Panama, were signed in the building.
