= Gibraltar Cross of Sacrifice =

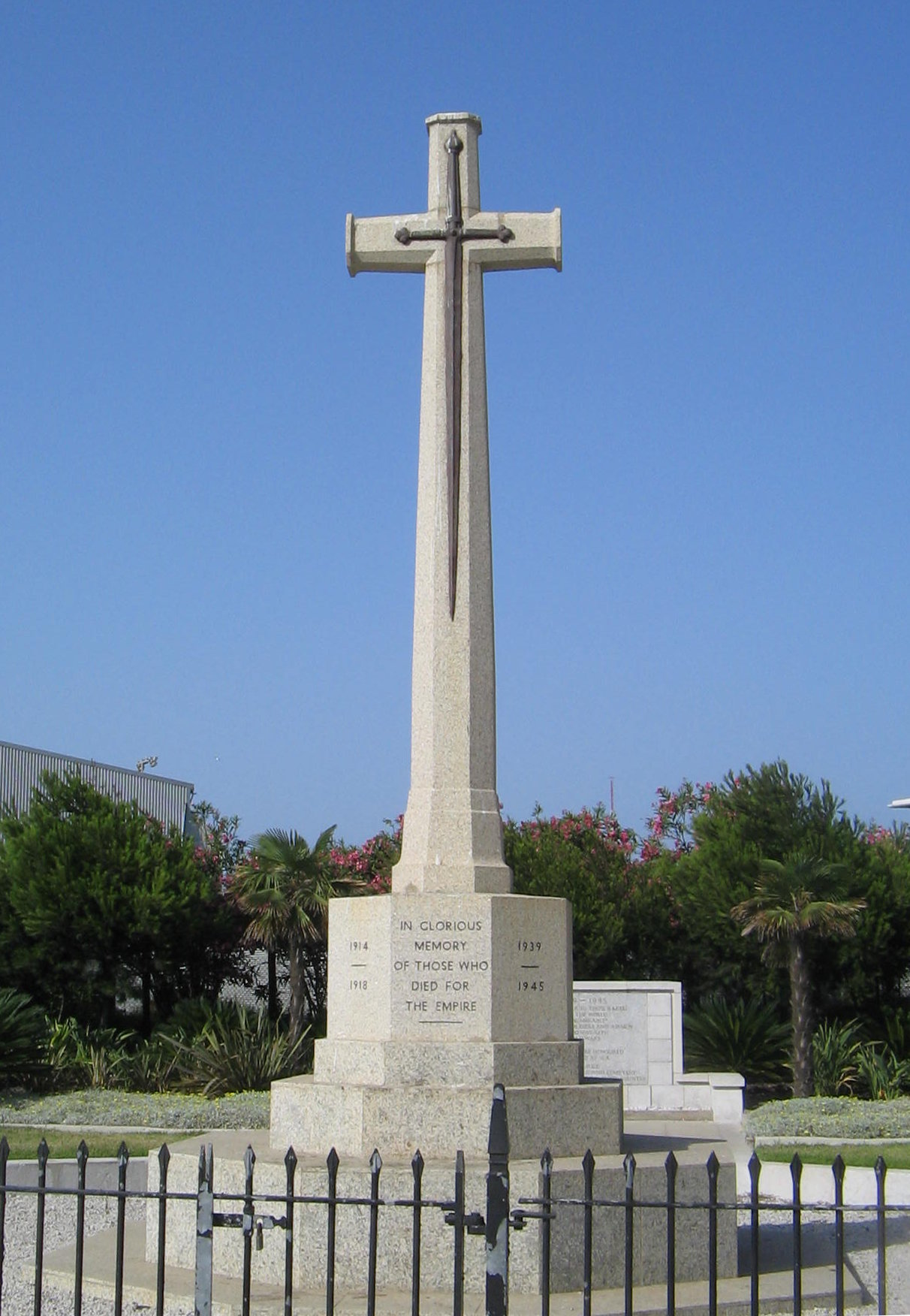
- Gibraltar Cross of Sacrifice
- Interactive map of Gibraltar Cross of Sacrifice
- Location: Corner of Winston Churchill Avenue and Devil's Tower Road, Gibraltar
- Coordinates: 36°08′56″N 5°20′56″W
- Designer: Sir Reginald Blomfield
- Type: Cross of Sacrifice
- Material: Cornish Granite, Bronze
- Opening date: Armistice Day 1922
- Dedicated to: The Dead of World War I

The Gibraltar Cross of Sacrifice is a war memorial in the British Overseas Territory of Gibraltar. It is located west of North Front Cemetery, at the junction of Winston Churchill Avenue and Devil's Tower Road. The Cross of Sacrifice was designed by Sir Reginald Blomfield in 1917, and his monument is found in numerous Commonwealth War Graves Commission cemeteries. The cross in Gibraltar was erected by the Royal Engineers for the commission, and unveiled on Armistice Day 1922. The British Pathé film recorded at the dedication ceremony that day represents the first motion picture made in Gibraltar. The Gibraltar Cross of Sacrifice served as the focus of Remembrance Sunday ceremonies in Gibraltar until 2009, at which time the location was changed to the Gibraltar War Memorial.

== Location and design ==
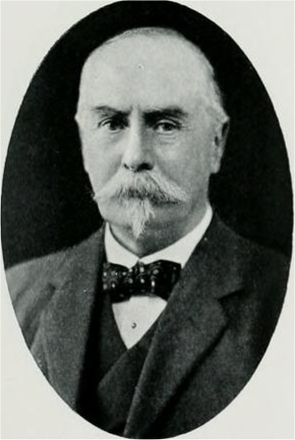
Sir Reginald Blomfield

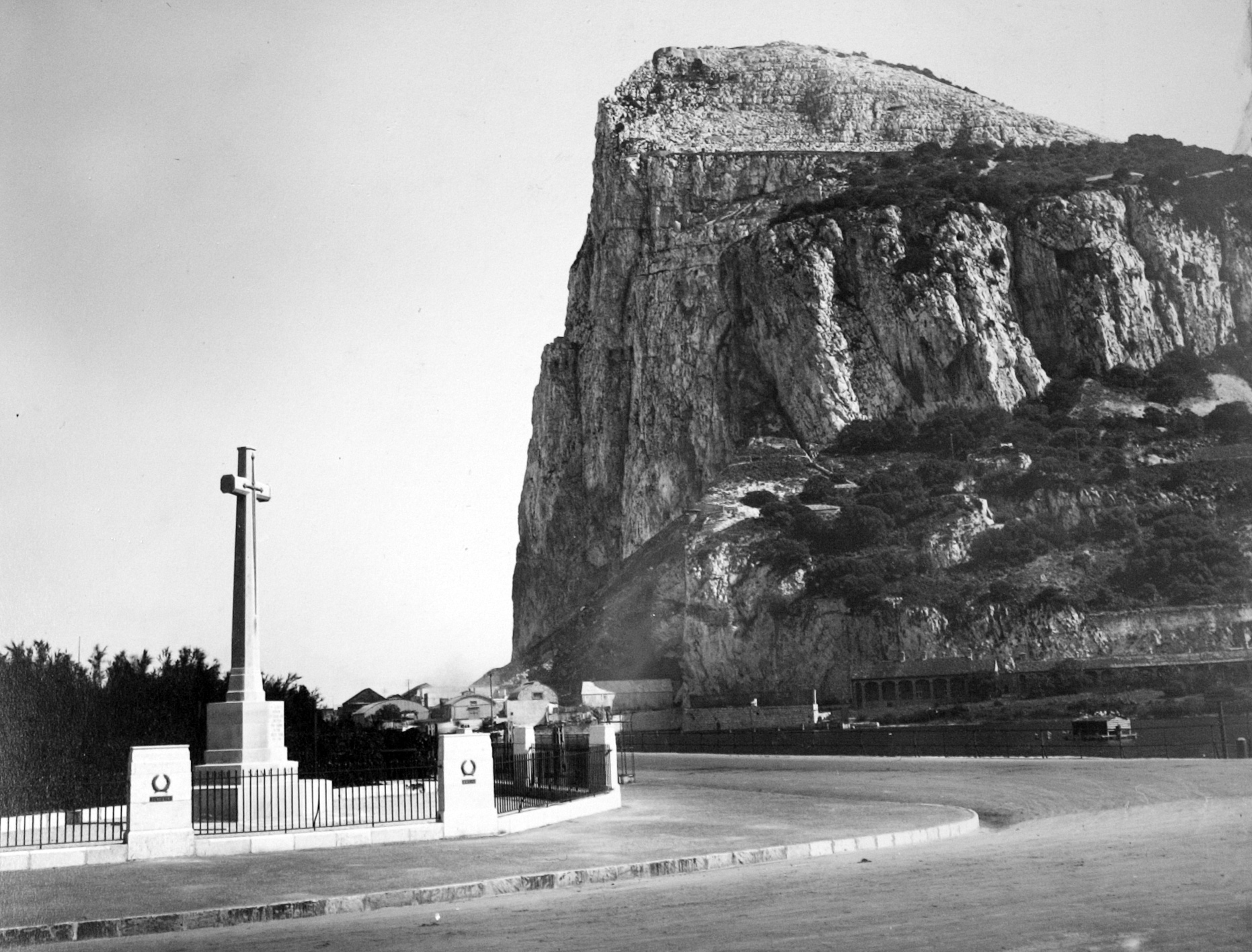
Gibraltar Cross of Sacrifice in the 1920s

The Gibraltar Cross of Sacrifice is a monument in Gibraltar, the British Overseas Territory at the southern end of the Iberian Peninsula. The memorial was originally located within North Front Cemetery. Rebuilt and relocated after World War II, it is currently positioned, along with the Gibraltar Memorial, in northern Gibraltar, in a fenced area west of the North Front Cemetery. The monuments are at the northeast corner of Winston Churchill Avenue and Devil's Tower Road, adjacent to the sundial roundabout. Both of the war memorials are connected by paths to a central inscribed panel.

The Imperial War Graves Commission (later the Commonwealth War Graves Commission) was established during the First World War to discover, identify, and inter with military honours the remains of British Empire military personnel who died during war.

During the First World War, prominent architects were requested by the then Imperial War Graves Commission to submit designs for monuments to be erected in numerous cemeteries. The Cross of Sacrifice, designed by Sir Reginald Blomfield in 1917, was chosen by the commission. The selection of Blomfield's design was made in part "to emphasize the military character of the cemetery." The monument is found in Commonwealth War Graves Commission cemeteries with fifty or more interments. The cross is usually sculpted in granite, sandstone, or limestone. A bronze sword, described by Rudyard Kipling as "a stark sword brooding on the bosom of the cross," is mounted on the front of the monument, directed downward; together with a crosspiece, it forms another cross. A tall monument, the Cross of Sacrifice measures from 4.5 to 9 metres (15 to 30 ft) in height, and usually is positioned on an octagonal base.

== Construction and inauguration ==
The Gibraltar Cross of Sacrifice was constructed of Cornish granite, and erected by the Royal Engineers for the Imperial War Graves Commission after the First World War. The memorial was unveiled on Armistice Day 1922 by the Governor of Gibraltar, General Sir Horace Lockwood Smith-Dorrien. The ceremony dedicating the Cross of Sacrifice in 1922 was filmed by British Pathé. The title indicates: "In the Shadow of 'The Rock' – Navy and Army mute at impressive ceremony at dedication of Gibraltar's War Memorial." However, the intertitle reveals that: "These pictures are unique in being the first cinema pictures ever taken on the 'Rock of Gibraltar'." Therefore, the brief motion picture obtained at the dedication ceremony of the Gibraltar Cross of Sacrifice in 1922 represented the first film ever made in Gibraltar.

At the octagonal base of the monument, the dates "1914 – 1918" and "1939 – 1945" are noted. There is the further inscription: "In Glorious Memory Of Those Who Died For The Empire." A plaque in the fenced enclosure is inscribed with: "Erected By The Royal Engineers For The Imperial War Graves Commission And Unveiled On Armistice Day 1922 By H. E. Gen. Sir H. L. Smith-Dorrien GCB-GCMG-DSO Governor and Commander-In-Chief Gibraltar." The Cornish granite panel in the centre of the enclosure bears the inscription:

1914–1918 1939–1945 The Cross In This Forecourt Is Similar To Those Raised In War Cemeteries Throughout The World In Grateful And Undying Remembrance Of The Sacrifice Made By Sailors Soldiers And Airmen From All Parts Of The Commonwealth Who Died During Two World Wars

The Gibraltar Memorial, which is adjacent to the Cross of Sacrifice, lists the names of seven soldiers who died during World War I and another 91 who lost their lives in World War II.

== Later history ==
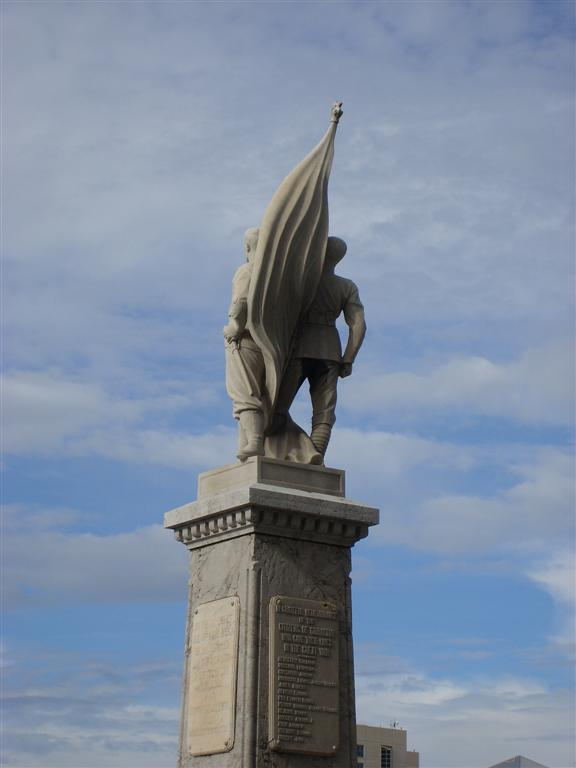
Remembrance Sunday ceremonies have been held at the Gibraltar War Memorial since 2009.

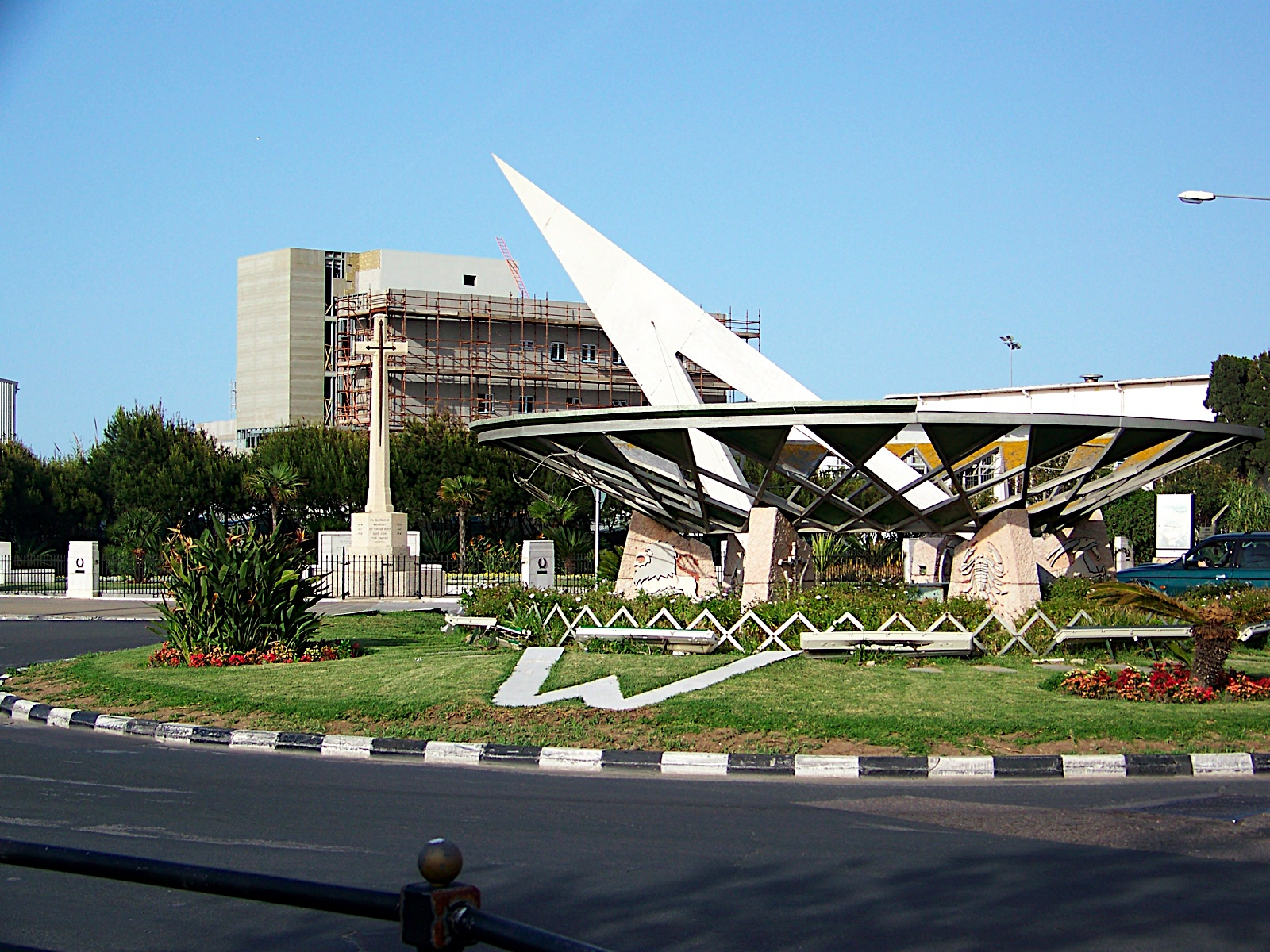
Gibraltar Cross of Sacrifice adjacent to sundial roundabout at Winston Churchill Avenue and Devil's Tower Road

The Cross of Sacrifice was taken down in 1941 during World War II "for military reasons". After the war, it was found to have been badly damaged by erosion. A new cross was erected, but as the original location was not available the new cross was erected in its current location west of the cemetery.

Remembrance Sunday, the second Sunday of November, is observed annually in Gibraltar, with a ceremony that until 2009 was customarily held at the Gibraltar Cross of Sacrifice. It commemorates all of those who have given their lives in war. The ceremony held in 2004 illustrates the tradition of Remembrance Sunday in Gibraltar. On 14 November 2004, the ceremony at the Cross of Sacrifice was led by the Governor of Gibraltar, who read the Bidding. Members of the Royal Gibraltar Regiment fired a salute from Princess Caroline's Battery. This was followed by a two-minute period of silence, and a second gun salute. A parade was also scheduled for the day, with participation of the British Forces Gibraltar and members of the Gibraltar and Estepona branches of the Royal British Legion. The Last Post was played, and remembrance poppy wreaths were laid at the base of the monument by Governor Sir Francis Richards, the Chief Minister of Gibraltar Peter Caruana, and members of military and civil groups. After a short service, the ceremony ended with Reveille and the National Anthem. Similarly, on 9 November 2008, Remembrance Sunday was observed with the customary ceremony at the Cross of Sacrifice.

However, 2009 brought with it a change of venue for Remembrance Sunday ceremonies. The reason given for the change was the ongoing roadwork near the Cross of Sacrifice. On Remembrance Sunday, 8 November 2009, the annual ceremony and parade were held at the Gibraltar War Memorial, also known as the British War Memorial. Poppy wreaths were placed on a temporary frame at the base of the monument on Line Wall Road, near Gibraltar City Hall. Remembrance Sunday ceremonies were also held at the Gibraltar War Memorial the following two years, on 14 November 2010 and 13 November 2011. Future Remembrance Sundays will fall on 11 November 2012, 10 November 2013, 9 November 2014, and 8 November 2015.

Gibraltar celebrated its tercentenary anniversary of British rule in 2004. Some of the veterans who had served there were invited to Gibraltar that year. The July 2004 schedule of events for the veterans included a memorial service at the Cross of Sacrifice that was also attended by the Royal British Legion.

The Cross of Sacrifice has given its name to the adjacent roundabout, which is also referred to as the sundial roundabout.
