= Paignton Cemetery =

Cemetery in Devon, England

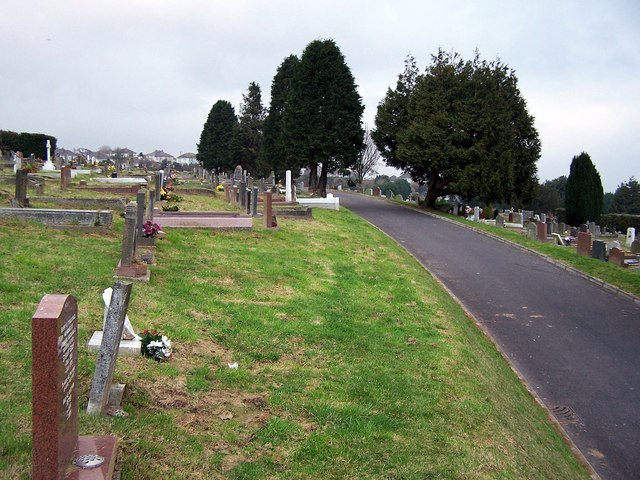
- A section of the cemetery

Details
- Location: Paignton
- Country: England
- Coordinates: 50.437197°N 3.580771°W
- Find a Grave: Paignton Cemetery

Paignton Cemetery is a burial ground situated within the town of Paignton, Devon, England.

== Commonwealth War Graves ==
The cemetery contains 40 burials of Commonwealth service personnel from the First World War (including one unidentified Royal Navy sailor) and 43 graves from the Second World War. Just within the Ailescombe Road entrance there is a Cross of Sacrifice of the Commonwealth War Graves Commission erected to commemorate the dead of the First World War.

== The Torquay and Paignton Hebrew Congregation Cemetery ==
There is a section of the cemetery devoted to Jewish burials situated off Ailescombe Road. There are approximately 90 people interred in this section.
