= Cross of Sacrifice =

War memorial design by Sir Reginald Blomfield

- Commonwealth of Nations
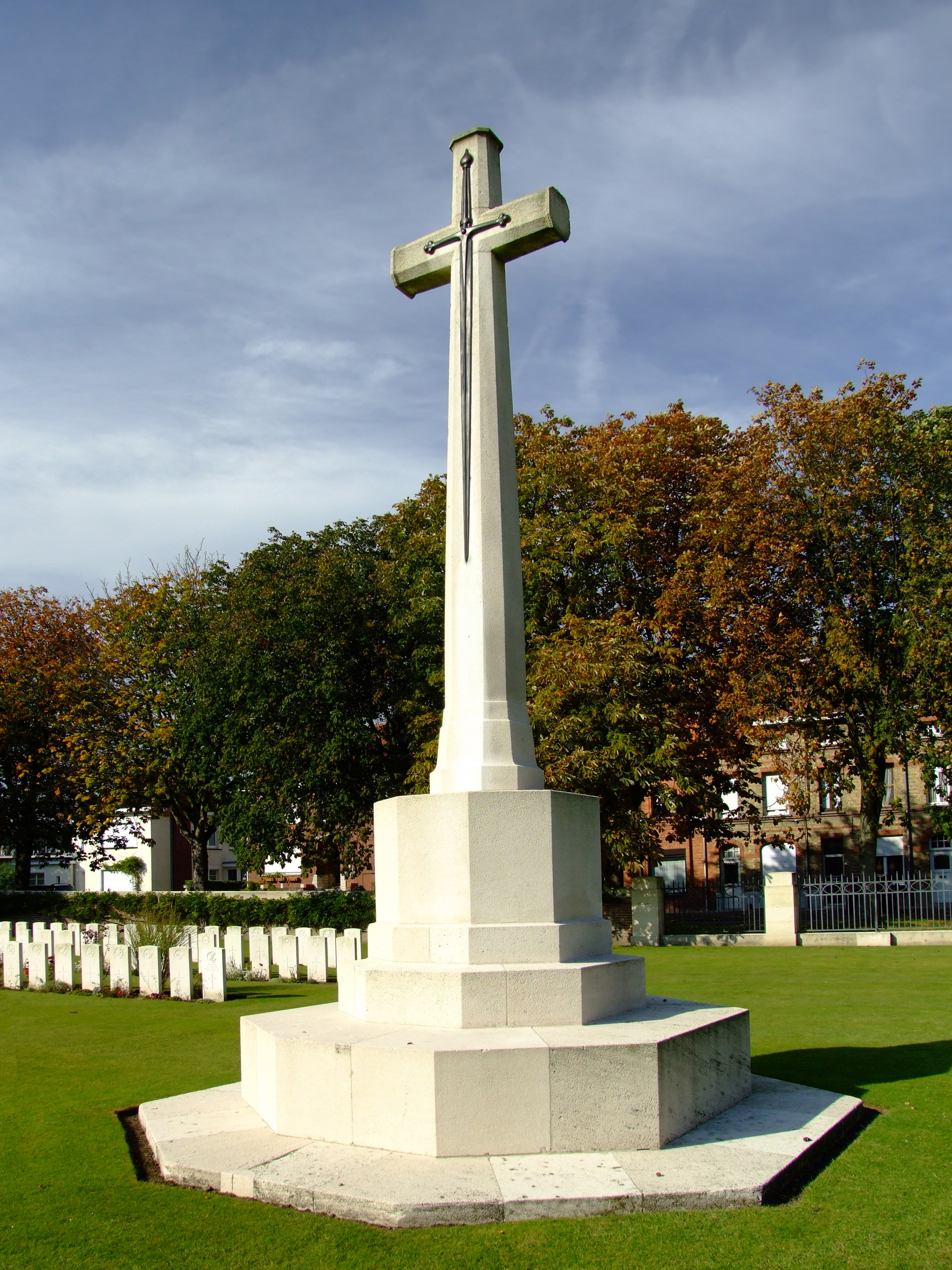
- Cross of Sacrifice in Ypres Reservoir Cemetery in Belgium
- For Commonwealth military personnel who died during the First World War
- Unveiled: 1920; 106 years ago

The Cross of Sacrifice is a Commonwealth war memorial designed in 1918 by Sir Reginald Blomfield for the Imperial War Graves Commission (now the Commonwealth War Graves Commission). It is present in Commonwealth war cemeteries containing 40 or more graves.

Its shape is an elongated Latin cross with proportions more typical of the Celtic cross, with the shaft and crossarm octagonal in section. It ranges in height from 18 to 24 feet (5.5 to 7.3 m). A bronze longsword, blade down, is affixed to the front of the cross (and sometimes to the back as well). It is usually mounted on an octagonal base. It may be freestanding or incorporated into other cemetery features. The Cross of Sacrifice is widely praised, widely imitated, and the archetypal British war memorial. It is the most imitated of Commonwealth war memorials, and duplicates and imitations have been used around the world.

== Development and design of the cross ==
=== The Imperial War Graves Commission ===
The First World War introduced killing on such a mass scale that few nations were prepared to cope with it. Millions of bodies were never recovered, or were recovered long after any identification could be made. Hundreds of thousands of bodies were buried on the battlefield where they lay. It was often impossible to dig trenches without unearthing remains, and artillery barrages often uncovered bodies and flung the disintegrating corpses into the air.

Many bodies were buried in French municipal cemeteries, but these rapidly filled to capacity. Due to the costs and sheer number of remains involved, Australia, Canada, India, Newfoundland, New Zealand, South Africa, and the United Kingdom barred repatriation of remains.

Fabian Ware, a director of the Rio Tinto mining company, toured some battlefields in as part of a British Red Cross mission in the fall of 1914. Ware was greatly disturbed by the state of British war graves, many of which were marked by deteriorating wooden crosses, haphazardly placed and with names and other identifying information written nearly illegibly in pencil. Ware petitioned the British government to establish an official agency to oversee the locating, recording, and marking of British war dead, and to acquire land for cemeteries. The Imperial War Office agreed, and created the Graves Registration Commission in March 1915. In May, the Graves Registration Commission ceased to operate an ambulance service for the British Red Cross, and in September was made an official arm of the military after being attached to the Army Service Corps.

During its short existence, the Graves Registration Commission consolidated many British war dead cemeteries. Ware negotiated a treaty with the French government whereby the French would purchase space for British war cemeteries, and the British government assumed the cost of platting, creating, and maintaining the sites. Over the next few months, the Graves Registration Commission closed British war dead cemeteries with fewer than 50 bodies, disinterred the bodies, and reinterred them at the new burying grounds. The Graves Registration Commission became the Directorate of Graves Registration and Enquiries in February 1916.

As the war continued, there was a growing awareness in the British Army that a more permanent body needed be organized to care for British war graves after the war. In January 1916, the prime minister H. H. Asquith appointed a National Committee for the Care of Soldiers' Graves to take over this task. Edward, Prince of Wales agreed to serve as the committee's president. The committee's membership reflected all members of the British Commonwealth (with a special representative from India).

Over the next year, members of the National Committee for the Care of Soldiers' Graves began to feel that their organization was inadequate to the task, and that a more formal organization, with a broader mandate, should be created. The idea was broached at the first Imperial War Conference in March 1917, and on 21 May 1917 the Imperial War Graves Commission (IWGC) was chartered. Lord Derby was named its chair, and the Prince of Wales its president.

=== Development of the war cemetery ideal ===
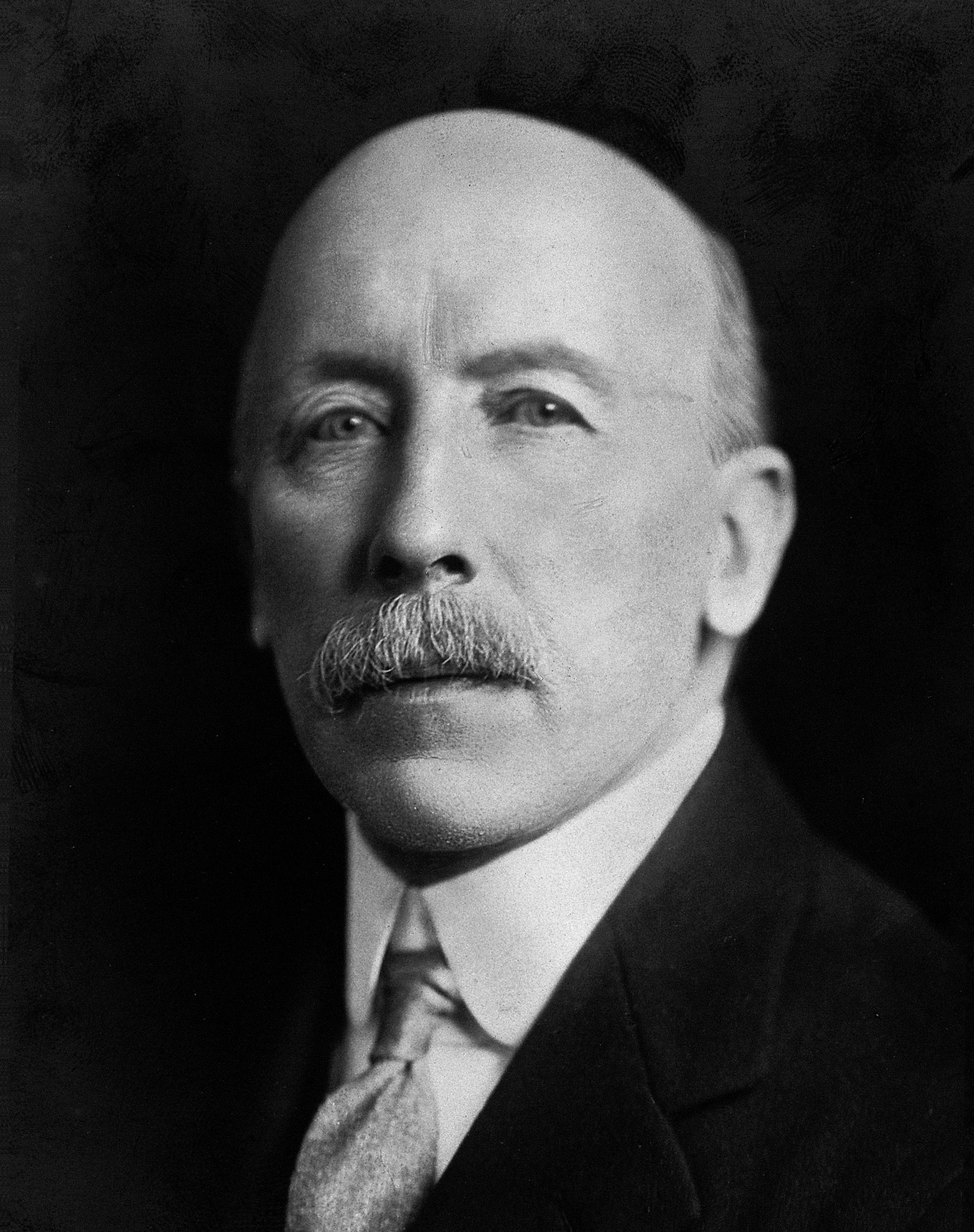
Sir Frederic Kenyon

Prior to the First World War, the British (as well as continental European) tradition was to bury officers who died on the battlefield in individual graves and common soldiers in mass graves. The Great War changed this sentiment, as it was a total war, one in which nations engaged in the complete mobilization of all available resources, modes of production, and population in order to fight. Subsequently, as the war continued, there was a growing expectation among the people of the United Kingdom that foot soldiers as well as officers should not only be buried singly but commemorated. Many British families had already tried to visit the graves of loved ones, and could not locate them. Numerous letters appeared in newspapers decrying the problem, and Ware realized the British war effort was heading towards a public relations disaster. Ware, too, felt that the experience of war in the trenches was reducing socio-economic and class barriers. He firmly believed that British policy should be to treat all war dead alike, regardless of class or ability to pay. Wealthy families should not be able to repatriate their dead, inter remains privately in France, nor erect ornate memorials over their loved ones.

In July 1917, after consulting with architectural and artistic experts in London, Ware invited the architects Edwin Lutyens and Herbert Baker; Charles Aitken, director of the Tate Gallery; and the author Sir James Barrie to tour British battlefield cemeteries near the front in an attempt to formulate broad ideas for the post-war design of these burying grounds. (Note: Lutyens was particularly interested in the design of British war cemeteries. On 27 May 1917, a week after the founding of the Imperial War Grave Commission, he wrote a letter to Ware outlining his idea for a simple war memorial to be placed in each cemetery, a precursor to the Stone of Remembrance the IWGC would adopt in 1918. Lutyens wrote to Barrie the following month, outling his idea, which Barrie endorsed.) The trip began on 9 July. The group met formally on 14 July after the trip ended. Ware, Lutyens, and Baker agreed that every cemetery ought to obey a general theme (although the theme was not yet established), that there should only be four variations on the theme (monumental, garden or woodland, village, and town cemeteries), that grave markers should be uniform headstones (not crosses), and that cemetery walls should be horizontal. Aitken insisted on cemeteries of simple design and low cost, feeling public money should be spent on practical items like schools and hospitals. Baker wanted a cross at each cemetery, but Lutyens wanted a more abstract symbol. Aitken supported Baker in thinking that a cross was more appropriate in the French countryside. (Note: The idea of using headstones rather than crosses was firmly adopted by Lutyens as a design principle in August 1917 after a visit with his longtime collaborator, the garden designer Gertrude Jekyll. The IWGC announced in January 1918 that the erection of private memorials in British war cemeteries would be barred.) At one point, Baker suggested a cross with a pentagonal shaft (one side for each self-governing dominion), and for Indian cemeteries a column topped by appropriate symbol (such as the dharmacakra or Star of India). (Note: Lutyens mistakenly believed that Baker had proposed a five-pointed cross, each point representing one of the British dominions. Lutyens, mocking Baker in a letter to Lutyens's wife, pointed out that there were six dominions, which seems to have escaped Baker's notice.)

Ware, Lutyens, and Baker met for a second time to discuss cemetery planning at the IWGC headquarters in London on 21 September 1917. They were joined by Arthur William Hill, then the assistant director of Kew Gardens. (Note: At Ware's urging, Hill visited British war dead cemeteries in France in early 1916 to get ideas for landscape and planting designs. He later provided planting designs for more than 150 cemeteries.) Both Baker and Lutyens presented draft designs for various types of cemeteries, but no agreement was reached on any design principles. After Ware informed him about the lack of unanimity among his advisors, the Prince of Wales advised Ware to keep news of any disagreements out of public view.

Frustrated by the lack of agreement among and hardening positions adopted by Lutyens, Baker, and Aitken, Ware turned to Sir Frederic G. Kenyon, director of the British Museum and a highly respected ancient languages scholar. Kenyon not only had expertise in art and architecture, but he was imperturbable, systematic in his work methods, businesslike, and practical. He was also a lieutenant colonel in the British Army and had served in France, and he and Ware agreed to emphasize his military rank as a way of keeping disputes in check. Kenyon's appointment was one of the first actions taken by the IWGC at its inaugural meeting on 20 November 1917. Aitken was released that same month. Ware asked Kenyon to help break the deadlock as quickly as possible. Over the next two months, Kenyon twice visited battlefield cemeteries in France and Belgium and consulted with a wide range of religious groups and artists. Kenyon agreed that Commonwealth military cemeteries should be uniform in order to emphasize their military character and the role the collective has over the individual in the armed forces but he went a step further, arguing that the cemeteries should also be maintained in perpetuity by the British government, something never before attempted for large numbers of military graves. With Lutyens arguing for a "value free" and pantheistic Stone of Remembrance and Baker pushing for an elaborate and almost Neoclassical approach, Kenyon advocated a compromise solution. His rationale was that some of the decisions made about the cemeteries would prove to be highly controversial, and something had to be done to win over public opinion. To do so, Kenyon pushed for a cross to be added to each site. Although costly (particularly in the smaller cemeteries), Kenyon argued that most families were Christian and expected a cross, most families saw the cross as a sign of the sacrifice their loved ones made in death, and the addition of the cross would mollify the politically influential Church of England. (Note: Another compromise made to win over the public was to allow regimental symbols and short amounts of text to be added to each headstone to allow the individualization the public wanted. Kenyon also successfully pushed for the extensive planting of trees and shrubs to form public spaces (rather than the construction of buildings or walls), the removal of curbs to mark individual graves, the removal of large panels containing the names of the dead from the public shelter (a printed book would be used instead), lower height for the wall surrounding the cemetery, and for space to be created for the erection of communal memorials commemorating battles, military units, or the missing. He unsuccessfully advocated that the War Stone be placed in the public shelter.)

Lutyens argued for an obelisk rather than a cross. When he lost that argument, he argued that the cross should have a shortened cross-arm and a lengthened shaft, in order to emphasize its verticality amidst the trees of the French countryside. That argument was also unpersuasive.

Kenyon's report, War Graves: How the Cemeteries Abroad will be Designed, was submitted to Ware in February 1918. The IWGC accepted them at its meeting on 18 February. With Baker and Lutyens, although good friends, at odds about how to design the cemeteries despite agreement on general themes, Kenyon recommended that only young architects, who served in the war, be hired as cemetery designers. A team of senior architects—which would include Lutyens, Baker, and one other—would oversee the designs. With minor additions, Kenyon's report was published in November 1918.

=== Appointment of Blomfield ===
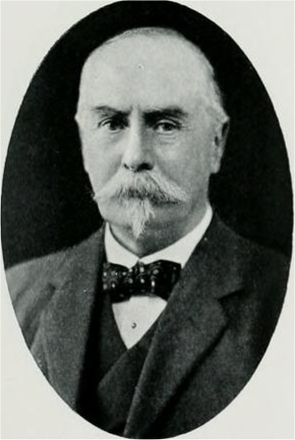
Sir Reginald Blomfield in 1921.

After receiving the Kenyon report in February 1918, the following month Ware appointed Reginald Blomfield to be one of the senior architects overseeing the design of British war cemeteries. Blomfield was chosen on the recommendation of Kenyon. Blomfield was an expert in both British and French architecture, and had written extensively on garden planning. Blomfield was greatly experienced in serving on committees, commissions, and government advisory bodies, and Ware hoped that Blomfield would use his age, experience, and dominance in the field of architecture to help rein in Baker and Lutyens. Ware also hoped that Blomfield's amiable nature and firm hand would keep the disagreements between Baker and Lutyens from getting out of hand. Furthermore, Blomfield was a widely acknowledged expert in generating highly accurate cost estimates and in crafting excellent contracts. Blomfield was paid £400 per year in 1918, which was raised to £600 per year in 1919.

The same month he was appointed to the senior architects' committee, Blomfield accompanied Lutyens and Baker on a tour of French and Belgian battlefields.

=== Designing the Cross of Sacrifice ===
Kenyon, Baker, and Blomfield all submitted cross designs to the senior architects' committee. Kenyon submitted two draft designs, one for a Celtic cross and one for a medieval Christian cross (both typically found in old English cemeteries). Baker, who had advocated the cemetery theme of "crusade" since July 1917, and according to Goebel was "obsessed" with the idea, submitted the design of a stone Christian cross (Note: Architecturally, the proportions of the Christian cross are about equal to the proportion of the human body, with the height proportional to the crossarm at a ratio of 1:.85. The cross-arm is placed about 30 percent of the distance from the top.) with a bronze longsword (called a Crusader's sword by Baker) on the front. His design, which he called the "Ypres cross", also included a bronze image of a naval sailing ship, emblematic of the Royal Navy's role in winning both the Crusades and the First World War.

Blomfield, on the other hand, took a different approach to the cross. He rejected Kenyon's design, arguing that "runic monuments or gothic crosses had nothing to do with the grim terrors of the trenches." Blomfield wanted a design that reflected the war, which had stripped away any notions about glory in combat and nobility in death on the battlefield. "What I wanted to do in designing this Cross was to make it as abstract and impersonal as I could, to free it from any association of any particular style, and, above all, to keep clear of any sentimentalism of the Gothic. This was a man's war far too terrible for any fripperies, and I hoped to get within range of the infinite in this symbol..." His design featured an elongated cross of abstract design, on the front of which was a bronze longsword, blade pointed downward. It was intended to be an overtly Christian symbol, in contrast to Lutyen's Stone of Remembrance (which was purposely stripped of any such associations). Blomfield drew the inspiration for the sword from a sword which hung in his home in Rye.

The senior architects' committee quickly endorsed the Blomfield design. The committee considered adding text to the base or steps of the cross, but rejected this idea. (Note: Lutyens also designed a cross as a war memorial, but did not submit it to the IWGC senior architects' committee. Lutyens's cross is usually placed on a three-stepped square base about 5 feet (1.5 m) high. The shaft and crossarm are both octagonal, tapering significantly toward the top. The crossarm is severely truncated in nearly all these crosses, barely extending from the shaft. Lutyens's biographer, Christopher Hussey, asserts that the Lutyens war cross was also adopted by the senior architects' committee and used in IWGC cemeteries. But architectural historians Tim Skelton and Gerald Gliddon point out that Lutyens's design was not made until at least spring of 1919, when it was erected in the villages of King's Somborne and Stockbridge in Hampshire. The Lutyens cross, they also observe, was never used in any IWGC cemetery. The earliest uses of the Lutyens cross were at the Common at Abinger, Surrey, and outside Ravenglass, Cumbria—both erected in 1920.)

In order to ensure that the architects' ideas for Commonwealth cemeteries worked well in the field, the IWGC decided to fund the construction of three experimental cemeteries Le Tréport, Forceville, and Louvencourt. The goal was to determine how expensive the cemeteries were likely to be. The model cemeteries were designed by Baker, Lutyens, and Blomfield, and began construction in May 1918. (Note: Burials of new remains and the consolidation of smaller cemeteries were continuing throughout this period. Although graves had been laid out somewhat haphazardly prior to the construction of the experimental cemeteries, afterward burials were made according to plans drawn up by the IWGC. The experimental cemeteries were constructed around the somewhat more haphazardly laid out graves.) Due to problems with construction, none were complete until early 1920, six months later than planned. Each model cemetery had a chapel and shelter, but no Stone of Remembrance or Cross of Sacrifice. Nevertheless, even without these major additions, the cemeteries were too expensive.

The model cemeteries experiment changed the way the Stone of Remembrance was placed in cemeteries, and almost changed the design of the Cross of Sacrifice itself. To reduce costs, Blomfield offered to design a wide variety of crosses, many of which were less costly than the original design, but the committee of senior architects rejected his offer. What became apparent with the experimental cemeteries was that a full-size cross or stone was appropriate only for the largest cemeteries. Mid-size and smaller cemeteries needed smaller memorials. Blomfield quickly designed two smaller-sized crosses to accommodate this need, (Note: Initially, there were three sizes, ranging from 18 feet (5.5 m) to 32 feet (9.8 m).) but Lutyens refused to allow anything but a full-sized War Stone (12 feet (3.7 m) in length and 5 feet (1.5 m) in height) to be used. Subsequently, and partly as a cost-saving measure, no Stone of Remembrance was erected in a cemetery with fewer than 400 graves. Budgetary issues also led the committee to agree that shelters should be forgone in any cemetery with fewer than 200 graves.

The model cemeteries experiment also helped the architects decide where to place the Cross of Sacrifice. As early as 1917, Lutyens and Kenyon had agreed that the War Stone should be in the east, but facing west. (All graves were supposed to face east, facing the enemy, although many of the earliest cemeteries had graves facing in other [sometimes in many different] directions.) The initial idea was to have the Cross of Sacrifice be in opposition to the War Stone. In practice, however, the placement of the Cross of Sacrifice varied widely.

The model cemeteries experiment also had one other effect, and that was to make Blomfield's design for the cross the only one ever used by the IWGC. The original intent of the senior architects had been to allow each junior architect to design his own cross for his own cemetery but Blomfield's design proved so wildly popular that the decision was made to implement it as a standard feature in all cemeteries.

The formal adoption of Blomfield's Cross of Sacrifice, and the concepts regarding its placement, position, and use, were outlined by Kenyon in a report, A Memorandum on the Cross as Central Monument, submitted in January 1919 as an addendum to his November 1918 main report.

== About the Cross of Sacrifice ==
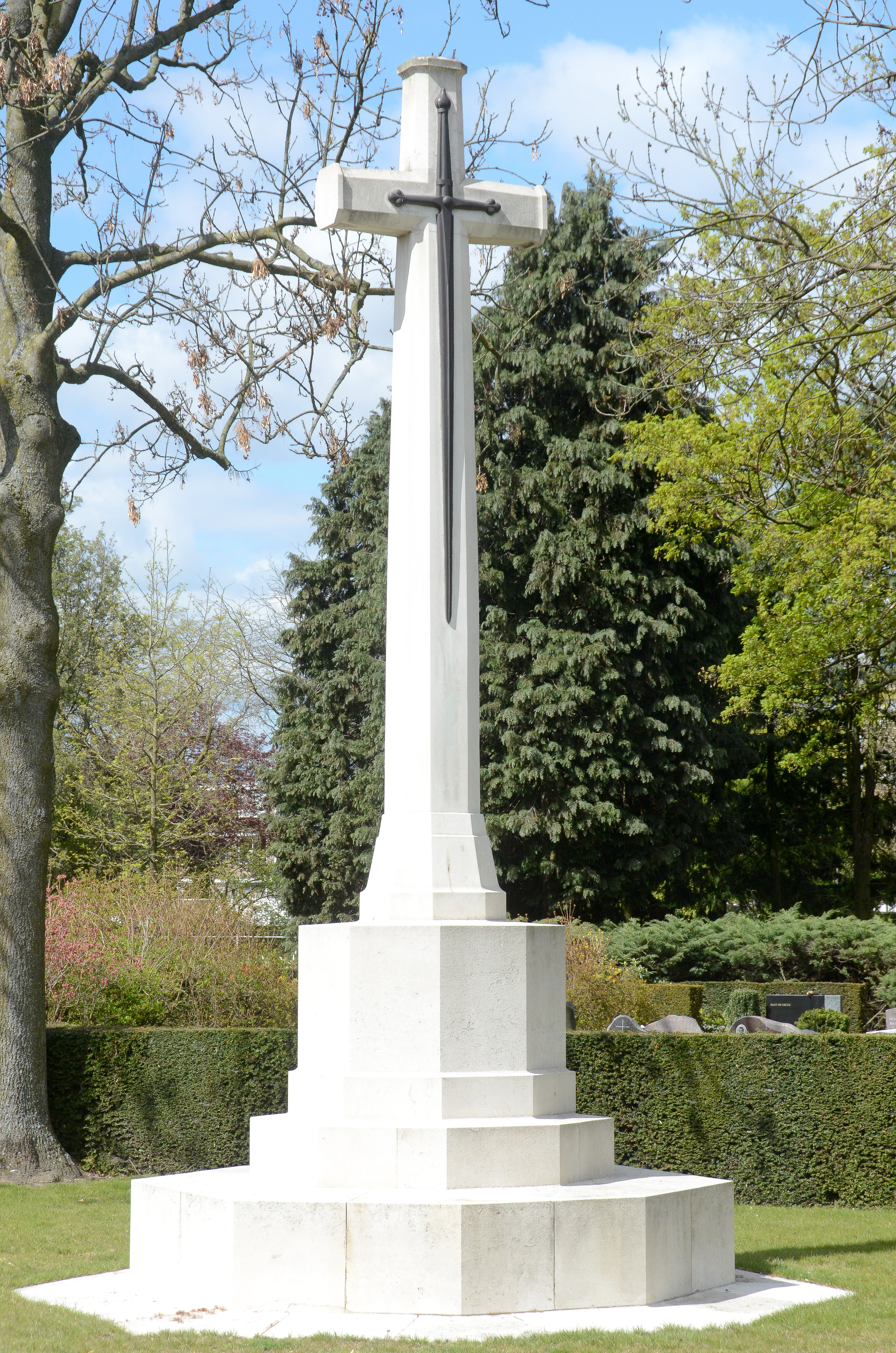
Cross of Sacrifice at Eindhoven, Netherlands.

According to Fabian Ware, the name "Cross of Sacrifice" arose spontaneously from an unknown source, and attached itself to the cross.

The Cross of Sacrifice is carved from white stone. This is usually Portland stone, but it is sometimes granite or any type of white limestone commonly found in France or Belgium. In Italy, Chiampo Perla limestone was used. The proportions of the cross, with short arms close to the top of the shaft are similar to some Celtic crosses, the crossarm being one-third the length of the shaft (as measured from the point where the shaft emerges from the base). The cross consists of three pieces: The shaft, from base to crossarm; the crossarm; and the upper shaft, above the crossarm. The crossarm is fastened to the lower and upper shaft by two bronze dowels. A joggle (a portion of the shaft which extends into the base, acting as a joint) about 6 inches (15 cm) long extends into the base, where it is secured by another bronze dowel. The shaft and crossarm are both octagonal in shape, and the shaft tapers slightly as it rises to give the cross entasis. On the large version, there are three plain mouldings on the shaft near the base, often reduced to one in smaller sizes, and the three extremities of the cross finish at a plain moulding projecting sideways from the main element. The crossarms are sometimes irregular octagons in section, with four wide faces at front, back, top and bottom, and four shorter faces in between them.

A stylized bronze longsword, point down, is fastened to the front of the cross. The cross is designed so that a second bronze sword may be fastened to the rear as well. The sword is positioned so that the crossguard on the sword matches where the cross's shaft and crossarm meet.

The Cross of Sacrifice originally came in four heights: 14 feet (4.3 m), 18 feet (5.5 m), 20 feet (6.1 m), and 24 feet (7.3 m). Sizes up to 30 feet (9.1 m) are now permitted; exceptionally so too larger versions. As of 2012, the largest stands as the 40-foot (12 m) instance at the Halifax Memorial in Halifax, Nova Scotia, Canada.

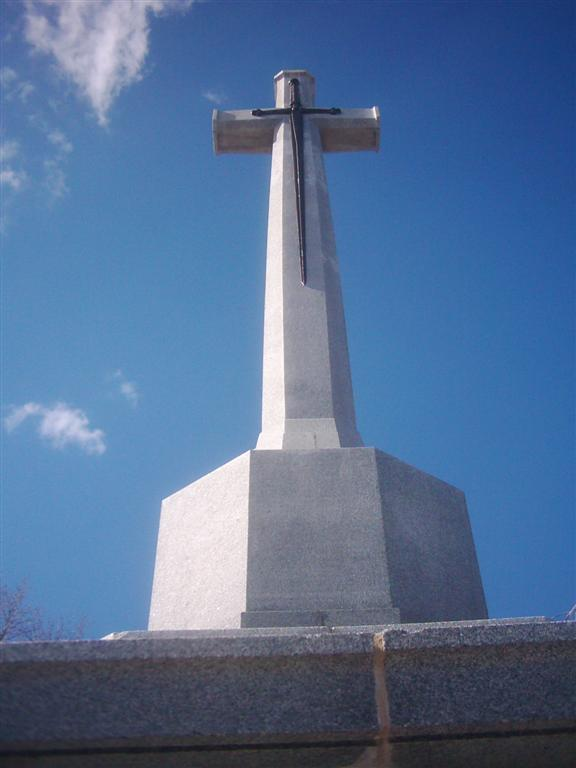
The Halifax Memorial's Cross of Sacrifice

The shaft is fastened to an octagonal base. The size of the base varies, according to the height of the shaft, but the 24-foot (7.3 m) high cross has a base 15 feet 6 inches (4.72 m) in diameter. This largest base weighs 2 short tons (1.8 t). The base usually sits on three octagonal steps. This can vary, however, depending on the height of the cross, its placement in the cemetery, and whether it is part of some other cemetery element.

The position of the Cross of Sacrifice in Commonwealth war cemeteries varies depending on a wide range of factors. Many cemeteries were laid out haphazardly during the war. The role of the junior designing architect was to determine the position of the Cross (and Stone of Remembrance) in relationship to the graves. Most cemeteries had two axes—a main axis and an entrance axis, or a main/entrance axis and a lateral axis. An overriding guiding principle was that the War Stone should be the focus of the cemetery. The Cross of Sacrifice, however, usually functioned as the primary orienting feature of the cemetery for visitors, due to its height. In hilly areas, the architect had to ensure that the cross was visible from the road or path. (This was far less important in flat areas.) When a road passed directly by the cemetery, the cross usually was placed near the road and the entrance to the cemetery associated with the cross. These design considerations meant that the Cross of Sacrifice could be placed in a wide variety of places. Sometimes it was situated next to the War Stone, and sometimes in opposition to it. In some cases, the Cross of Sacrifice was placed in a distant corner of the cemetery, so that its relationship to the Stone of Remembrance was not clear.

It was not necessary for the Cross of Sacrifice to stand alone, either. In some cases, it was incorporated into a wall or benches. (Note: At Tyne Cot Commonwealth War Graves Cemetery in Belgium, King George V himself suggested, during a visit to the then–under-construction cemetery in 1922, that the Cross of Sacrifice be built atop an Imperial German Army blockhouse.) The placement of the Cross of Sacrifice affected other elements of the cemetery. The architect's choice of buildings to erect—double shelters, galleries, gateways, pergolas, sheltered alcoves, or single shelters—depended on the location of the War Stone, the Cross of Sacrifice, and the size of the cemetery.

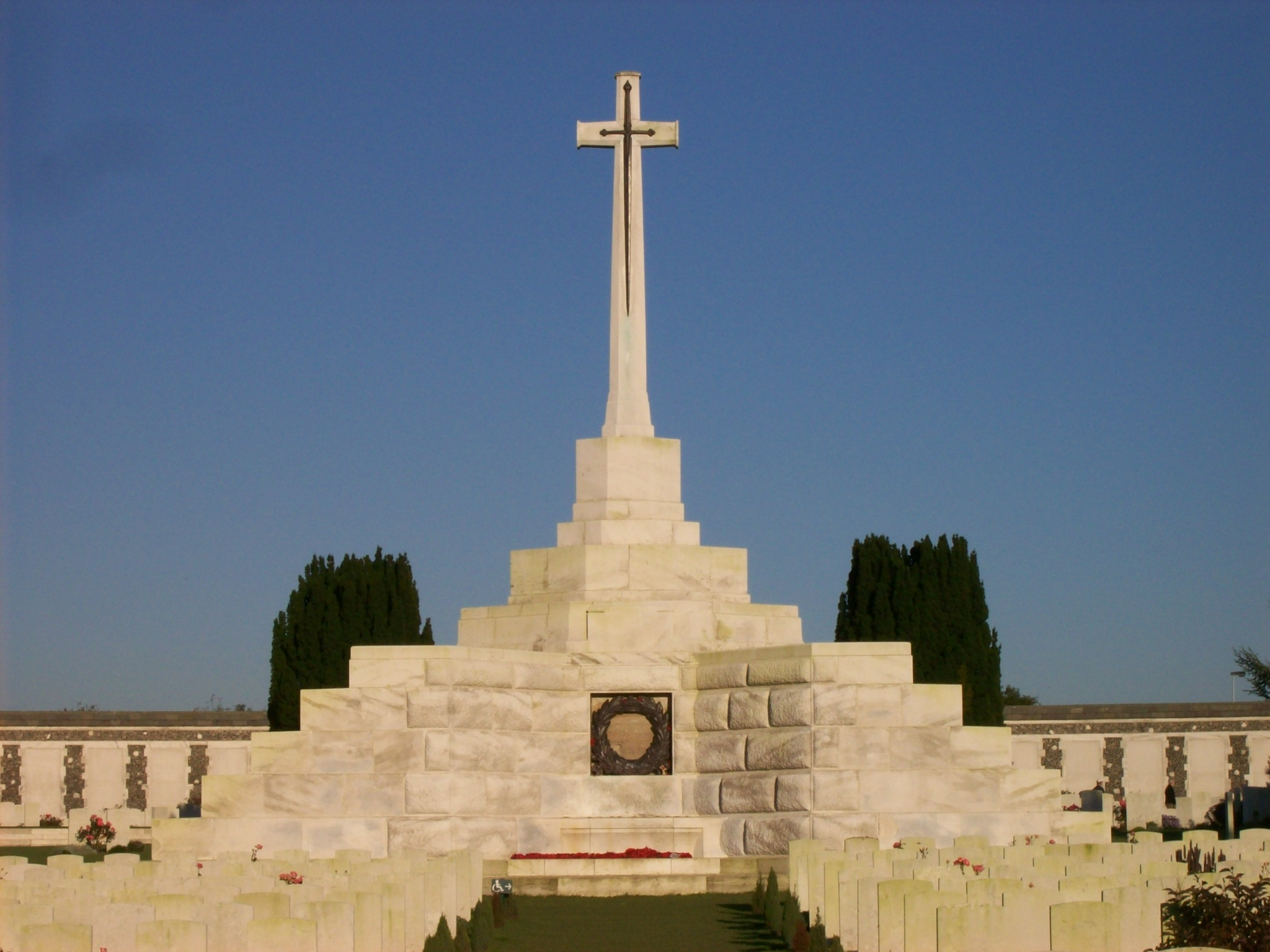
The cross at Tyne Cot Cemetery near Ypres, Belgium, was incorporated into a pillbox.

A Cross of Sacrifice was erected in almost every Commonwealth war cemetery. Subsequent Commonwealth War Graves Commission policy has erected the cross in Commonwealth war cemeteries with 40 or more graves. There were only a handful of exceptions. No cross was erected in cemeteries which held a majority of Chinese or Indian graves. In Turkey, no cross was erected in order to accommodate local Muslim feelings. Instead, a simple Latin cross was carved into a stone slab, which was placed at the rear of the cemetery. In Macedonia, a cairn was used in place of a cross to reflect the local custom. (Note: Longworth asserts that Muslim–Christian enmity was so strong, the IWGC feared that the Cross of Sacrifice would be desecrated, so the cairn was used instead.) In the several Commonwealth cemeteries in the mountains of Italy, Blomfield's design was replaced with a Latin cross made of rough square blocks of red or white stone. (Note: Difficulty of transportation prevented the Cross of Sacrifice from being used in these locations.)

It is unclear how much it cost to manufacture a Cross of Sacrifice. Generally speaking, however, the cost of building a cemetery was borne by each Commonwealth nation in proportion to number of their war dead in that cemetery.

While generally considered a beautiful design, the Cross of Sacrifice is not a robust one. The artwork is susceptible to toppling in high wind, as the shaft is held upright only by a 6-inch (15 cm) long piece of stone and a single bronze dowel. Should the stone joggle or dowel break, the shaft topples. This problem quickly became apparent in Europe, where a large number of the crosses fell in high winds in the 1920s and 1930s. At one point, the Imperial War Graves Commission considered suing Blomfield for under-designing the artwork, but no lawsuit was ever filed.

Vandalism has also been a problem. Crosses of Sacrifice have been smashed or the bronze swords stolen, with the vandalism being particularly bad in the 1970s.

== Assessment ==
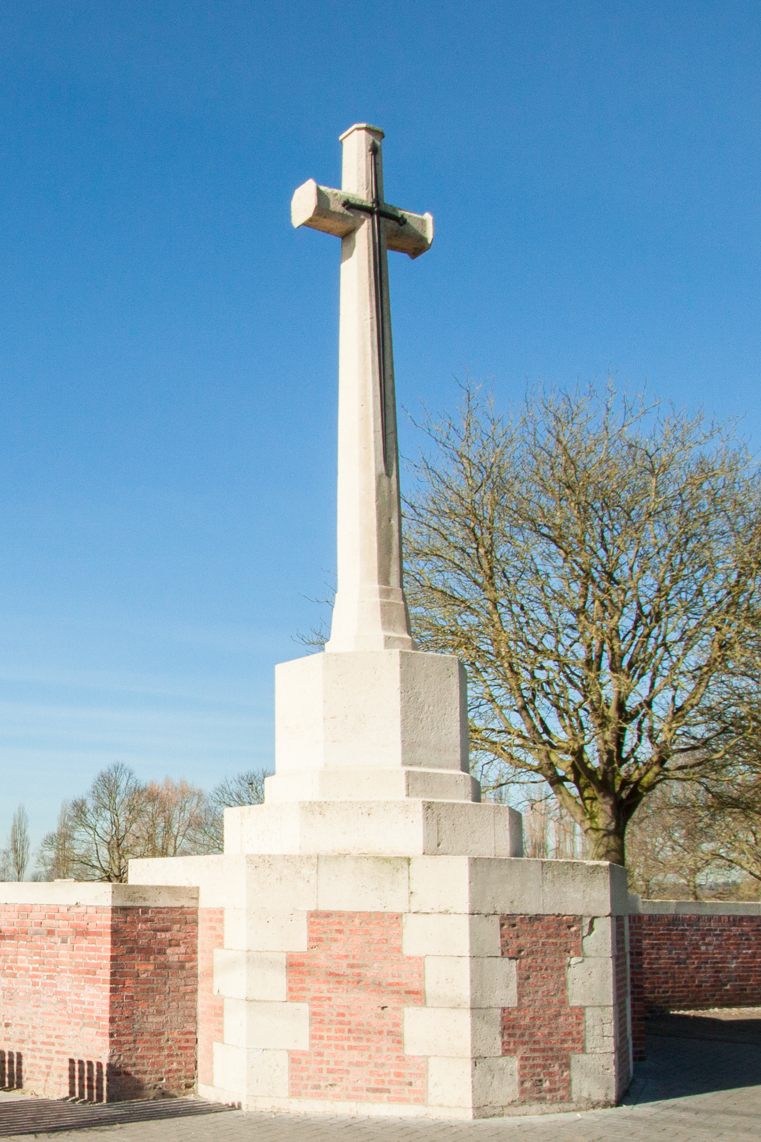
Cross of Sacrifice incorporated into a wall at Lijssenthoek Military Cemetery in Belgium

The Cross of Sacrifice is considered one of the great pieces of war-related art. Its enduring popularity, historian Allen Frantzen says, is because it is both simple and expressive, its abstraction reflecting the modernity people valued after the war. Fabian Ware argued that its greatness was because its symbolism is so purposefully vague: To some, it is a Christian cross; to others, the stone is irrelevant and the sword itself is the cross; and to others, the artwork symbolizes those who sacrificed their lives to the sword. The theme of sacrifice is commonly seen in the piece. Jeroen Geurst points out that Lutyens's War Stone unsettlingly brings to mind images of soldiers sacrificed on the altar of war, while Blomfield's cross speaks about self-sacrifice and the saving grace of Jesus Christ's sacrifice.

The sword has drawn praise as well. Frantzen notes that the inverted sword is a common chivalrous emblem which can be seen as both an offensive and a defensive weapon, symbolizing might wielded in defence of the values of the cross; it here embodies "the ideals of simplicity and expressive functionalism". Historian Mark Sheftall agrees that the sword evokes chivalric themes, and argues that by combining the religious and the chivalric with the classical Blomfield created "a single powerful image". But the military element has also been criticized. Geurst argues that one may interpret the sword as implying that the Great War was a religious crusade—which it most certainly was not.

The impact of the Cross of Sacrifice on war memorialization is difficult to overestimate. The IWGC considered the artwork a "mark of the symbolism of the present crusade". Cemetery historian Ken Worpole argues that the Cross of Sacrifice "became one of the most resonant and distinctive artefacts in British and Commonwealth war cemeteries, following the end of World War One." First World War historian Bruce Scates observes that its symbolism was effective throughout the Commonwealth, despite widely disparate cultural and religious norms. Historians agree it is the most widely imitated of Commonwealth war memorials, and Sheftall concludes that it has become the archetypal example of Great War commemoration in Britain.

Artistically, the Cross of Sacrifice has been called "[t]raditional but austere, even stark". Rudyard Kipling, literary advisor to the IWGC, described it as a "stark sword brooding on the bosom of the Cross". This wording appeared in Kipling's poem "The King's Pilgrimage".

== Notable installations ==
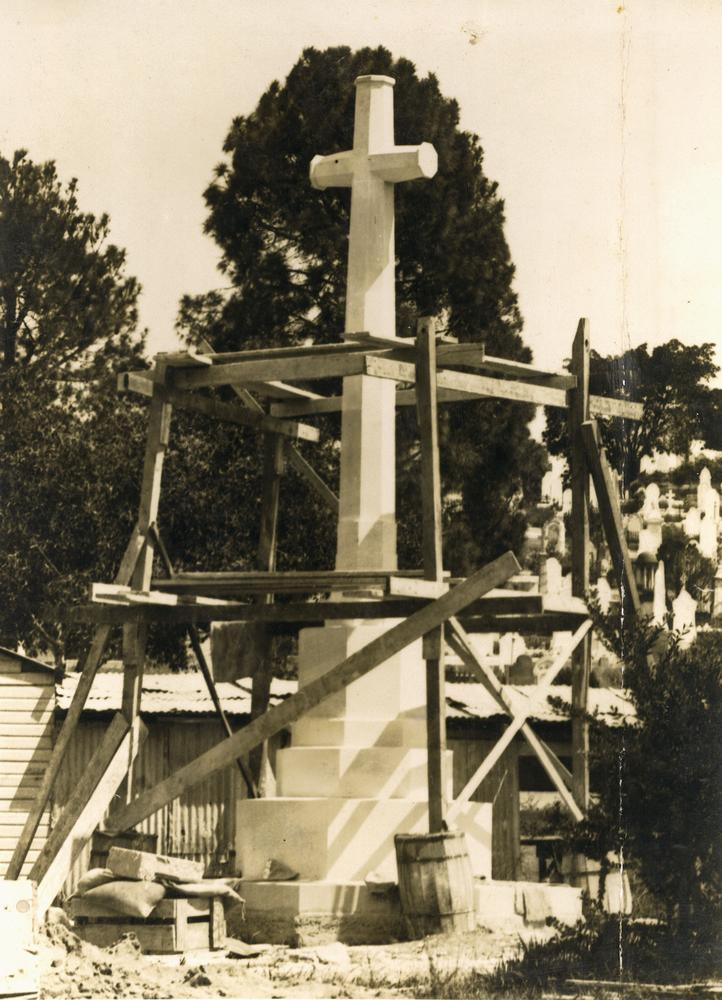
Cross of Sacrifice under construction at the Toowong Cemetery, Brisbane, Australia, in 1924

By 1937, more than 1,000 of Blomfield's crosses had been erected in France and Belgium. During and after the Second World War, more than 12,000 new war grave sites were created in the United Kingdom. Of these, however, only 416 received a Cross of Sacrifice. Two crosses were erected at Brookwood Military Cemetery in London, due to its unique layout. The first Cross of Sacrifice to be erected after the Second World War was in the cemetery at Great Bircham, Norfolk, in the United Kingdom by George VI in July 1946. The first post-WWII cross erected over a war graves cemetery was at Chouain in the summer of 1948.

=== United Kingdom ===
One of the first examples to be erected was in St Mary's churchyard in Blomfield's home town of Rye, East Sussex. The construction of the cross is understood to have been supervised by Blomfield himself free of charge and it was unveiled on 19 October 1919.

Duplicates of the Cross of Sacrifice were erected in many places in the United Kingdom, including: Glanadda Cemetery, Bangor, North Wales; Cathays Cemetery, Cardiff, Wales; Peel Green Cemetery, Salford, Greater Manchester; Leigh Cemetery, Wigan, Greater Manchester; Hale Cemetery, Altrincham Greater Manchester; St Lawrence Cemetery, Stratford-sub-Castle, Wiltshire; Eastwood New Cemetery, East Renfrewshire; Rutherglen Cemetery, South Lanarkshire; Cardonald Cemetery, Glasgow; Cathcart Cemetery, Glasgow; Craigton Cemetery, Glasgow; Eastern Necropolis, Glasgow; Western Necropolis, Glasgow; Sandymount Cemetery, Glasgow; Rosebank Cemetery, Edinburgh, Scotland; Cannock Chase Cemetery, Huntingdon, Cambridgeshire; Milltown Cemetery, Belfast, Northern Ireland; and Lerwick Cemetery, Shetland.

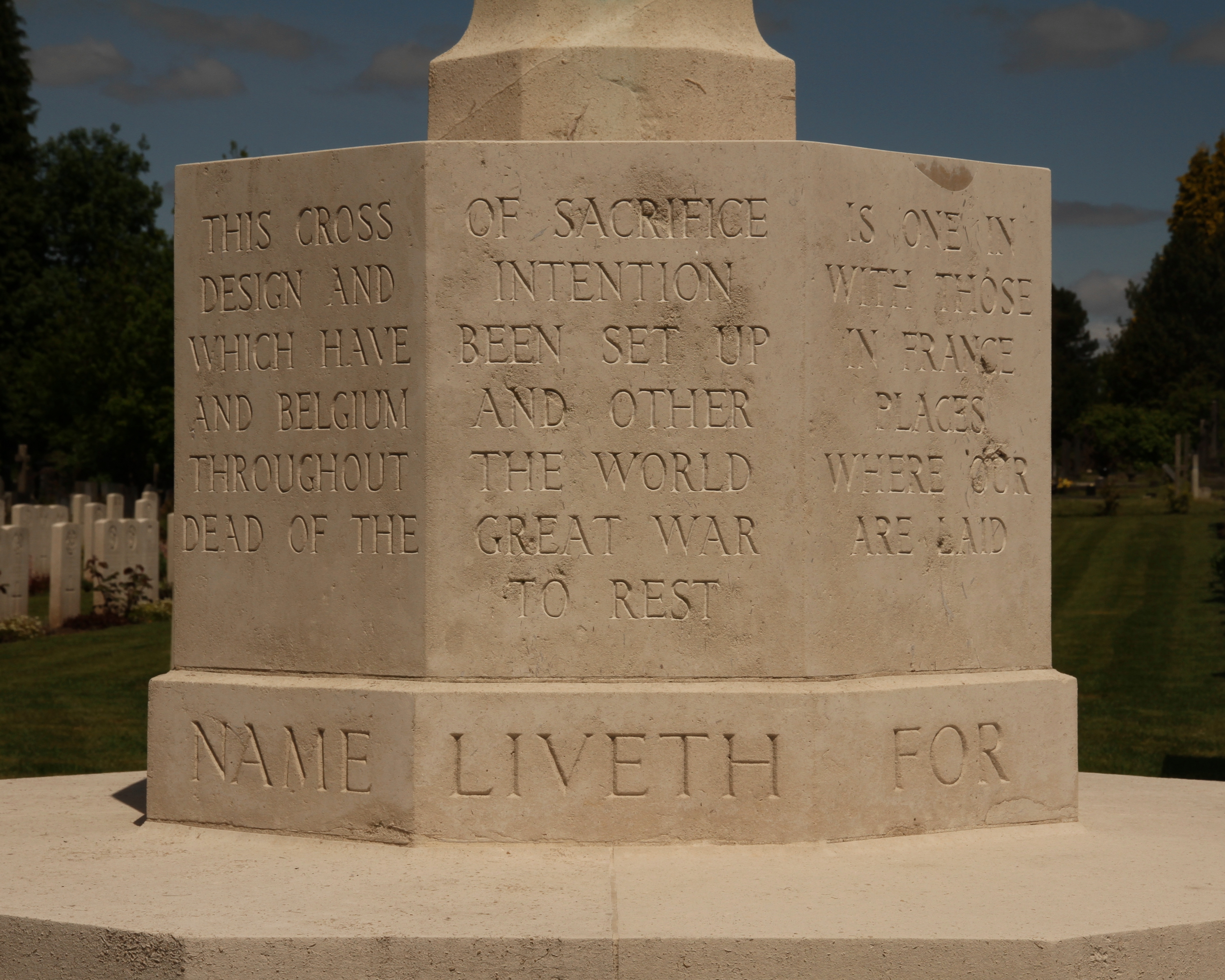
Inscription at the foot of the Cross of Sacrifice in Cathays Cemetery, Cardiff

Some of the memorials are Grade II listed, such as the cross at St. Johns Cemetery, Margate, Kent. Most of the memorials have the following inscription on the base:

THIS CROSS OF SACRIFICE IS ONE IN

DESIGN AND INTENTION WITH THOSE
WHICH HAVE BEEN SET UP IN FRANCE
AND BELGIUM AND OTHER PLACES
THROUGHOUT THE WORLD WHERE OUR
DEAD OF THE GREAT WAR ARE LAID
TO REST

THEIR NAME LIVETH FOR EVERMORE

=== United States ===
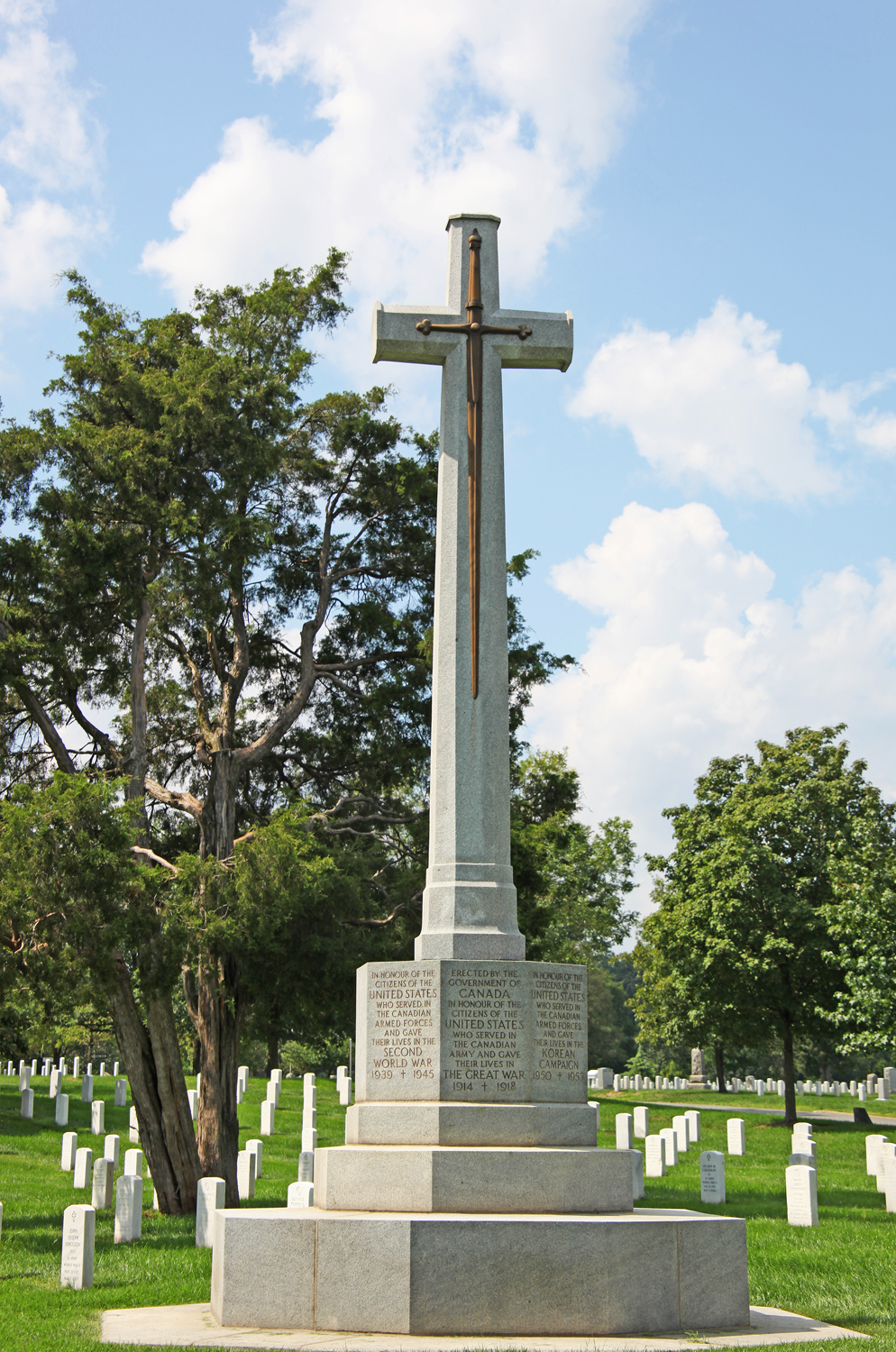
Canadian Cross of Sacrifice at Arlington National Cemetery.

There is a Cross of Sacrifice at Arlington National Cemetery, Arlington County, Virginia. It was proposed in 1925 by Canadian Prime Minister William Lyon Mackenzie King to honour the Americans who joined the Canadian armed forces fighting in Europe. On 12 June 1925, President Calvin Coolidge approved the request, and the monument dedicated on Armistice Day 1927. Attending the ceremony was a guard of honour of more than 200 Canadian soldiers, comprising contingents from The Royal Canadian Regiment, the Royal 22nd Regiment, the pipe band of the 48th Highlanders of Canada and trumpeters from the Royal Canadian Horse Artillery and The Royal Canadian Dragoons. The United States Army was represented by a guard from the 12th Infantry Regiment and buglers from the 3rd Cavalry Regiment. President Coolidge was in attendance and an address was given by Dwight F. Davis, the Secretary of War.

The inscription on the 24-foot (7.3 m) high grey granite cross is to "Citizens of the United States who served in the Canadian Army and gave their lives in the Great War". After the Second World War and the Korean War, similar inscriptions on other faces of the monument were dedicated to the Americans who served in those conflicts.

A Cross of Sacrifice stands in Oakwood Cemetery in Montgomery, Alabama and is the largest Commonwealth War Grave site in the United States. 78 members of the RAF are buried here, the majority having died from training accidents during World War II. In early 1941, the United States Army Air Forces agreed to train British and Commonwealth pilots at the Southeast Air Corps Training Center headquartered at Maxwell Air Force Base.

=== Elsewhere ===
A Cross of Sacrifice has been erected in a number of cemeteries and other places which are not Commonwealth war cemeteries. Some of the more notable examples include:

- Adelaide, Australia – A Cross of Sacrifice was erected in the Cross of Sacrifice Memorial Gardens. It is dedicated "to the men who gave their lives in the Great War 1914–1920", and is a tribute from the women of South Australia. The gardens form part of the Peace Park which also incorporates the Prince Henry Gardens, Ester Lipman Gardens, and the Pioneer Women's Memorial Gardens.
- Dublin, Ireland – A Cross of Sacrifice was unveiled in Glasnevin Cemetery in Dublin on 31 July 2014 to commemorate the thousands of Irish soldiers who died in the First and Second World Wars. The unveiling of the artwork, the first Cross of Sacrifice erected on Irish soil, was witnessed by President of Ireland Michael D. Higgins and Prince Edward, Duke of Kent. The project was a joint effort by the Glasnevin Trust and the Commonwealth War Graves Commission.
- Gibraltar – The Gibraltar Cross of Sacrifice was erected in 1922. It was the focus of the territory's Remembrance Sunday ceremonies until 2009, when the event was moved to the Gibraltar War Memorial.

== Gallery ==
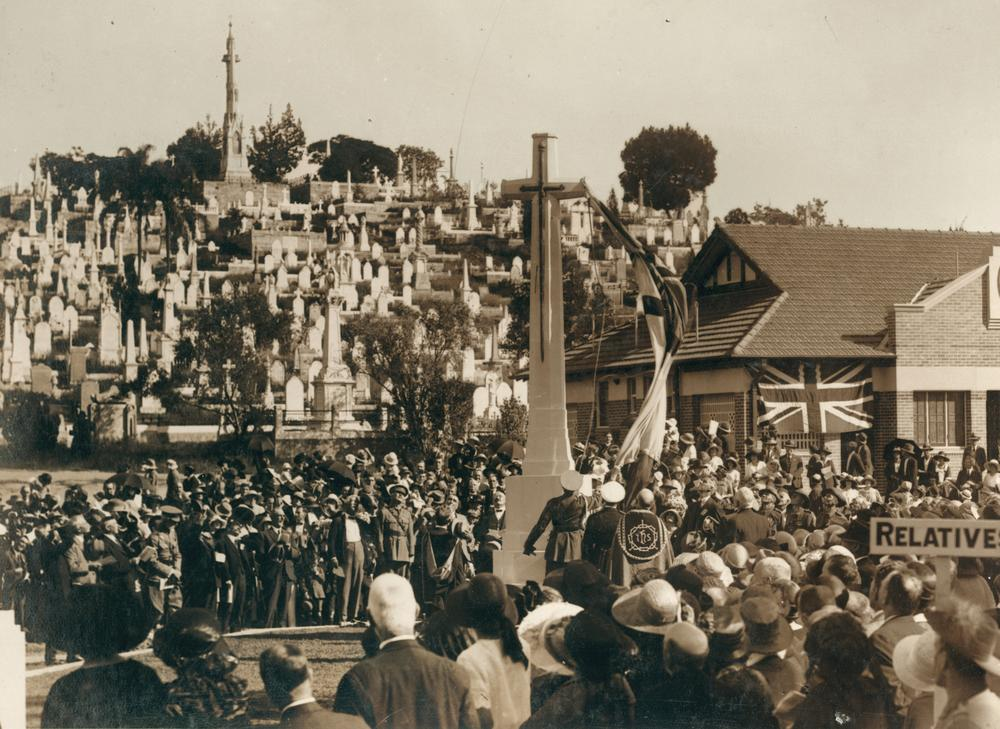
Unveiling ceremony, Anzac Day 1924, Toowong Cemetery, Brisbane, Australia

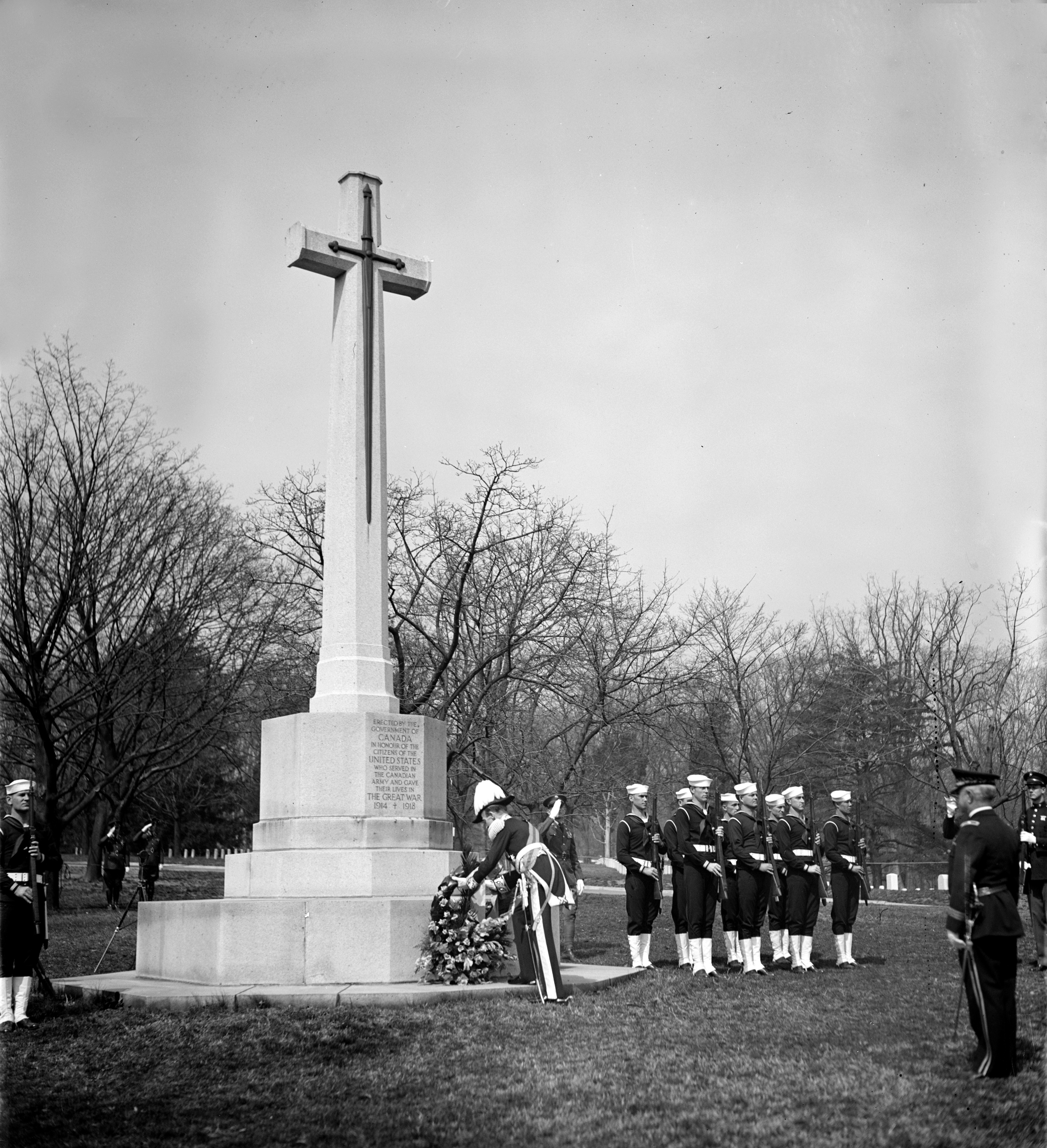
Governor General Lord Tweedsmuir laying a wreath at the Canadian Cross of Sacrifice in 1937

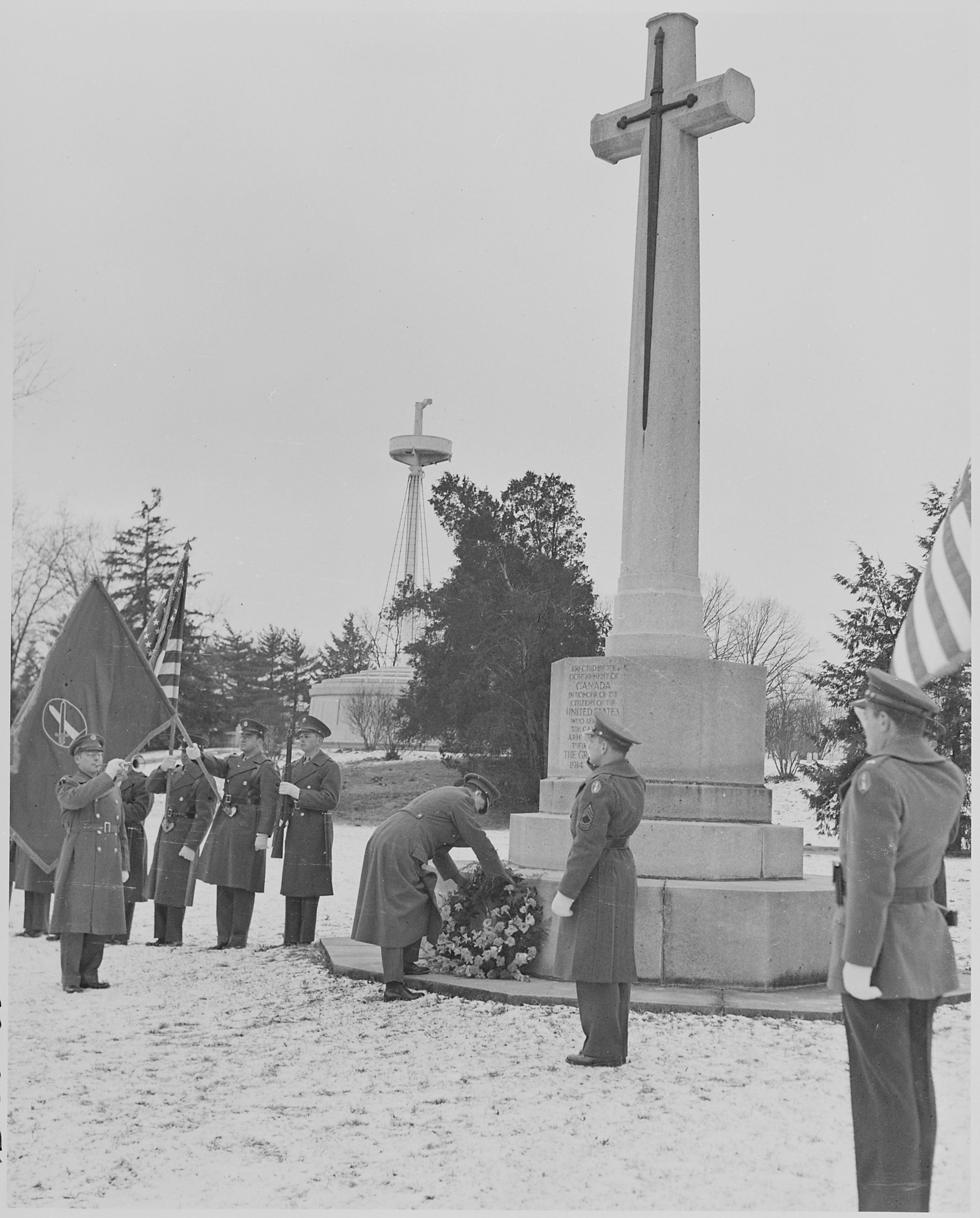
Field Marshal Harold Alexander laying a wreath at the Canadian Cross of Sacrifice in 1947

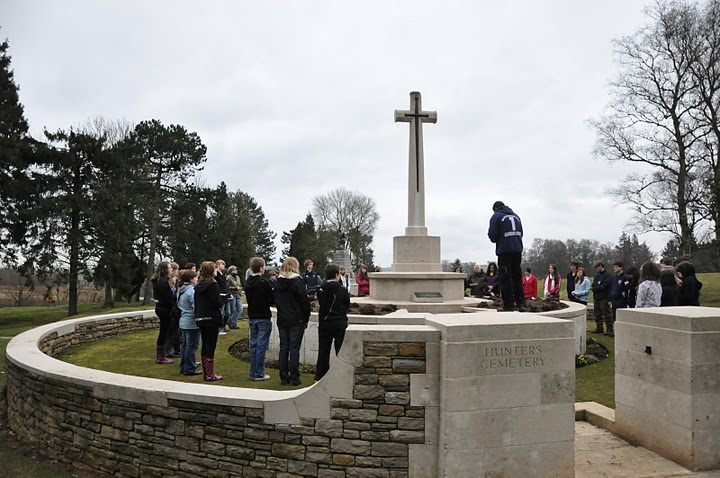
Schoolchildren paying their respects at Hunters Cemetery, Newfoundland Park, Beaumont Hamel

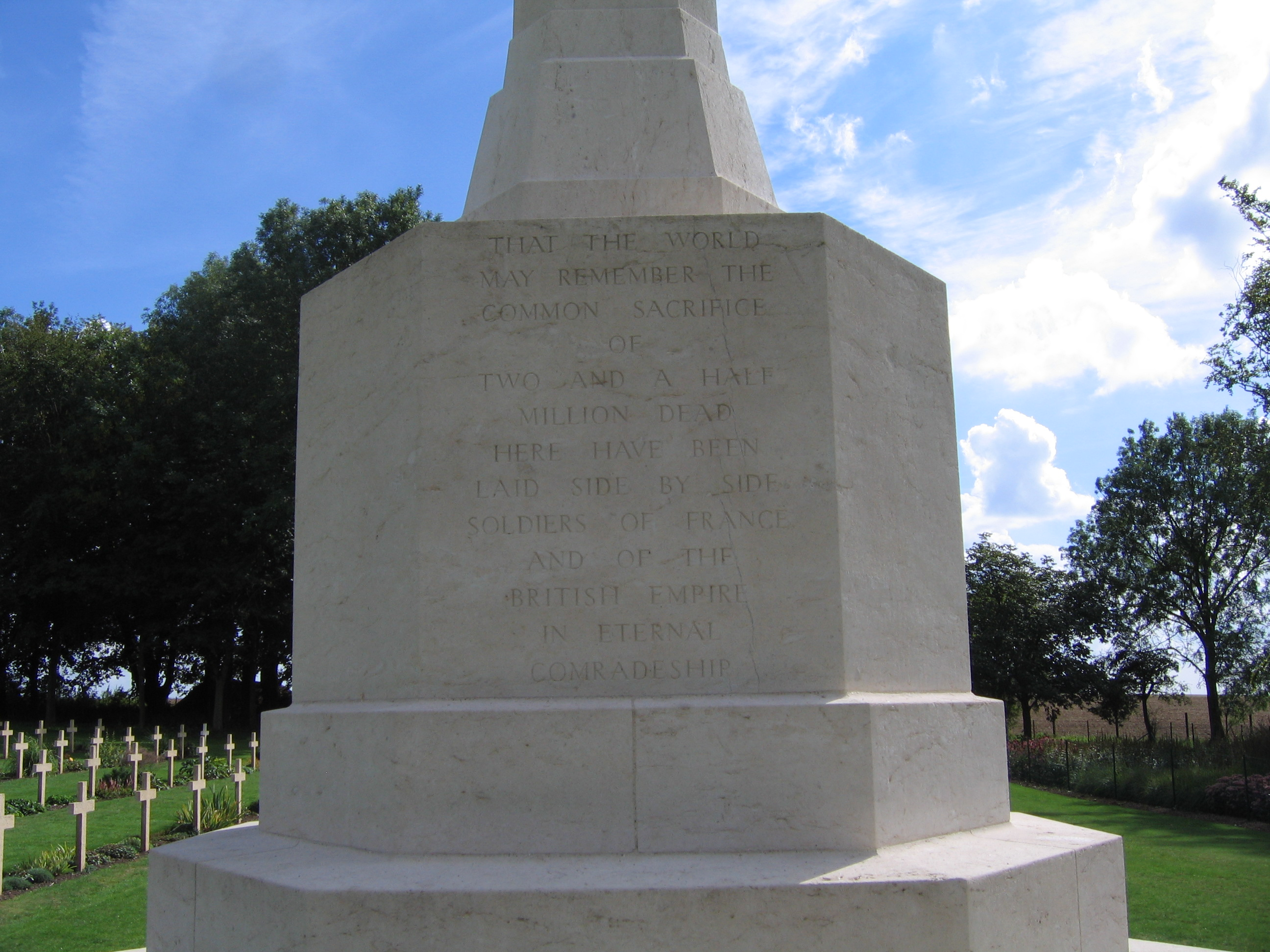
English inscription on the Anglo-French Cross of Sacrifice at the Thiepval Memorial

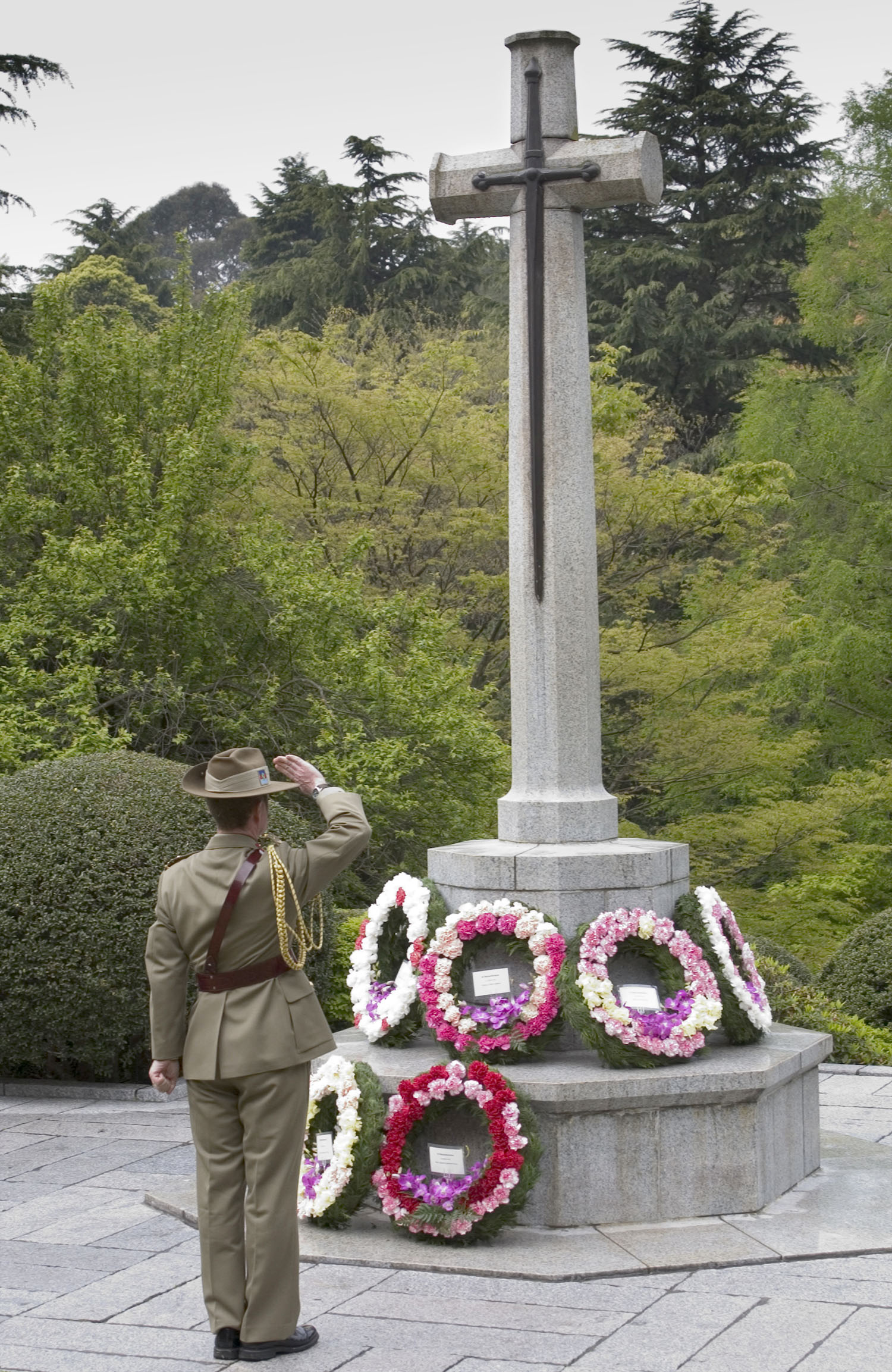
Major General David Morrison saluting at a Cross of Sacrifice at Yokohama War Cemetery, on Anzac Day 2006

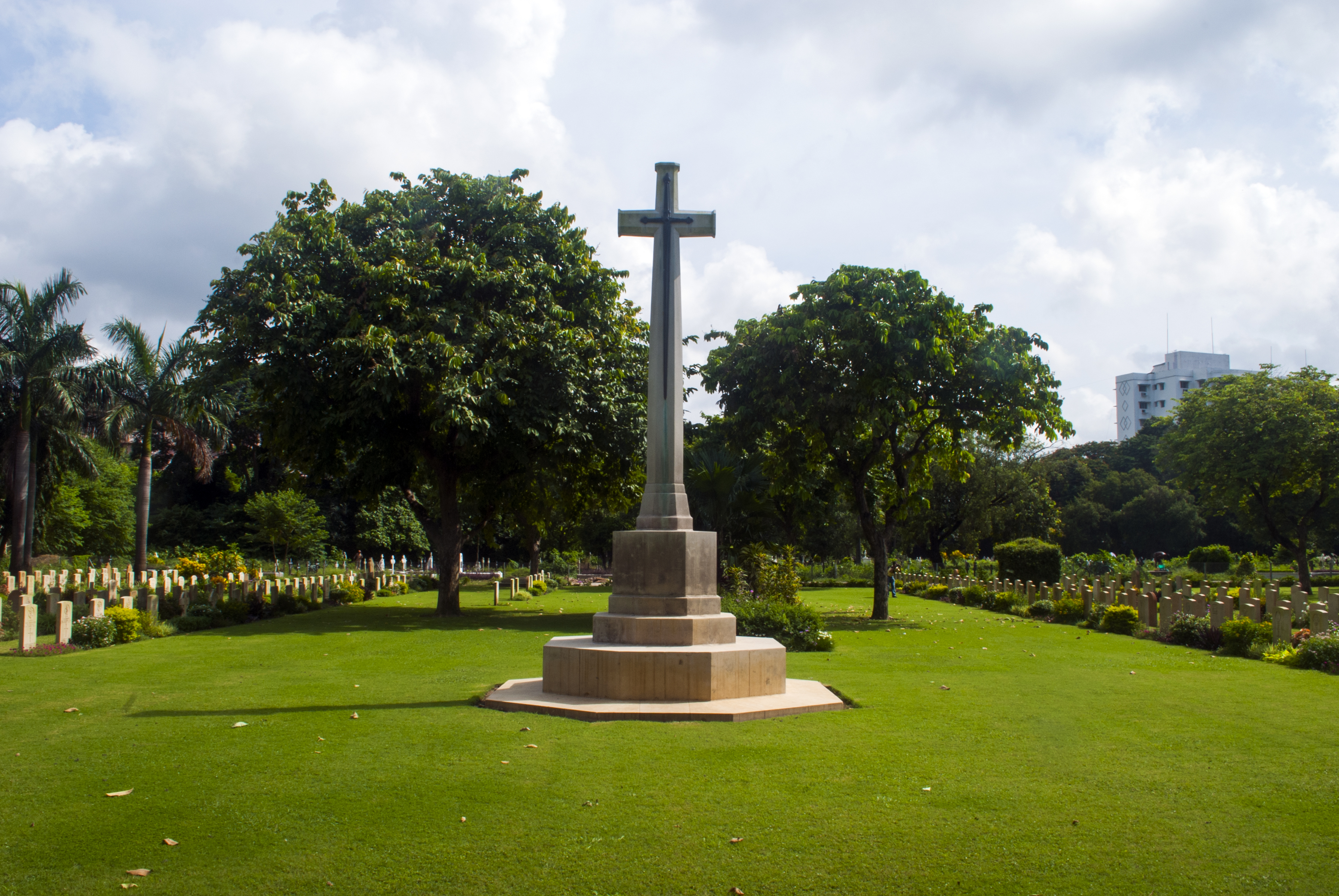
Cross of Sacrifice at Bhawanipur Cemetery, Kolkata. India

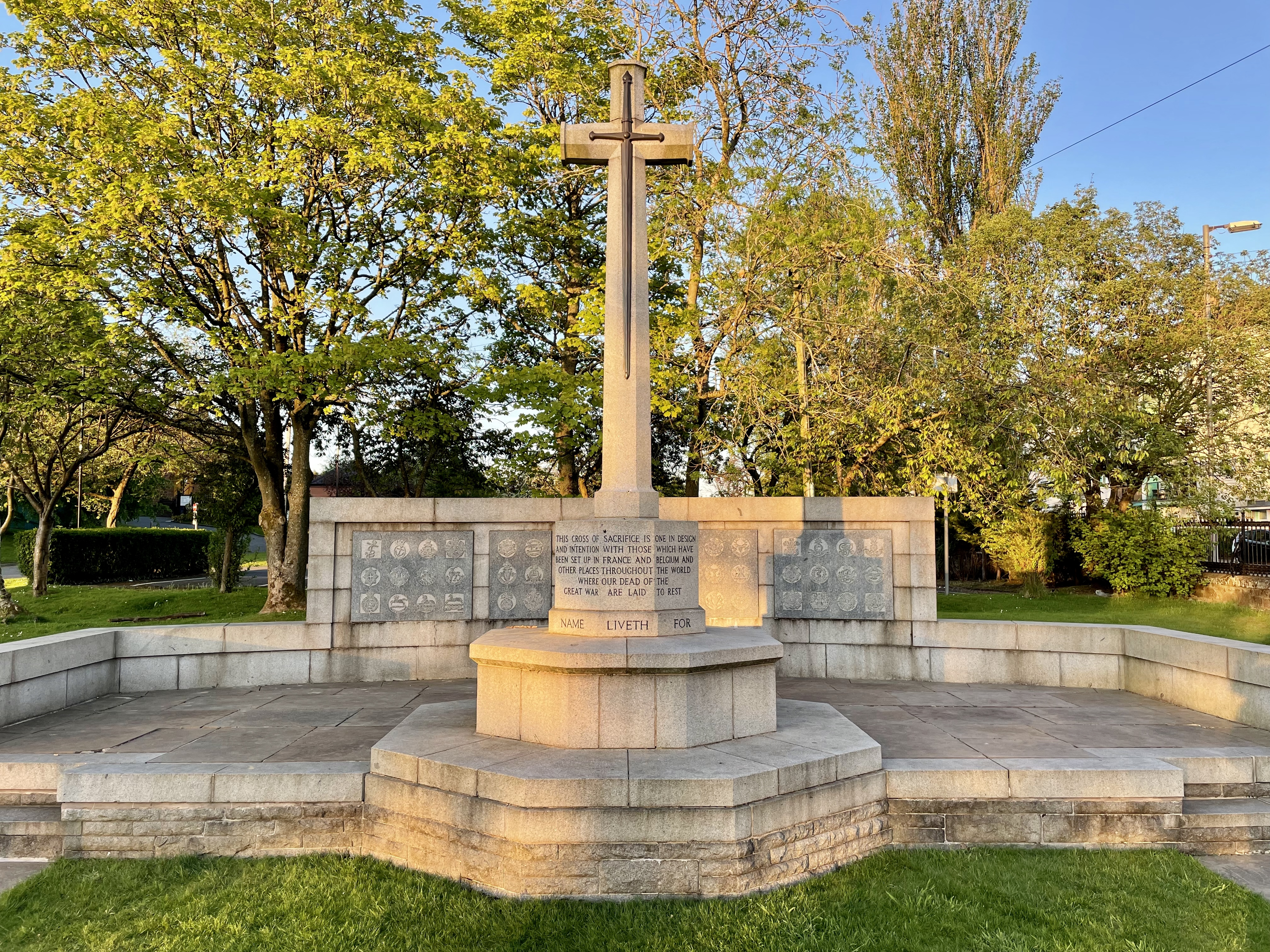
Cross of Sacrifice in Western Necropolis, Glasgow, Scotland.

== See also ==
- World War I memorials
- Stone of Remembrance
