= Gibraltar War Memorial =

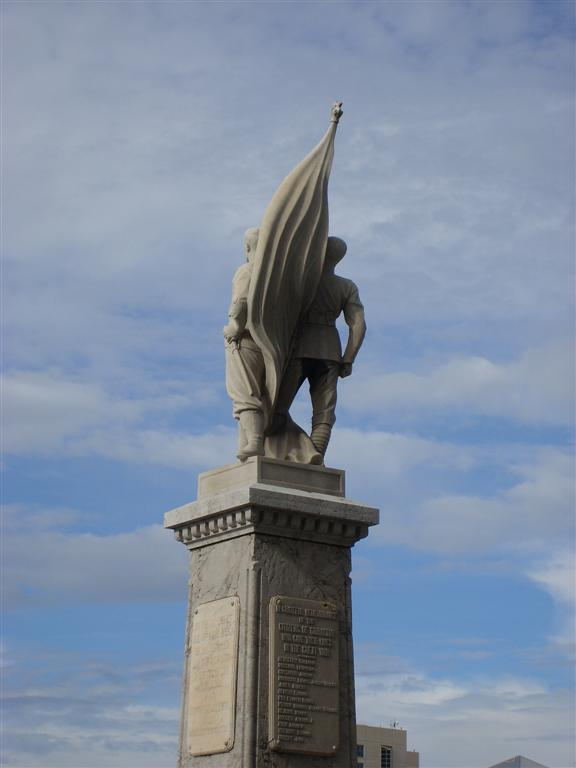
- Gibraltar War Memorial on Line Wall Road
- Interactive map of Gibraltar War Memorial
- Location: Line Wall Road, Gibraltar
- Coordinates: 36°08′27″N 5°21′17″W
- Designer: Jose Piquet Catoli
- Type: Military
- Material: Carrara Marble
- Opening date: 1923
- Dedicated to: The dead from World War I

The Gibraltar War Memorial is a First World War monument located on Line Wall Road in the British Overseas Territory of Gibraltar. Also known as the British War Memorial, it was sculpted by Jose Piquet Catoli of Spain and unveiled in 1923. Adjacent to the monument on the esplanade built in 1921 are several memorial tablets, as well as two Russian guns from the Crimean War.

== History ==
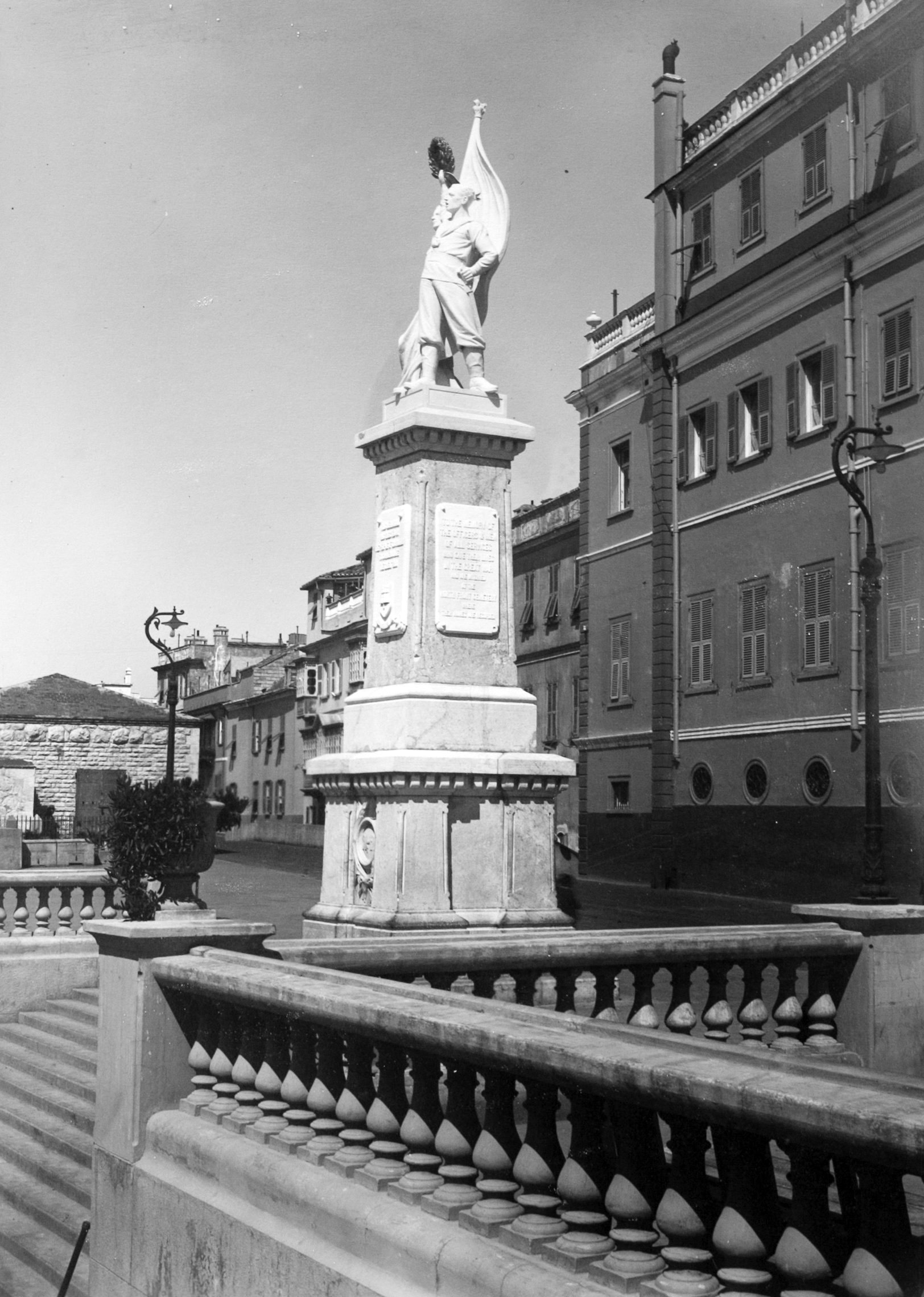
The Gibraltar War Memorial in the 1920s

The Gibraltar War Memorial, also referred to as the British War Memorial, is located to the west of Line Wall Road in Gibraltar, the British Overseas Territory at the southern end of the Iberian Peninsula. The monument, which commemorates the fallen of the First World War, was sculpted by Jose Piquet Catoli of Barcelona, Spain and was constructed of Carrara marble. The memorial was unveiled by the Governor of Gibraltar, Sir Charles Monro, 1st Baronet (1860–1929), during a ceremony on 27 September 1923. The inscription reads: "To the Memory of all Officers and Seamen of the Gibraltar Straits Patrol Who Gave Their Lives for Their King and Empire in the Great War."

The monument is positioned on an esplanade and steps, west of the City Hall and John Mackintosh Square, upon which there are several inscribed tablets. On one tablet is inscribed: "To Our Heroes of Gibraltar and of the Straits Patrol 1914–1918 This tablet is Dedicated by the Association of Gibraltarian Residents in the Argentine Republic." Another is inscribed with:

This Esplanade and These Steps Were Constructed in the Year 1921 During the Governorship of His Excellency General Sir Horace Lockwood Smith Dorrien G.C.B., G.C.M.G., D.S.O. They Form a Memoria of His Regard for the Welfare of the People of Gibraltar

Smith-Dorrien (1858–1930) served as Governor of Gibraltar from 1918 to 1923. The governor had the esplanade and steps built along the Line Wall Curtain for the residents of Gibraltar in 1921. A third tablet's inscription reads:

This Tablet is Dedicated by Belgium to the Fortress of Gibraltar in Grateful Recognition of the Warmth and Understanding With Which During the Years 1940–1944 It Received Belgians from Enemy Occupied Europe on Their Way to Serve in the Allied Struggle for Freedom 21st July 1945

Adjacent to the monument are two Russian guns that were captured during the Crimean War (1854–1856). The inscription reads: "These Four Russian Guns, Captured in the Crimea 1854—1856, Were Presented to Gibraltar by the British Government 1858." The guns were given to Gibraltar in 1858 for its assistance during that conflict. The other two pieces of artillery are located at the entrance to the Gibraltar Botanic Gardens, also known as the Alameda Gardens.

== Gallery ==
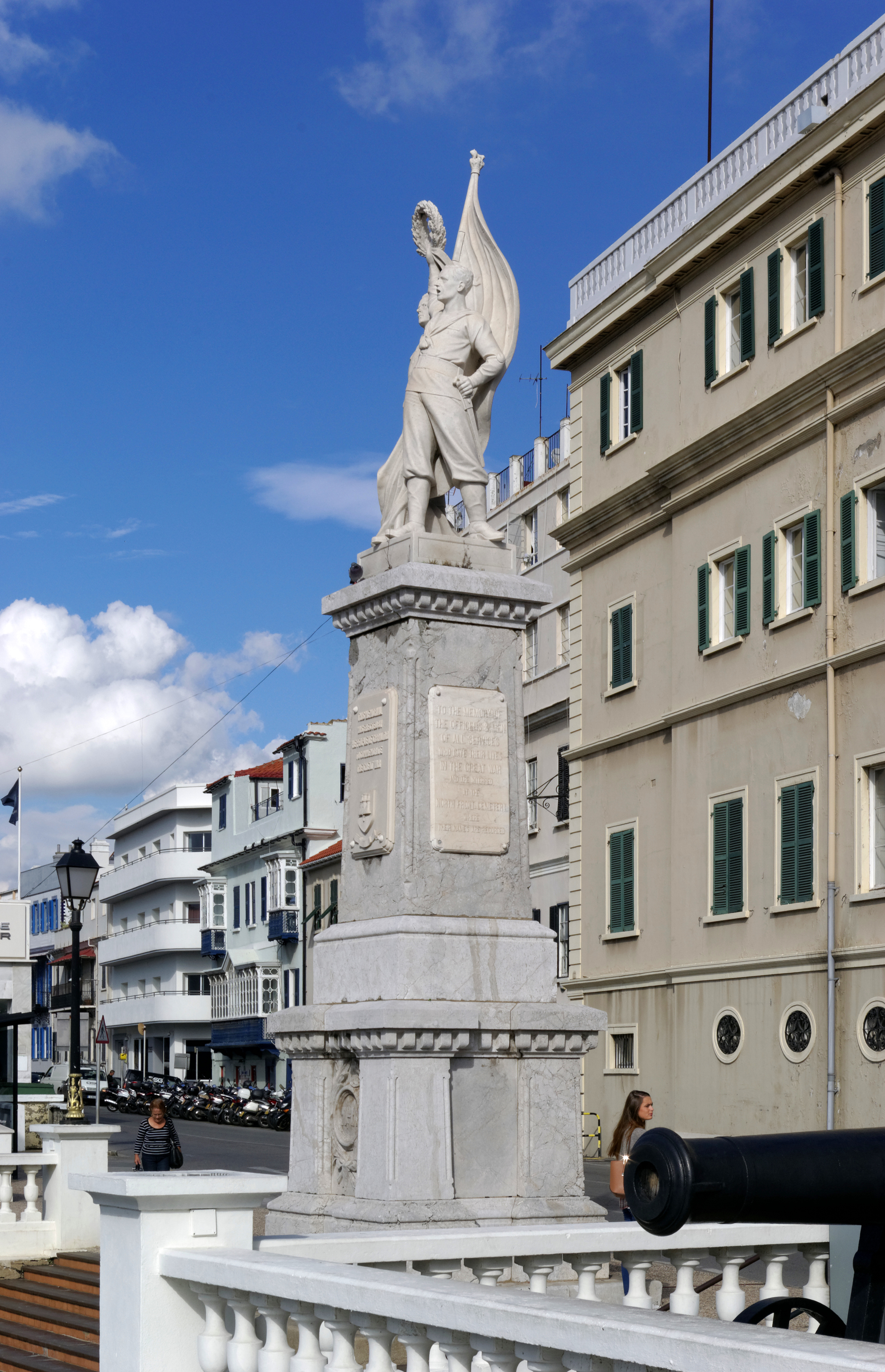
Gibraltar War Memorial

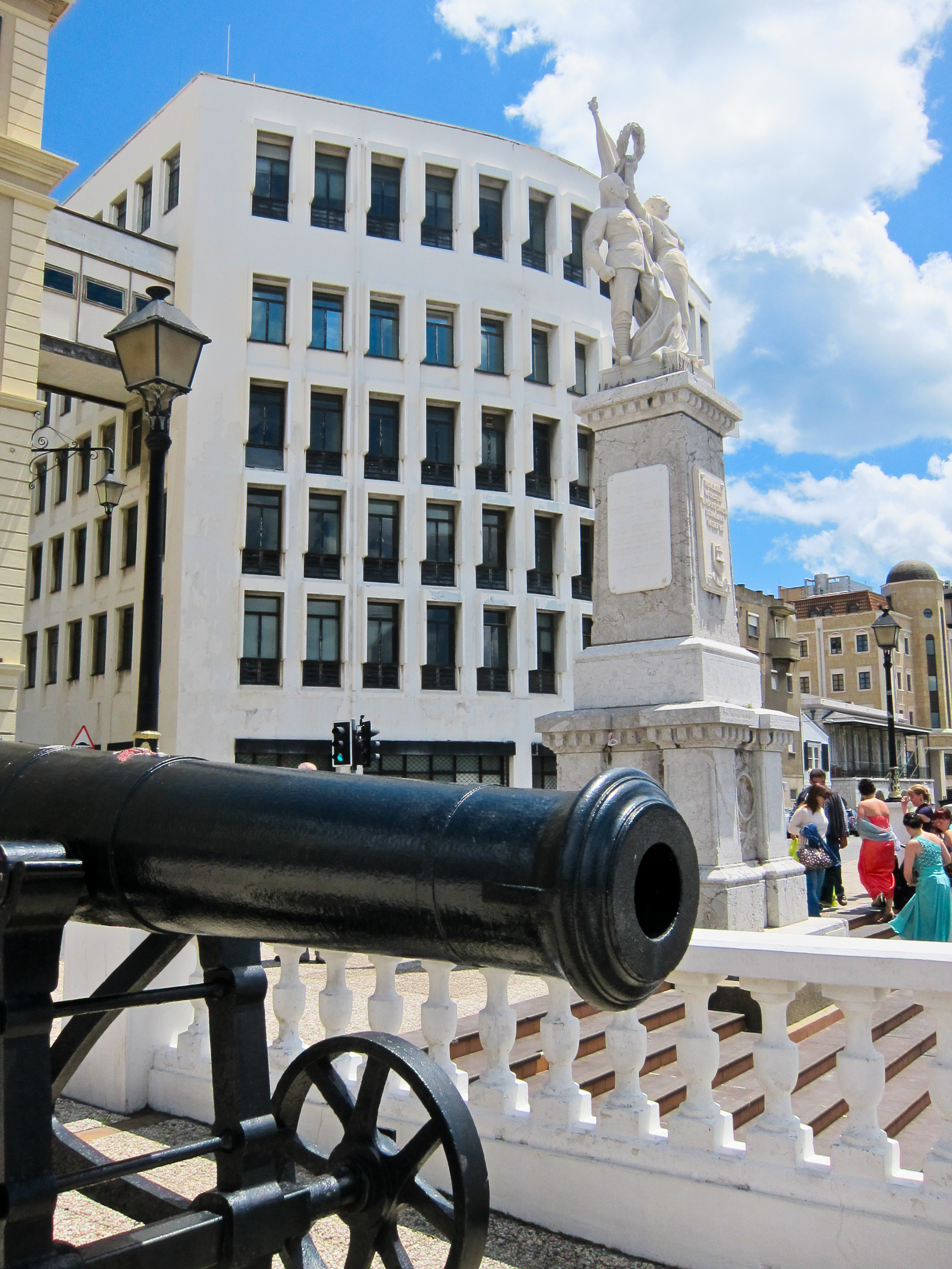
Gibraltar War Memorial and Russian gun

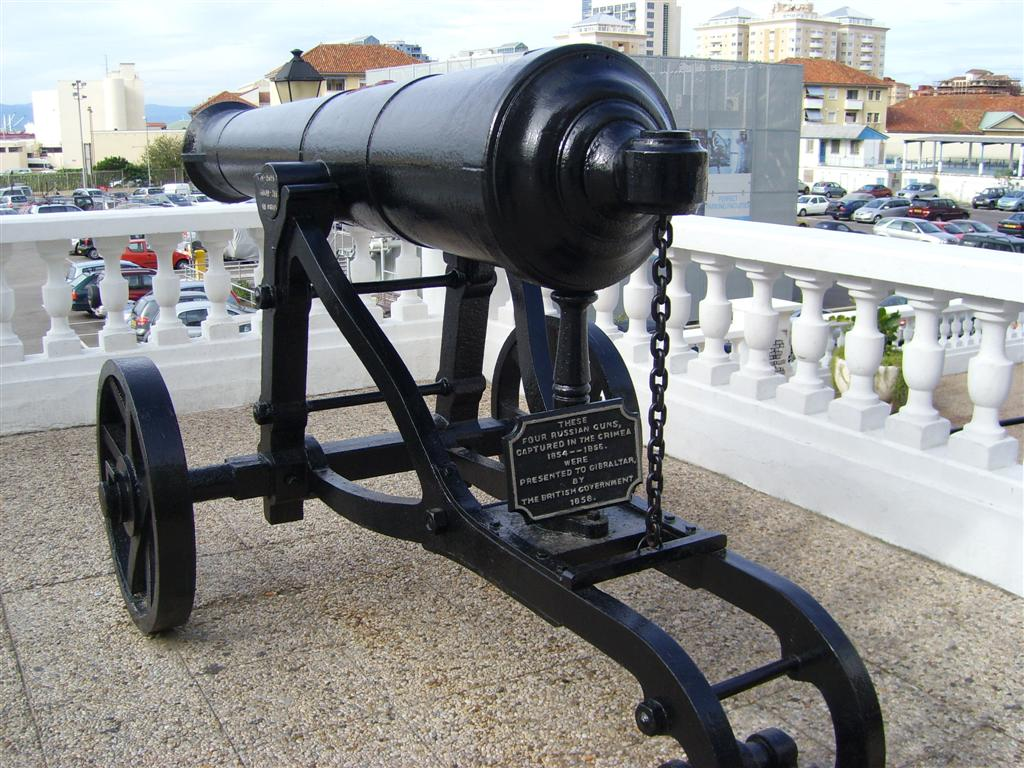
Russian gun captured in the Crimean War

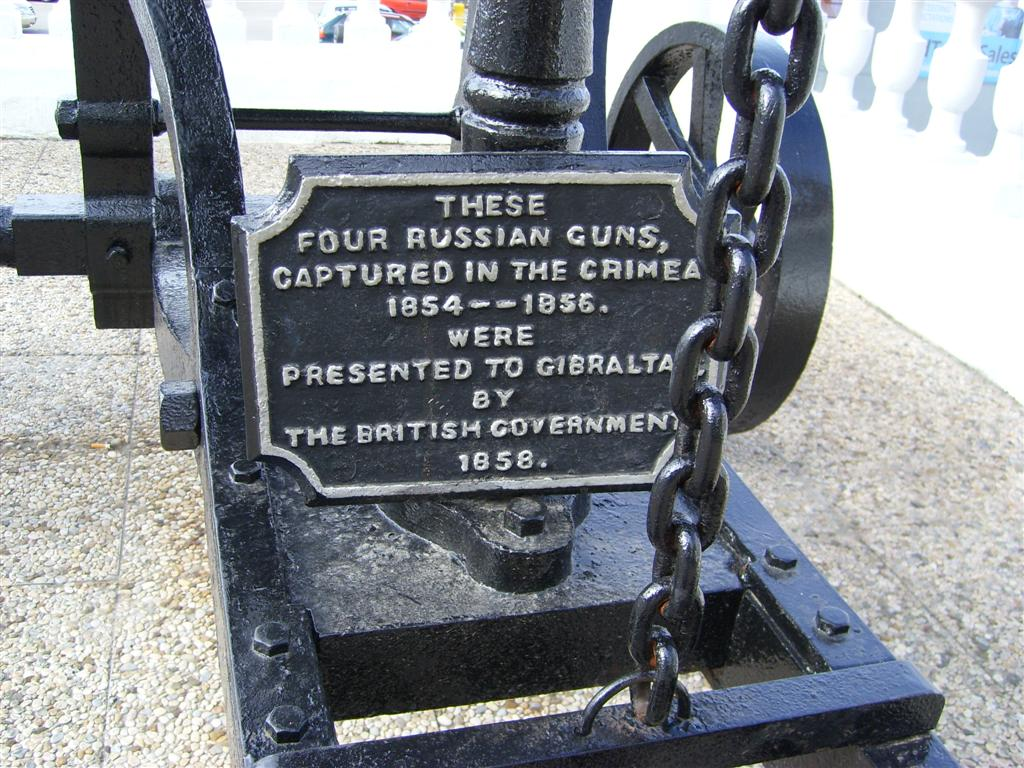
Plaque on Russian gun which reads: These four Russian guns, captured in the Crimea 1854--1856. were presented to Gibraltar by the British Government 1858.
