= Zoca Flank Battery =

Artillery battery in Gibraltar

- Part of Fortifications of Gibraltar
- Gibraltar
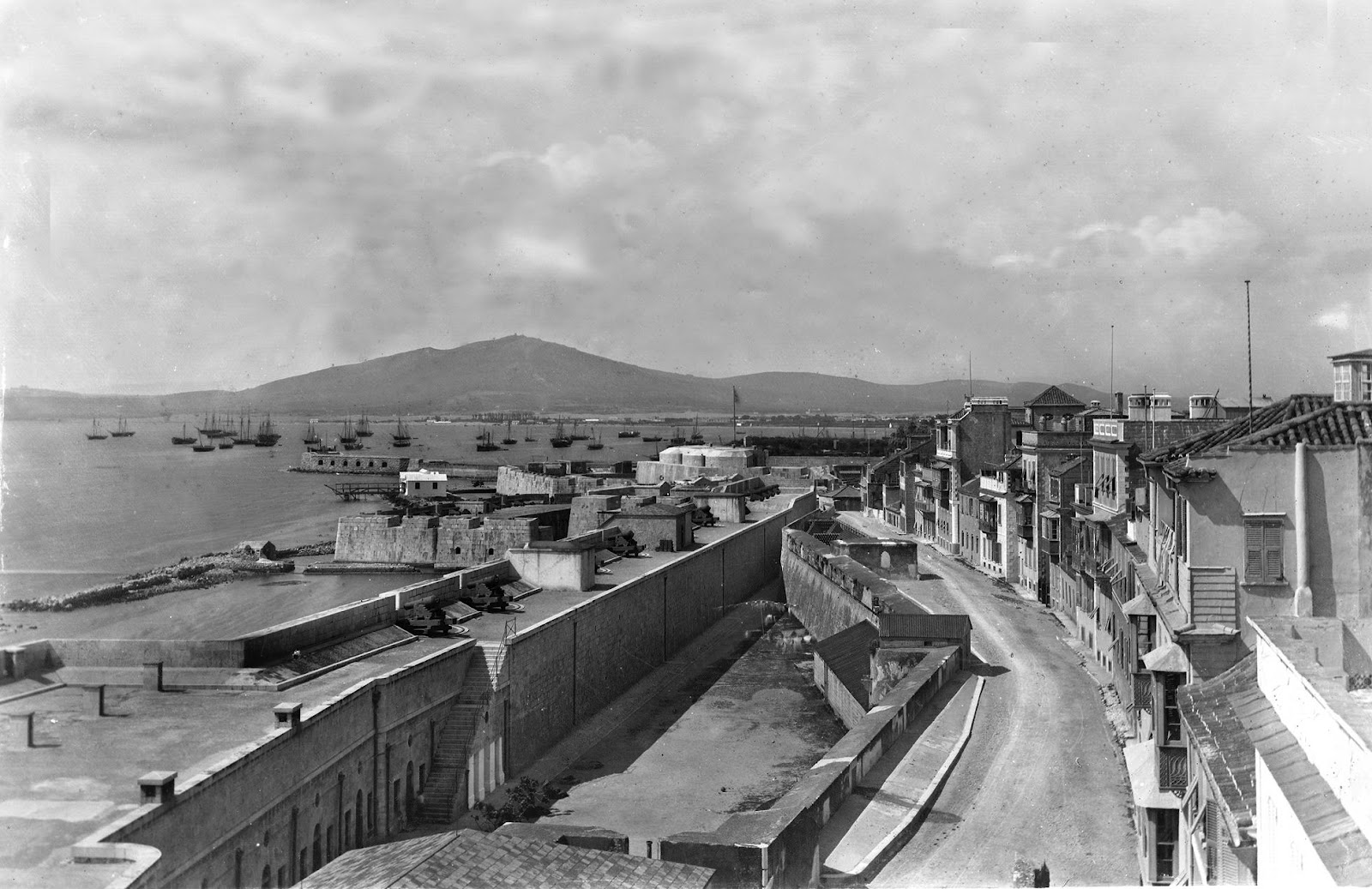
- Zoca Flank - Line Wall - North of Commercial Square by George Washington Wilson c. 1890

Site information
- Type: Artillery battery
- Owner: Ministry of Defence

Location
- Location in Gibraltar
- Coordinates: 36.141607°N 5.354902°W

Site history
- Built: 1879

Zoca Flank Battery is an artillery battery on the west side of the British Overseas Territory of Gibraltar.

== History ==
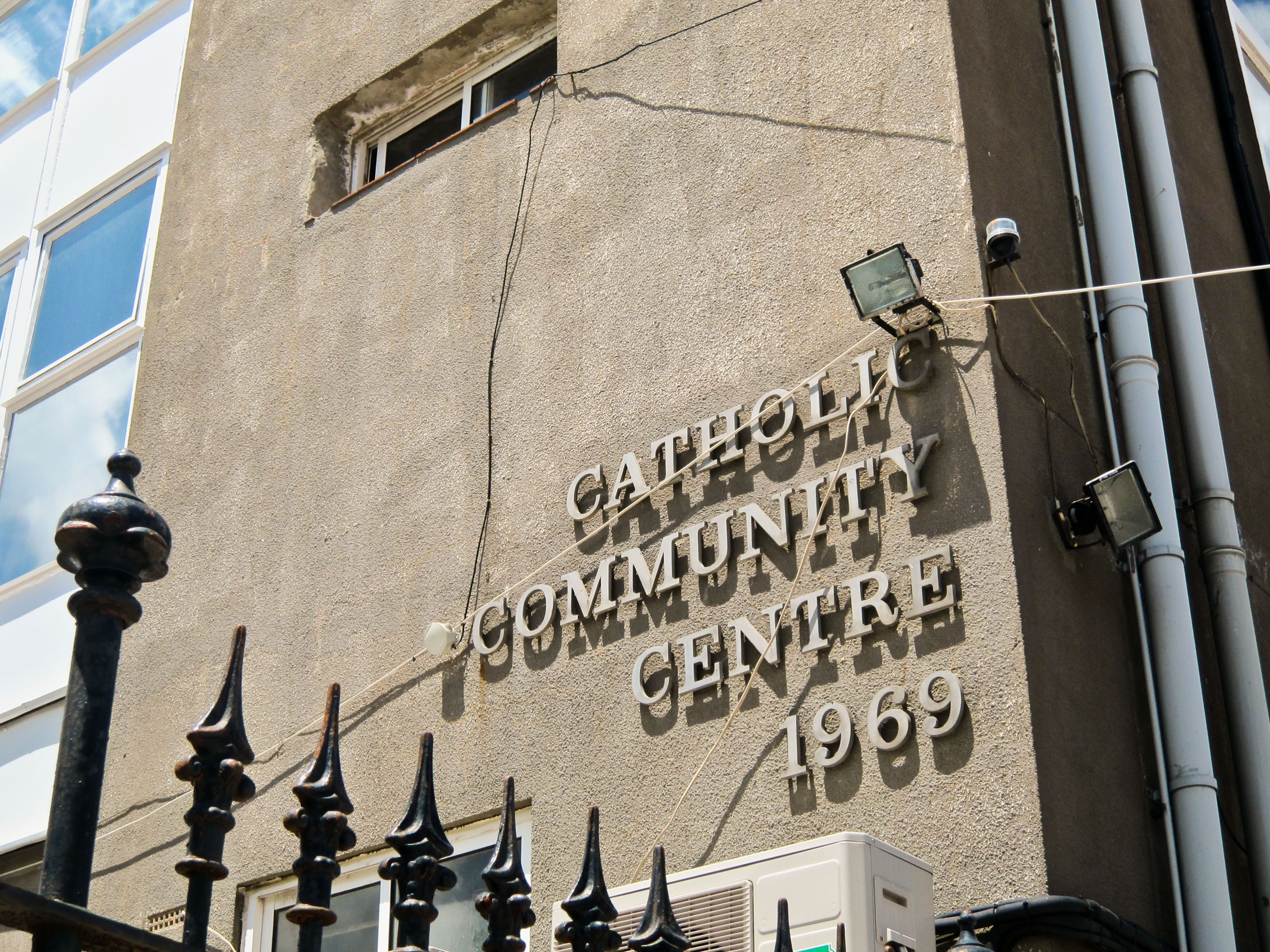
The Catholic Community Centre was built on top of Zoca Flank Battery in 1969.

Zoca was originally a small bastion between the two larger Orange and King's Bastions. This had been the site of a fortification since Gibraltar's Moorish period when there was a tower here on the old Moorish city wall. In 1627 when Gibraltar was under Spanish control, the tower was reduced and by the time of the Great Siege (1779-1783) it had become a broad platform incorporating an artillery battery. Its Spanish-era appearance is shown in a 1627 drawing by Luis Bravo de Acuna, and John Drinkwater depicts its rebuilt form in his contemporary account of the Great Siege.

During construction of the battery the line of defence was moved from the Line Wall Curtain to Prince Albert's Front. Today an underground garage has been constructed in the gap but visitors can still see the remains of the original round tower.

The battery was upgraded between 1877–79 with the installation, at a cost of £4,095, of a 12.5 inch rifled muzzle-loading (RML) gun installed in a casemate built on top of the platform. The gun was protected by an iron shield known as a "Gibraltar Shield", like two similar RML guns on King's Bastion and Wellington Front.

During World War 2 the Anti-Aircraft Searchlight at King's Bastion was moved here, there was also a Gun Laying Radar installed.

The Catholic Community Centre was built on top of the battery in 1969 after Charles Caruana raised funds for its construction via the Gibraltar International Song Festival. Although the battery itself remained intact, the 12.5 inch gun was removed from its mounting and relocated to a nearby position on the ground. In 2010 plans to demolish the community centre and expose the battery were announced. The news was welcomed by the Gibraltar Heritage Trust.
