= Prince Albert's Front =

Coordinates: 36°08′33″N 5°21′17″W

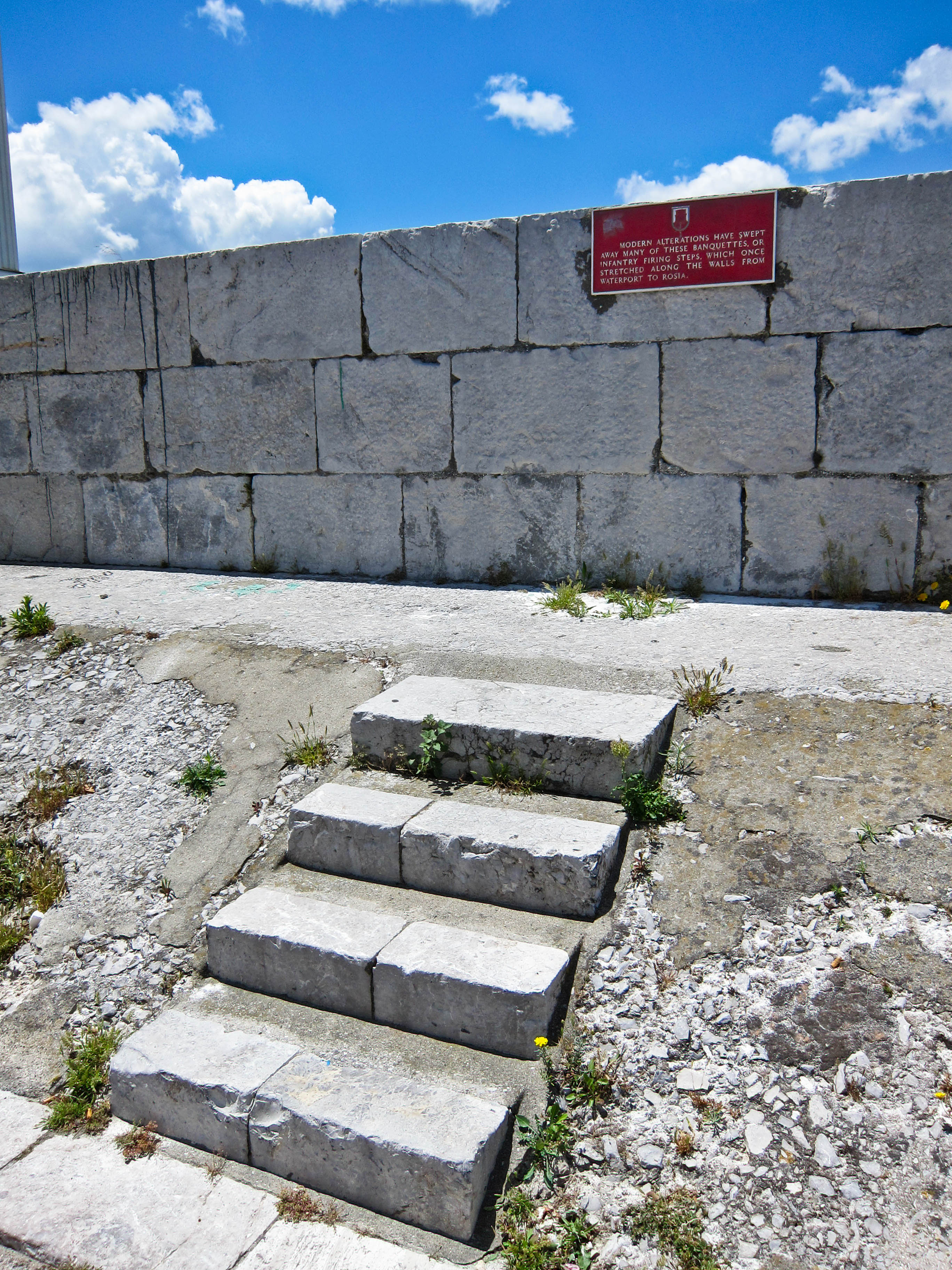
These steps on Prince Albert's Front were called banquettes, or "infantry firing steps", and they at one time were spaced at intervals down the wall from Waterfront to Rosia Bay.

Prince Albert's Front is a curtain wall that formerly comprised part of the seafront fortifications of Gibraltar. It runs between the King's Bastion and Orange Bastion. The Front was constructed in 1842 after a report by Major General Sir John Thomas Jones recommended improving Gibraltar's seafront defences to guard against the threat of an amphibious assault. It was named after Prince Albert, Queen Victoria's prince consort. The Front straightened out the line of Gibraltar's coastal curtain wall; parts of the original curtain wall, some of which dates from the Moorish period over 500 years ago, can still be seen.

The Front was intended to be armed with 68-pdr cannon but their deployment did not proceed due to lack of funds. By 1859, six such guns had been installed on the Front along with another four in the Windmill Hill Batteries. The Front is interrupted half-way along by a flat platform called Zoca Flank, on which a 12.5-inch 38-ton rifled muzzle loader (RML) was installed by 1879. By the 1880s, three 80-pdr RMLs had been installed on the right curtain wall.

== Bibliography ==
- Hughes, Quentin; Migos, Athanassios (1995). Strong as the Rock of Gibraltar. Gibraltar: Exchange Publications. OCLC 48491998.
