= HMS Rooke (1946 shore establishment) =

Former Royal Navy shore establishment

Coordinates: 36.140301°N 5.356393°W

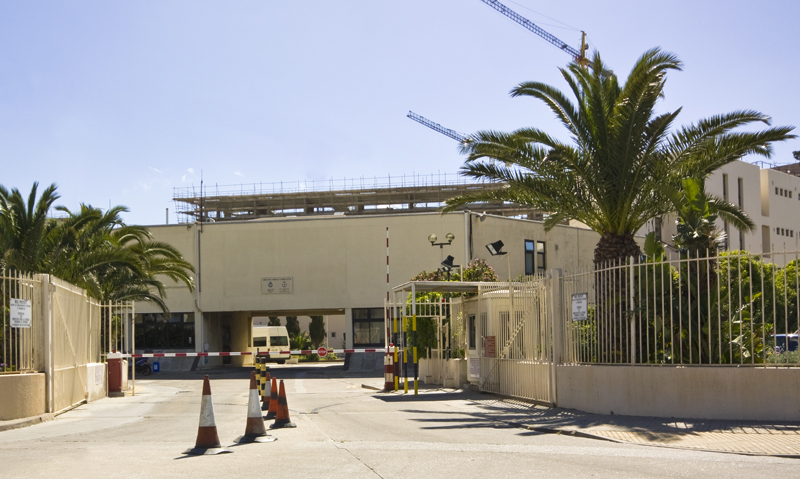
Entrance to HMS Rooke at Queensway in Gibraltar.

HMS Rooke was a shore establishment of the British Armed Forces in Gibraltar from 1946 to 1990.

Located on Queensway near King's Bastion, the base replaced the Royal Navy Gibraltar Squadron's HMS Cormorant and became a Joint Service Base. The Royal Navy closed the base and paid it off in 1996, and it became headquarters for the Gibraltar Defence Police until their move to the HM Naval Base in 2016. The base was named after Admiral George Rooke who led the Anglo-Dutch Capture of Gibraltar in 1704.

The Gibraltar Squadron's headquarters is located further south at Permanent Joint Operating Base (PJOB) Gibraltar.

The entire complex has since been demolished.
