= Line Wall Curtain =

Defensive curtain wall in Gibraltar

- Part of Fortifications of Gibraltar
- Line Wall Road/Queensway, Gibraltar
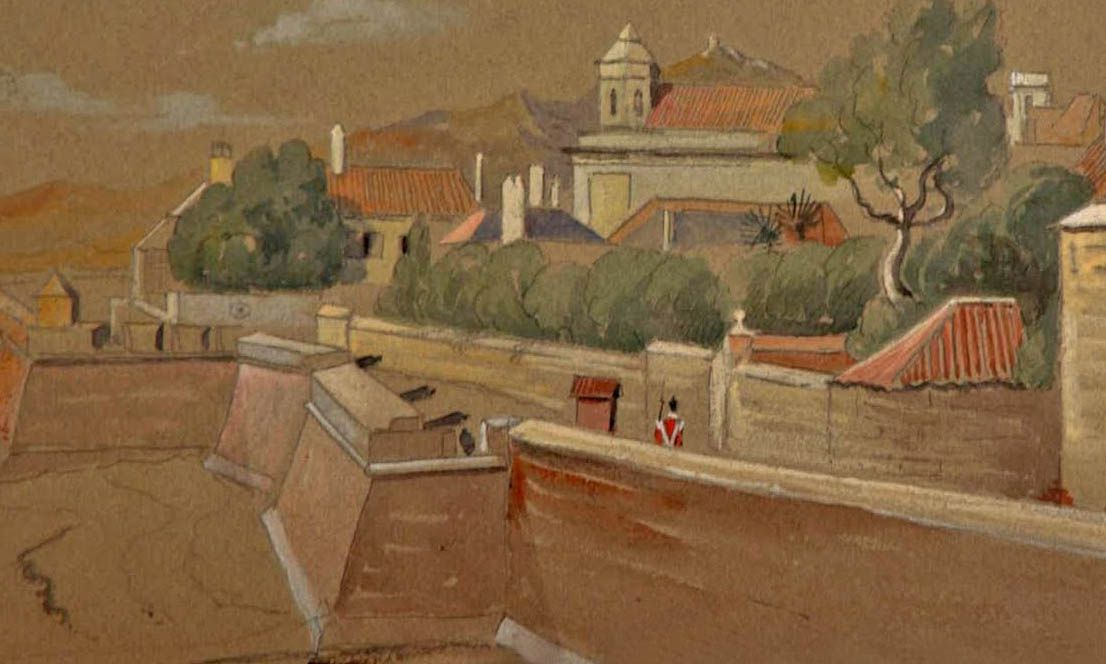
- Line Wall by Frederick Leeds Edridge in 1830

Site information
- Type: Defensive wall
- Owner: Government of Gibraltar
- Open to the public: Yes
- Condition: Mostly intact

Location
- Location of the centre section of Line Wall Curtain (red dot) within Gibraltar
- Coordinates: 36.138438°N 5.354897°W

The Line Wall Curtain is a defensive curtain wall that forms part of the fortifications of the British Overseas Territory of Gibraltar.

== Description ==
The Line Wall runs from the North Bastion south along the western coast of the town to Engineer Battery, just south of the South Mole. It protected the town from bombardment from ships in the Bay of Gibraltar and from troops landing from the sea. The Line Wall Curtain, as it stands, was built by the British in the 18th century running north–south as part of the Line Wall western defenses.

== History ==
The wall incorporates, and is to some extent built upon, older Spanish and Moorish fragments. The earlier wall from the Moorish period incorporated square and round towers along its length, whose traces were still visible in the 1770s. It was pierced by clay pipes that carried water from a well down the slopes, used for supplying water to galleys moored in the bay. An aqueduct ran along the Line Wall, enclosed in its masonry, to the Waterport, where it replenished a reservoir from which water for the galleys was drawn. The Waterport was where the galleys were built (now Grand Casemates Square), and where they could be anchored alongside the Old Mole that extended from the shore to the north.

As of 1836, the main defensive position in the Line Wall was the King's Bastion, at the centre of the harbour. This was built by General Sir Robert Boyd in 1772 on the site of an old Moorish gate that had been replaced by a Spanish bastion. It played a key role in the defence of Gibraltar during its Great Siege (1779–1783), providing the platform from which red hot shot was fired at the floating batteries of the Spanish forces. At that time, the main sea defenses consisted on the North, Montagu, Orange, King's and South bastions, with the line wall curtain connecting these positions.

In 1841 General Sir John Jones assessed the defenses at Gibraltar and made recommendations for improvements that set the pattern for many years. This included building new white ashlar limestone walls along the Line Wall, which was straightened and in some places relocated to make room for new batteries.
