= Montagu Bastion =

- Plataforma de San Andrés
- Part of Fortifications of Gibraltar
- Gibraltar
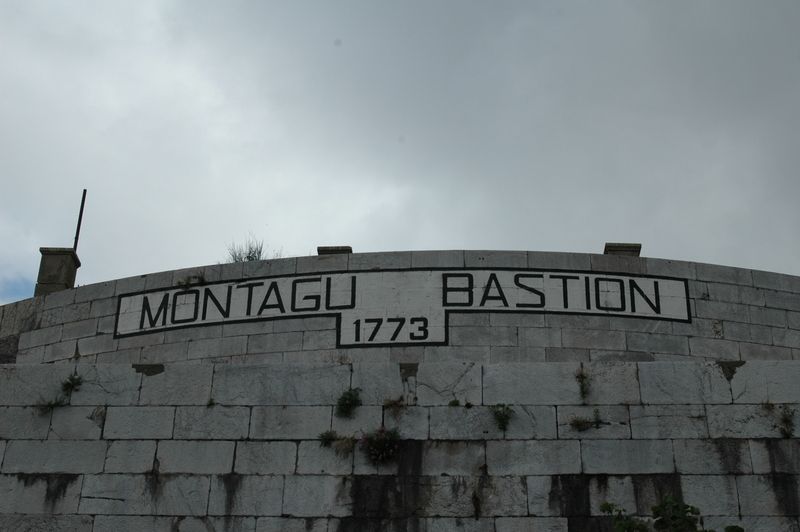
- Montagu Bastion

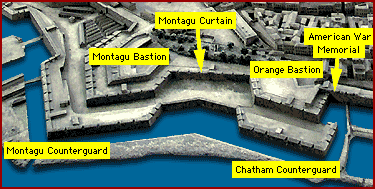
- Montagu and Orange Bastions as depicted on the scale Model of Gibraltar (1865) (now at the Gibraltar Museum)

Site information
- Type: Bastion
- Owner: Government of Gibraltar
- Open to the public: No

Location
- Location of Montagu Bastion within Gibraltar.
- Coordinates: 36.145291°N 5.354376°W

Site history
- Materials: Limestone; Concrete

The Montagu Bastion is one of many bastions which were designed to protect Gibraltar. Montagu was joined to Orange Bastion by a curtain wall known as Montagu Curtain and this bastion was protected by the Montagu Counterguard.

== History ==
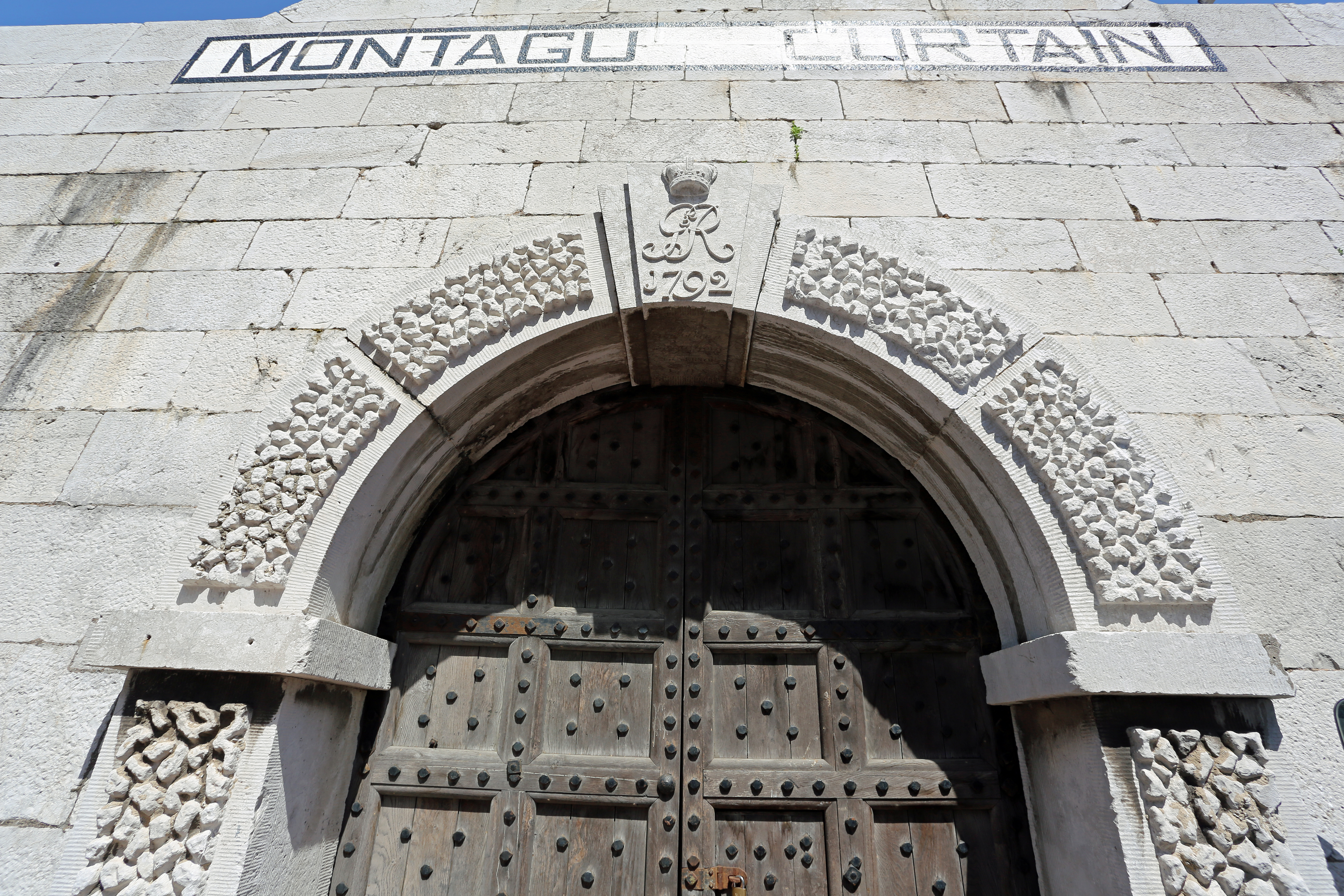
Montagu Gate dating from 1792 allowed access through Montagu Curtain immediately south of the bastion

Montagu Bastion was built on the remains of the Spanish Plataforma de San Andrés (Spanish: St. Andrew's Platform). A British bastion already existed on this site in the 1730s and was enlarged in 1773 giving it a pentagonal shape. In the 1790s, Sir William Green, oversaw improvements to Gibraltar's fortifications. As part of this he had the Montagu and the Orange Bastions extended and in addition he arranged for counterguards to be constructed in front of them in the Gibraltar Harbour. The counterguard, which mirrors the shape of its bastion, had been authorised by the Duke of Richmond in 1787. The theory behind constructing a counterguard, like the Montagu Counterguard in 1804, is that the enemy has to first capture the counterguard in order to take the bastion. Whilst attempting this the enemy would come under the direct fire of the bastion thwarting their plan. Another layer of protection was added when Montagu Counterguard was also given a breakwater that would deter amphibious assaults.

A new gate was cut through Montagu Curtain in 1792 and the counterguard was completed in 1804. By 1859 the bastion had 29 guns making it the most powerful bastion in Gibraltar. This was in addition to the guns at the counterguard and six guns on Montagu Curtain.

Three RML 10 inch 18 ton guns with Gibraltar Shields were installed in 1880 and removed in 1907.

In 1931 the bastion had four QF 3 inch 20 cwt guns installed. During World War II the bastion was equipped with two QF 3.7 inch AA guns.

== Today ==
Today the bastion houses a gym and offices for the Gibraltar Youth Service. The service runs four youth clubs and one of these meets at the bastion.

The bastion also houses a 42-bed youth hostel known as the Emile Hostel.

Remains of the three Gibraltar Shields which were used to protect the three RML 10 inch 18 ton guns are still in place today.
