= Robert Boyd (British Army officer) =

British Army officer

General Sir Robert Boyd KB
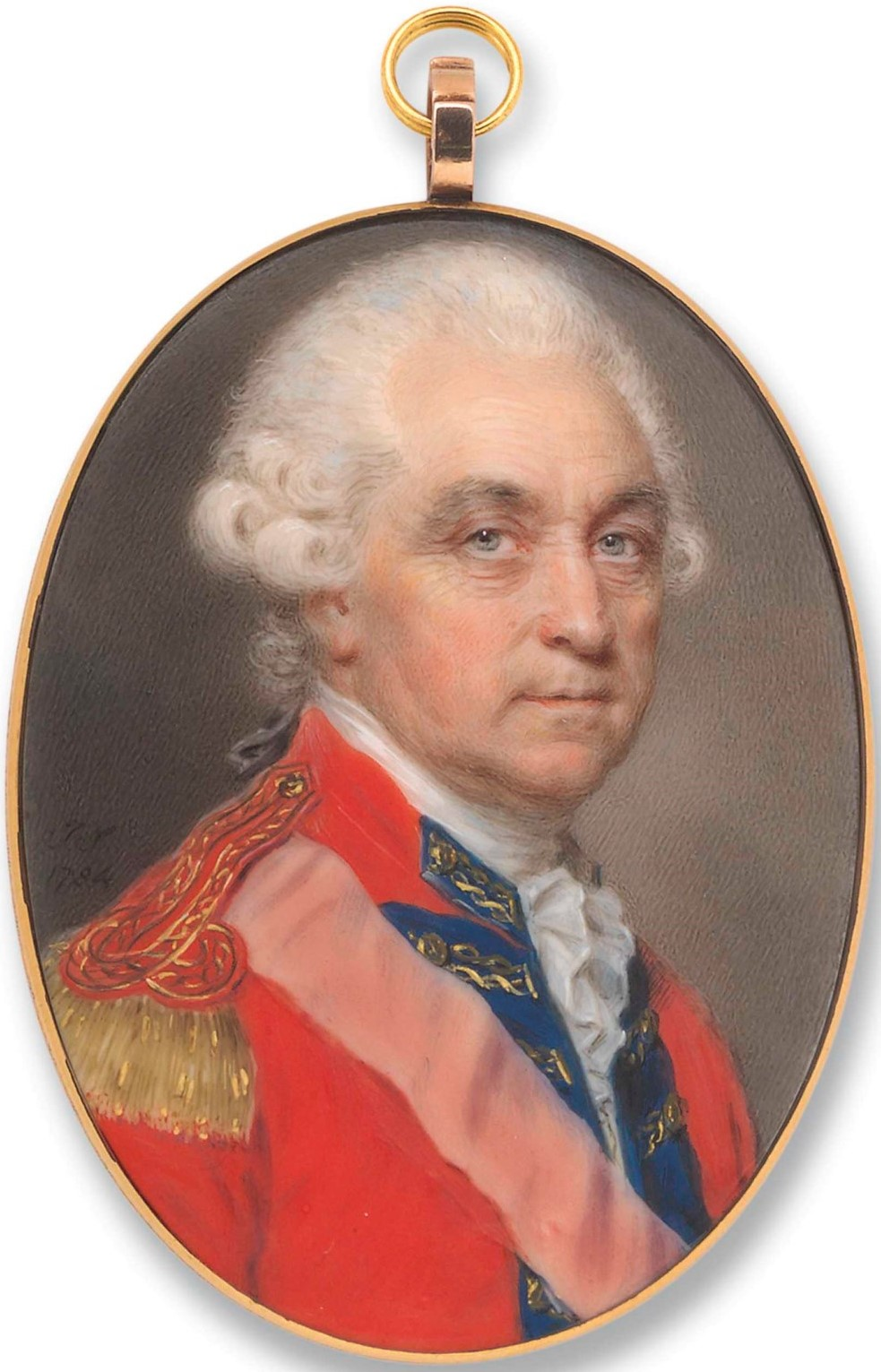
- Portrait by John Smart, 1784
- Born: 1710
- Died: 13 May 1794 (aged 84); Gibraltar
- Military career
- Allegiance: Great Britain
- Branch: British Army
- Service years: –1794
- Rank: General
- Conflicts: Seven Years' War
- Awards: Knight of the Order of the Bath

General Sir Robert Boyd KB (c. 1710 – 13 May 1794) was a British Army officer.

== Life ==
Boyd was baptised on 20 April 1710 at Richmond, Surrey and attended the University of Glasgow before entering the army in his father Ninian's profession of civilian storekeeper. In 1756 he served at the Siege of Minorca, and attempted to reach Admiral John Byng's fleet in an open boat with a message from the besieged garrison commander, William Blakeney. Boyd was a witness at the subsequent court-martial at which Byng was tried for the loss of the garrison.

He subsequently became commissary general to the Marquess of Granby in Germany (1758 to 1759); he then rose through the officer ranks to be three-times Governor of Gibraltar (1776 to 1777, 1790 and 1790 to 1794). Boyd considered that his and General Sir William Green's work on the King's Bastion in Gibraltar was so important that he asked to be buried there. The site of his burial is not indicated but his body is lost under cement used to strengthen the building still further in the 19th century. A memorial stone was placed within the King's Chapel but the marble stone in the King's Bastion read:

Within the walls of this bastion are deposited the mortal remains of the late General Sir Robert Boyd, K.B., governor of this fortress, who died on 13 May 1794, aged 84 years. By him the first stone of the bastion was laid in 1773, and under his supervision it was completed, when, on that occasion, in his address to the troops, he expressed a wish to see it resist the combined efforts of France and Spain, which wish was accomplished on 13 Sept. 1782, when, by the fire of this bastion, the flotilla expressly designed for the capture of this fortress were utterly destroyed.

Government offices
Preceded by John Irwin	Governor of Gibraltar; 1776–1777	Succeeded by Lord Heathfield
Preceded by Lord Heathfield	Governor of Gibraltar; 1790–1794	Succeeded by Charles Rainsford
