= Orange Bastion =

- Part of Fortifications of Gibraltar
- Line Wall Curtain, Line Wall Road, Gibraltar
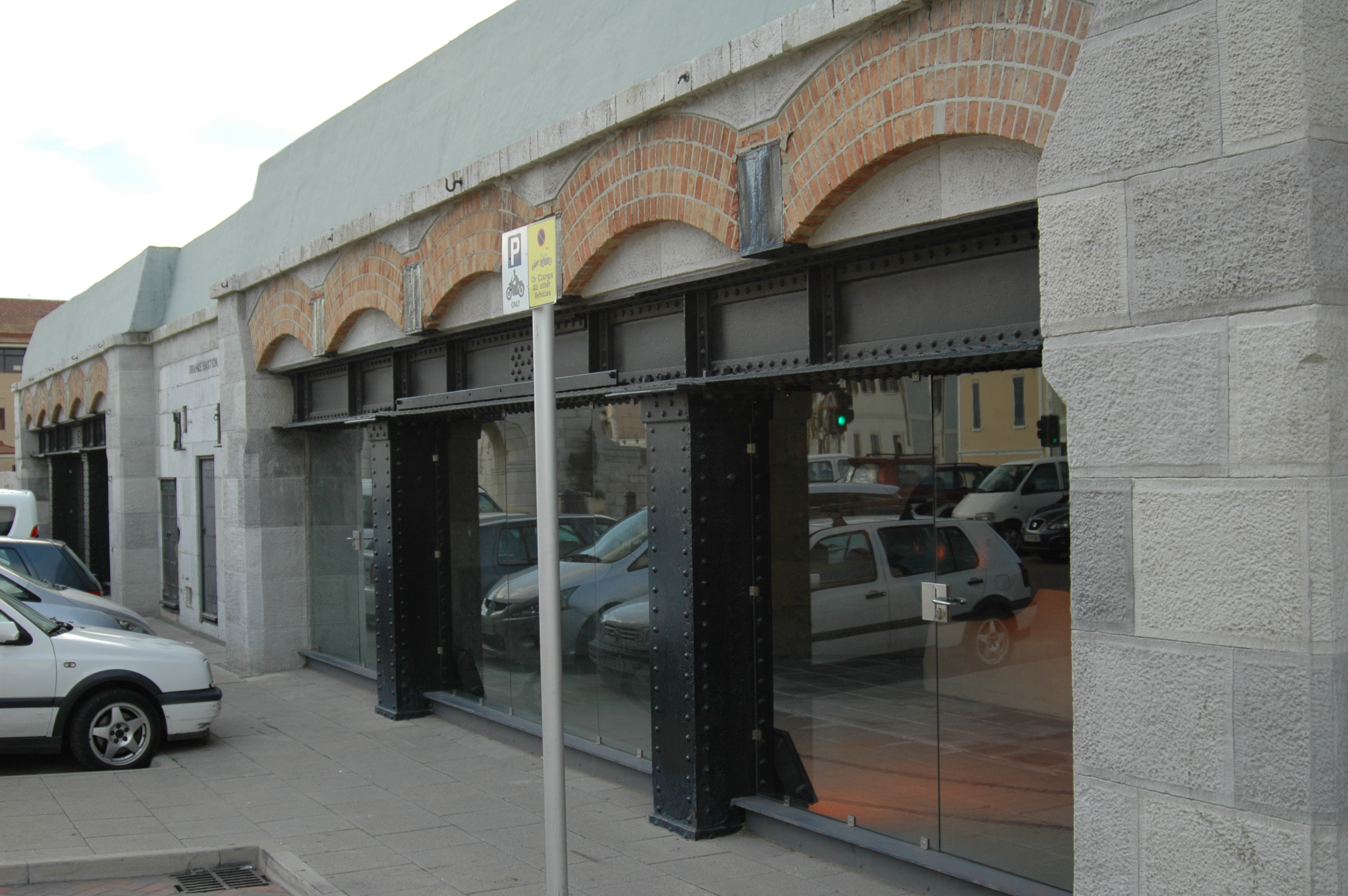
- Eastern façade of Orange Bastion on Line Wall Road.

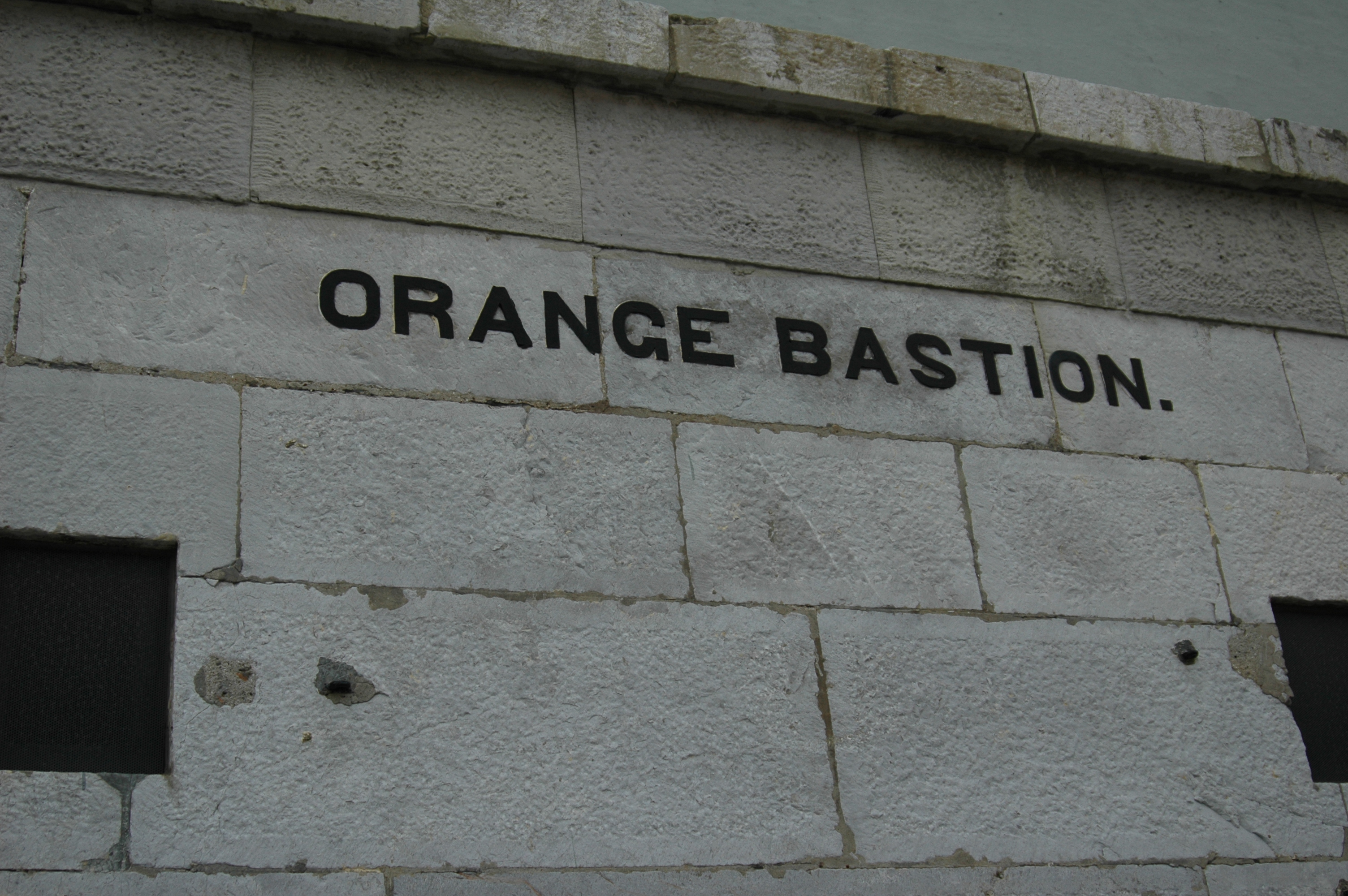
- Sign on the façade

Site information
- Type: Bastion
- Owner: Government of Gibraltar

Location
- Location of Orange Bastion within Gibraltar.
- Coordinates: 36.143455°N 5.354505°W

The Orange Bastion is one of the many bastions in the British Overseas Territory of Gibraltar, which served to protect it against its many sieges. It is located along the Line Wall Curtain and was built to protect Gibraltar Harbour against enemy attack.

== History ==
Named after King of England, William of Orange, this small asymmetric bastion was rebuilt by the British on the site of an older and larger Spanish bastion along the Line Wall Curtain. In 1758 the main face of the bastion held six guns intended to defend the Old Mole firing out to ships 600–700 yards (550–640 m) away.

During the Great Siege of Gibraltar, the bastion was redesigned and enlarged to become a demi-bastion featuring a retired flank behind an orillon with parapets 12 feet (3.7 m) thick

In the 1790s, Sir William Green oversaw improvements to Gibraltar's defences and had the Orange and the Montagu Bastions extended and also arranged for a counterguard to be constructed in front of them as additional defences. This 1823 counterguard which was originally named "Orange Counterguard" was later renamed to Chatham Counterguard after the Earl Of Chatham who was the Governor of Gibraltar from 1821. The counterguard protected the bastion as the enemy would have to capture the counterguard before taking on the bastion; and whilst attempting this the enemy would come under the direct fire of the bastion. A third layer of protection was added by constructing a breakwater in front of the counterguard to deter amphibious assaults.

By 1834 there were eleven guns and later two larger rifled muzzle loading (RML) guns were installed. Alterations completed in 1877 on the face of the bastion, allowed for the mounting of two RML 10 inch 18 ton gun behind iron shields known as Gibraltar Shields.

During World War II a Bofors 40 mm gun was installed at Orange Bastion.

Between 2006 and 2008 the bastion was subject to major restoration work as part of the Government of Gibraltar's city walls walk scheme As part of the restoration works, two Victorian RML guns from the nearby King's Bastion were relocated here.

The curtain between Montagu and the Chatham Counterguard was breached to allow access for new apartments. A relatively modern commercial building now sits on top of the walls of the counterguard.
