= Europort Avenue =

Road in Gibraltar

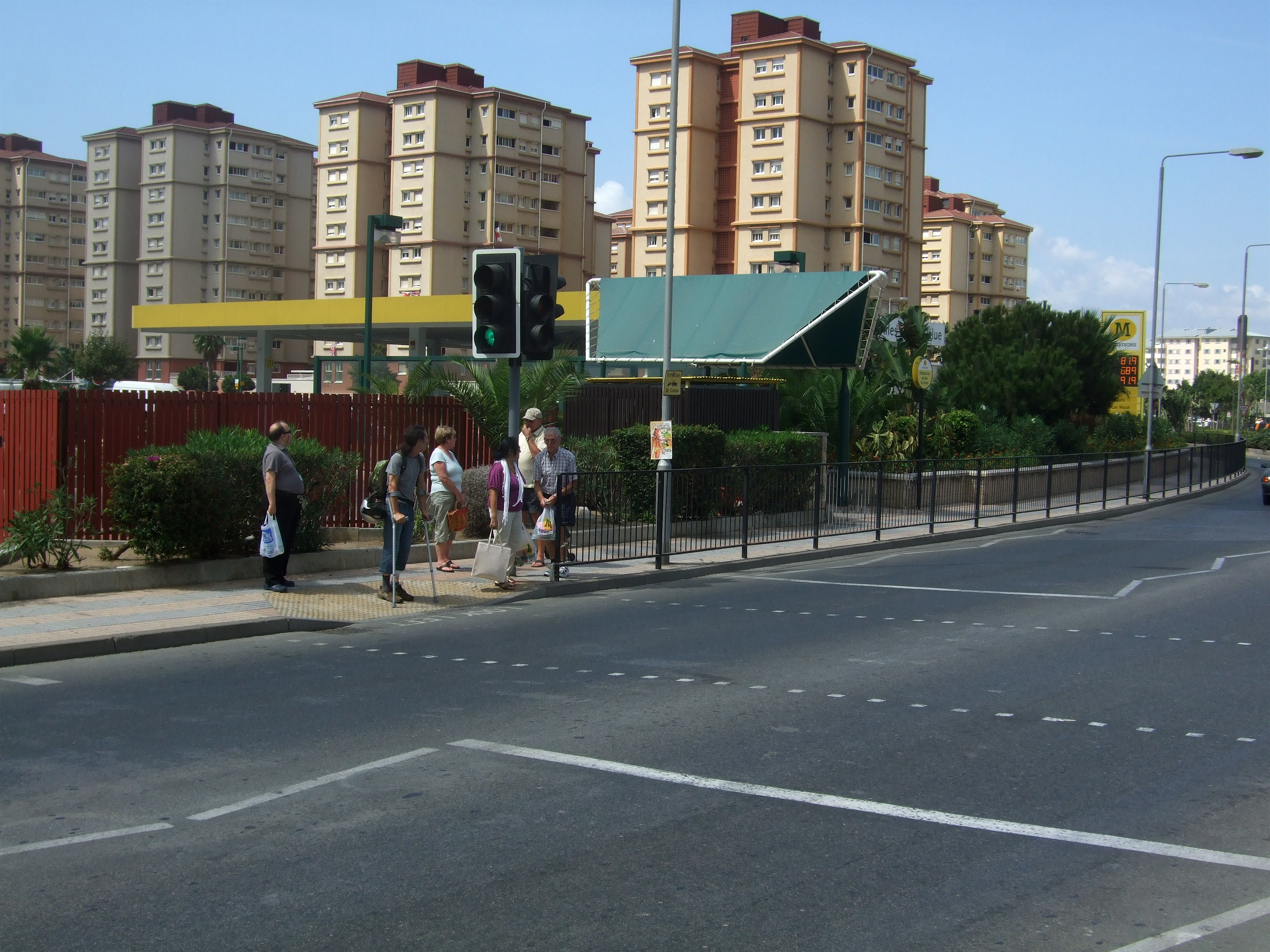
The avenue in 2009

Europort Avenue is an avenue in the British Overseas Territory of Gibraltar. It is built on reclaimed land and buildings include McDonald's fast food, Morrisons supermarket and St Bernard's Hospital. At one end is a roundabout that features a sculpture by Jill Cowie Sanders of a larger than lifesize family being reunited. It was unveiled in 2000 to commemorate the sacrifice made by the people of Gibraltar when they were evacuated during the Second World War.

== See also ==
- Calpe Rowing Club
- Mediterranean Rowing Club
