= Line Wall Road =

Road in Gibraltar

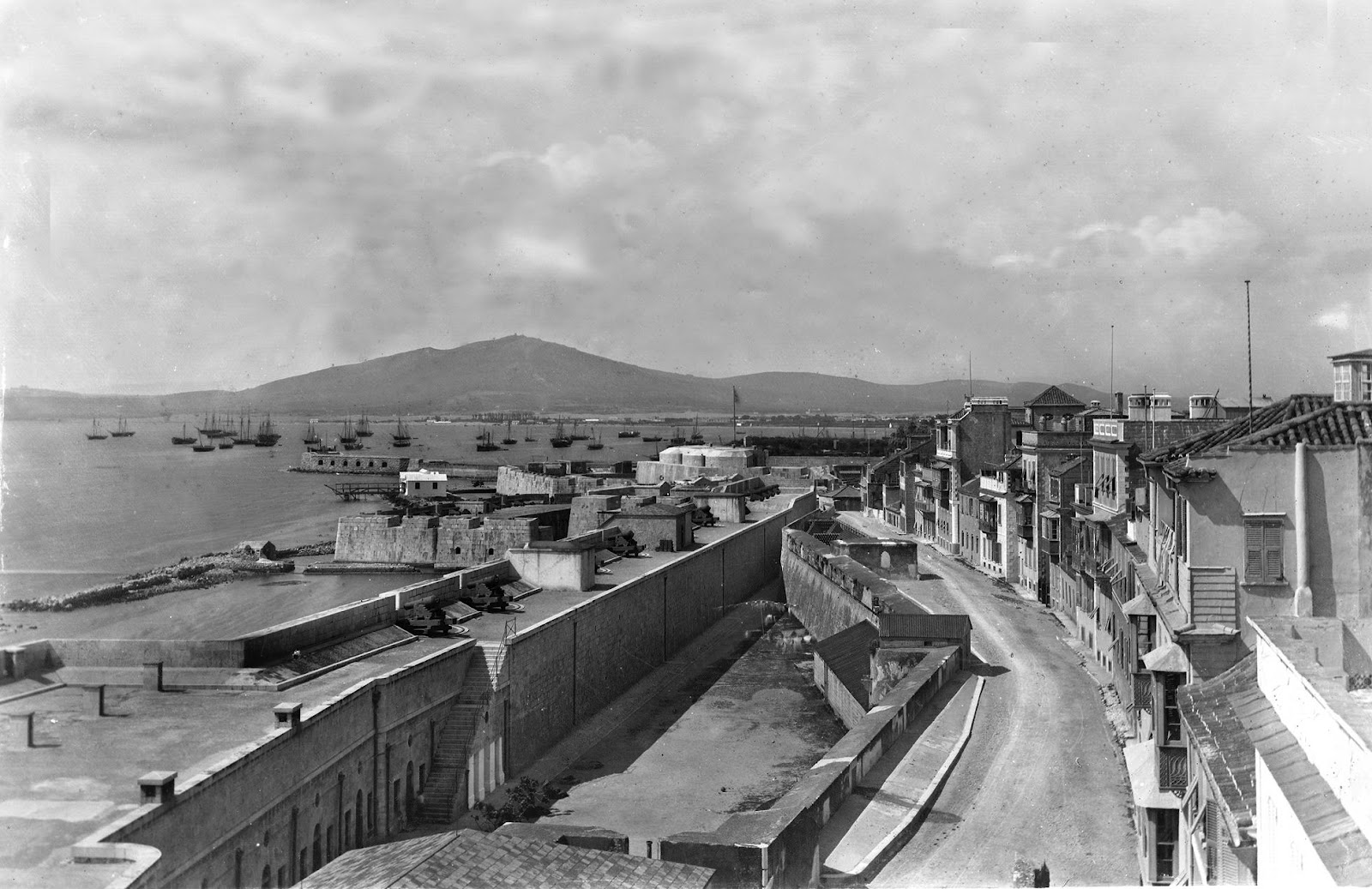
Line Wall Road in the 1890s

Line Wall Road is a road in the British Overseas Territory of Gibraltar. It is one of the main roads leading into the city centre. It runs immediately east of the Line Wall Curtain in a north–south direction, connecting Smith Dorrien Avenue near Grand Casemates Square with the southern end of Main Street at Southport Gates. It runs parallel with Queensway through much of its length at an elevated level. Part of the western defensive wall has been excavated along Line Wall Road.
