= Frederick Leeds Edridge =

English artist

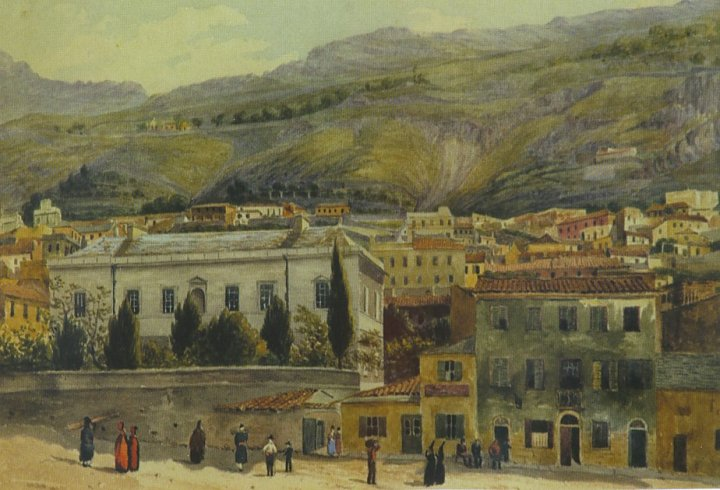
"Old Garrison library"

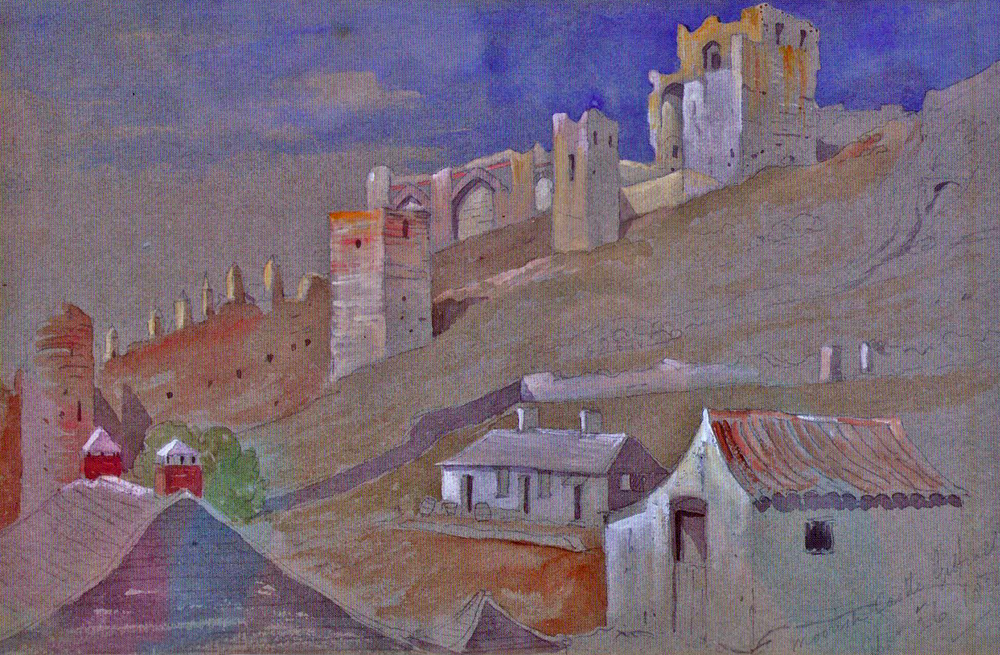
"Moorish Castle"

Frederick Leeds Edridge (1800 – 3 April 1841 in Woolwich) was a lieutenant in the Royal Artillery and an amateur artist.

Edridge was at the Battle of Waterloo in 1815, receiving the Waterloo Medal for his service. In 1820, he joined the Royal Artillery, and was stationed with the Sixth Battalion at Gibraltar between 1830 and 1834. The garrison stationed there consisted of officers mainly interested in hunting, shooting and fishing. During this stay he painted a series of watercolours, which document this period in Gibraltar's history and are mostly now housed at the Gibraltar Museum.

Edridge died in Woolwich at the age of 41.
