= King's Bastion =

18C fortifications in Gibraltar

- Part of Fortifications of Gibraltar
- Line Wall, Gibraltar
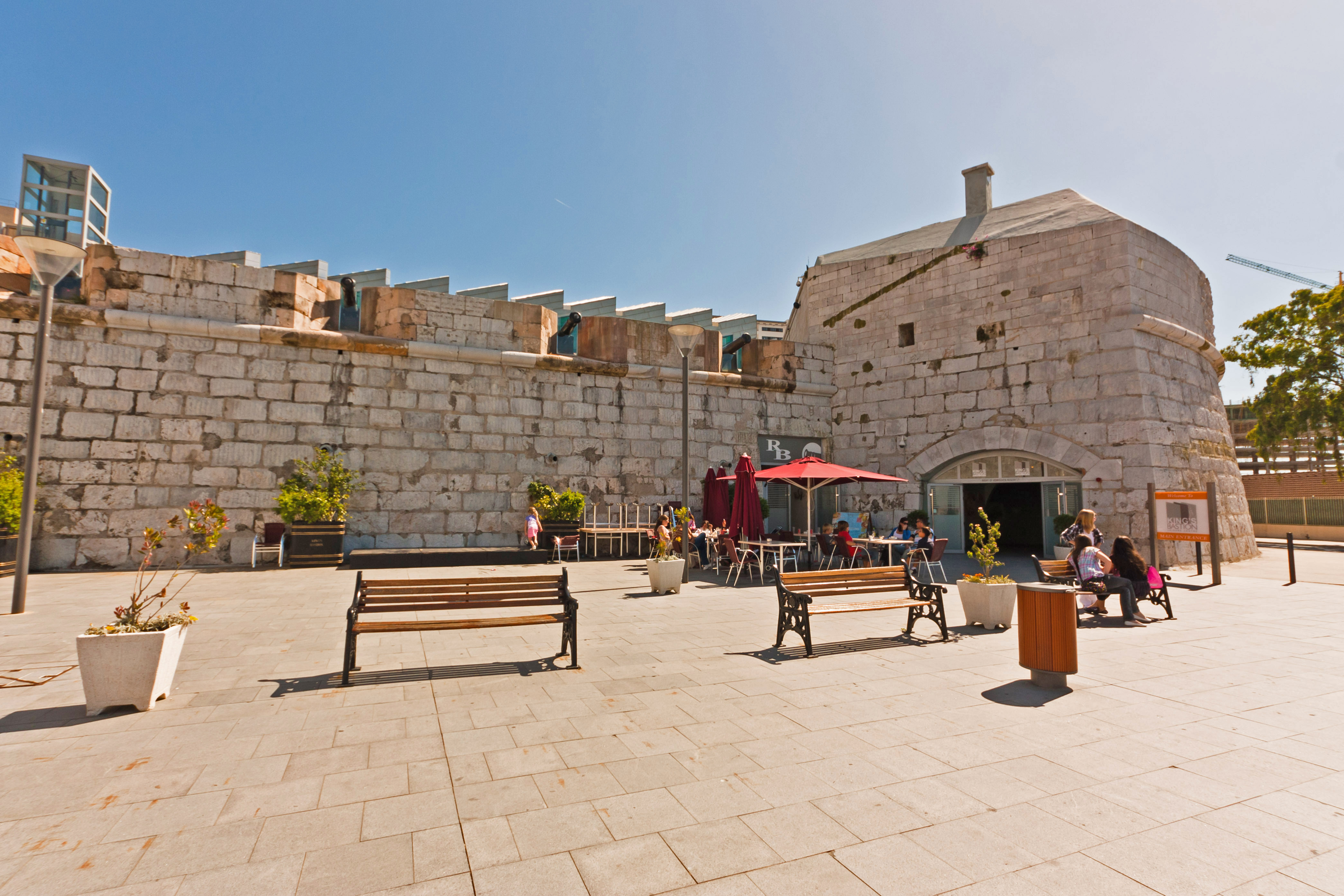
- King's Bastion, Gibraltar

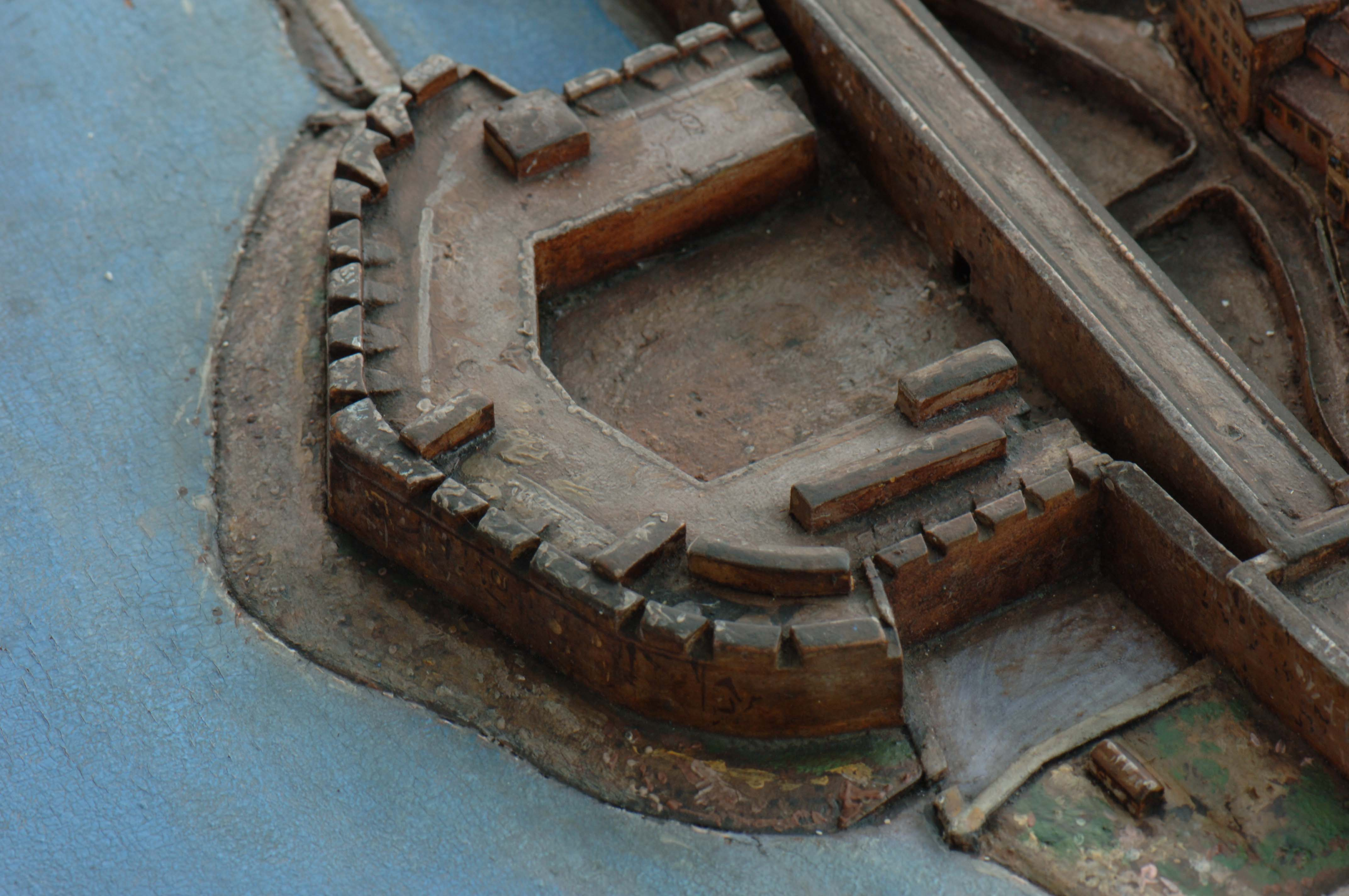
- King's Bastion as depicted on the 1865 scale model of Gibraltar.

Site information
- Type: Coastal battery
- Owner: Government of Gibraltar
- Controlled by: Gibraltar
- Open to the public: Yes
- Condition: Good
- Website: www.kingsbastion.gov.gi

Location
- Location of King's Bastion within Gibraltar.
- Coordinates: 36.139701°N 5.355099°W

Site history
- Built: 1773
- Built by: British Government
- In use: 1773–present
- Materials: Limestone
- Battles/wars: Great Siege of Gibraltar

Garrison information
- Past commanders: Robert Boyd; George Augustus Eliott

King's Bastion is a coastal bastion on the western front of the fortifications of the British overseas territory of Gibraltar, protruding from the Line Wall Curtain. It is located between Line Wall Road and Queensway and overlooks the Bay of Gibraltar . It played a crucial role in defending The Rock during the Great Siege of Gibraltar. In more recent history the bastion was converted into a generating station which powered Gibraltar's electricity needs. Today it continues to serve the community as Gibraltar's leisure centre.

== Design and early history ==
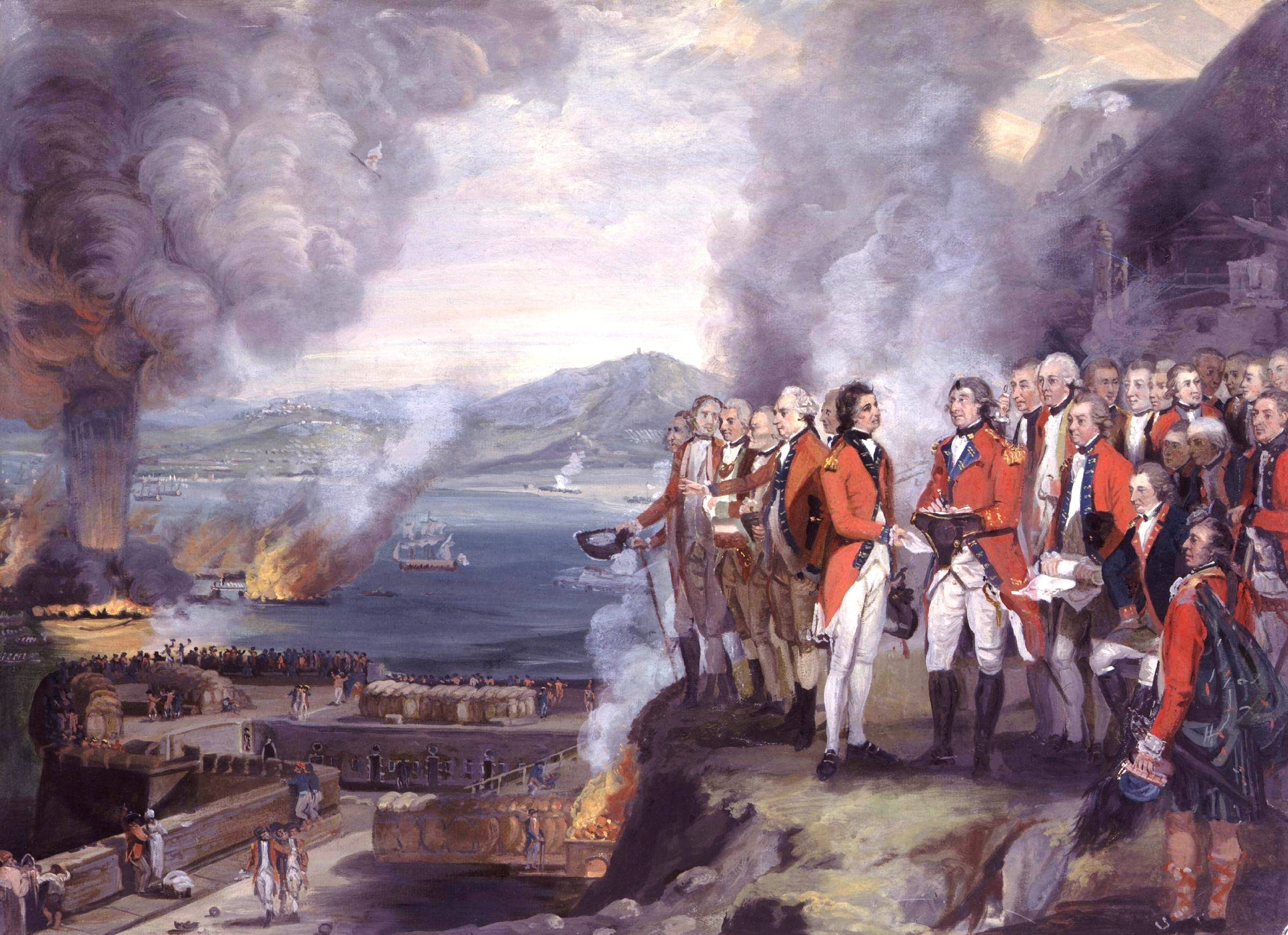
The Siege of Gibraltar, 1782 by George Carter depicts the crucial role King's Bastion played in defending The Rock during the Great Siege of Gibraltar.

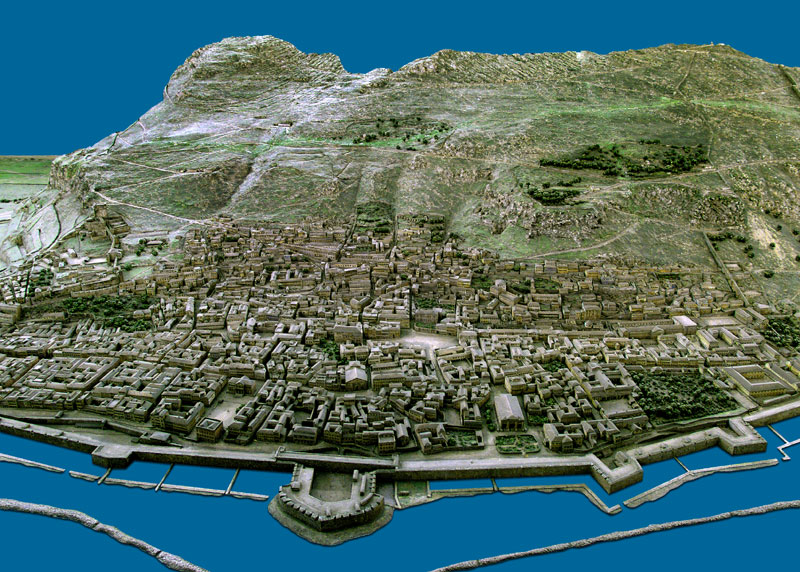
Centre portion of the scale model of Gibraltar, completed in 1865, with King's Bastion depicted in bottom centre.

King's Bastion is located at the junction of Queensway and Reclamation Road on the western side of the British overseas territory of Gibraltar. The bastion is believed to have started as a Moorish city gate but was later developed by the Spanish in 1575 to become the Spanish: Plataforma de San Lorenzo. Construction began in 1773, when Lieutenant-general Sir Robert Boyd (1710–1794), then Governor of Gibraltar, laid the first stone and declared: "This is the first stone of a work which I name the King's Bastion: may it be as gallantly defended, as I know it will be ably executed." The bastion was designed by Lieutenant colonel Sir William Green, Chief Engineer of the Soldier Artificer Company which later became the Corps. of Royal Engineers. At the time it was built, the King's Bastion was the most important of Gibraltar's defences on the west. Its arrowhead shape extended from the curtain wall fortification, known as the Line Wall, along Gibraltar's western coast into the Bay of Gibraltar. It was consistent with traditional notions of a bastion. It included casemates, which fulfilled the need for barracks, and housed 800 men. Less than a decade later, in 1782, King's Bastion served ably as the command post in the defence against the attacks of the French and Spanish during the Great Siege of Gibraltar. It was from the bastion, that the "Grand Attack" of the Spanish floating batteries was orchestrated. The floating batteries had been adapted to withstand heavy shelling and were anchored only 500 metres (550 yd) or so off the Rock. Designed by French engineer Jean Claude le Michaud d'Arcon they were equipped with specially reinforced hulls, irrigation pumps to quench any fires and pitched roofs to protect against plunging fire from shot. These modifications were thought to have made the ships unsinkable. The garrison quickly realised that red hot shots known as "hot potatoes", were extremely effective against the floating batteries and they were all eventually destroyed by fire. It was from King's Bastion that the first "hot potatoes" were fired at the Spanish floating batteries.

Twenty-five guns had been installed in the bastion by 1859. They included seventeen 32-pounders, six 8-inch smoothbore weapons, and two 10-inch howitzers. In 1874, the embrasures at the front of the bastion were eliminated to permit installation of five muzzle-loading rifles (RMLs). All five RMLs had been mounted by 1878, where they remained until 1902. By the late 19th century, the bastion no longer served as a principal military defence. The turn of the century was remarkable for the reclamation of land in front of King's Bastion, as part of the new dockyard. The bastion was repurposed, and the casemates, no longer needed as barracks, housed coal stores. In addition, the area's first electricity-generating station was built there, with construction starting in 1896.

A plaque (pictured below) installed on the northern façade of King's Bastion acknowledges the role of General George Augustus Eliott, 1st Baron Heathfield, the Governor of Gibraltar, in his command during the Great Siege. In addition, Major General Sir Robert Boyd was at his request interred inside a vault at the bastion's base, which he had included at the time of construction. However, there is no record of the exact location of the grave. A memorial stone was placed within the King's Chapel but the marble stone in the King's Bastion read:

"Within the walls of this bastion are deposited the mortal remains of the late General Sir Robert Boyd, K.B., governor of this fortress, who died on 13 May 1794, aged 84 years. By him the first stone of the bastion was laid in 1773, and under his supervision it was completed, when, on that occasion, in his address to the troops, he expressed a wish to see it resist the combined efforts of France and Spain, which wish was accomplished on 13 Sept. 1782, when, by the fire of this bastion, the flotilla expressly designed for the capture of this fortress were utterly destroyed."

== 20th century ==
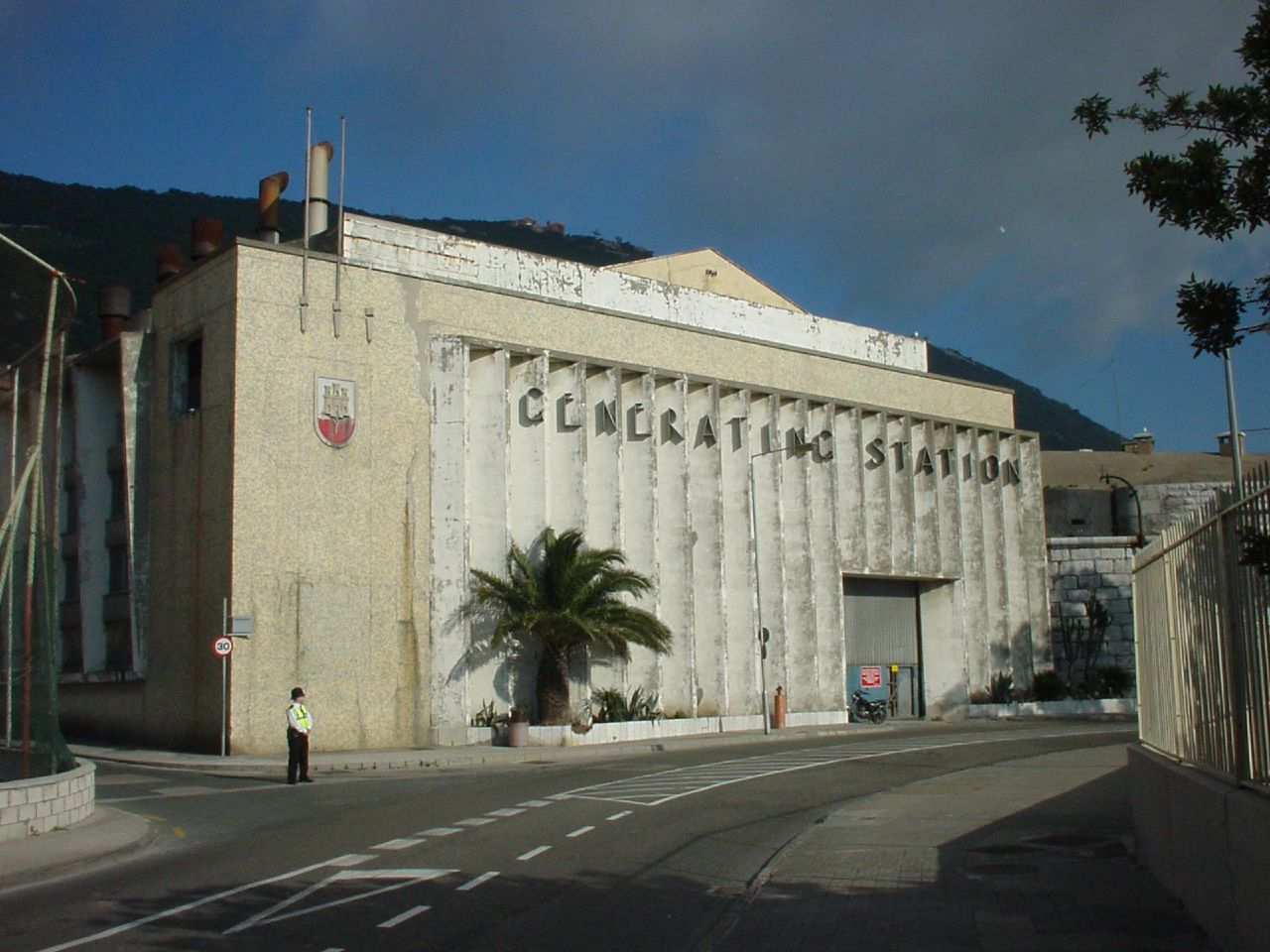
The generating station adjacent to the bastion in 2002, three years prior to its demolition.

The bastion underwent further modifications in the 20th century. Concrete bunkers were constructed and the structure became a lookout post. In addition, a 6 pounder anti-tank gun was mounted. After the 20th century wars, the bastion also became a saluting battery, employing four 25 pounders. The bastion's years as a military structure came to an end in 1961, when the King's Bastion Power Station, designed by local architect Natalio Langdon was built adjacent to the bastion's northern façade and opened in October of that year. While the previous electricity-generating station was under military authority, the King's Bastion Power Station was under the civil authority of the Government of Gibraltar. Oil storage and administration offices, among other facilities required for the day-to-day running of the station were housed within the vaults of the bastion itself. However, the generating station became obsolete during the late 1980s and closed down during the early 1990s. Through the old electrical conduit tunnels you can access the old measurement facility (BFAM) that’s located under Line wall Road.

== King's Bastion Leisure Centre ==
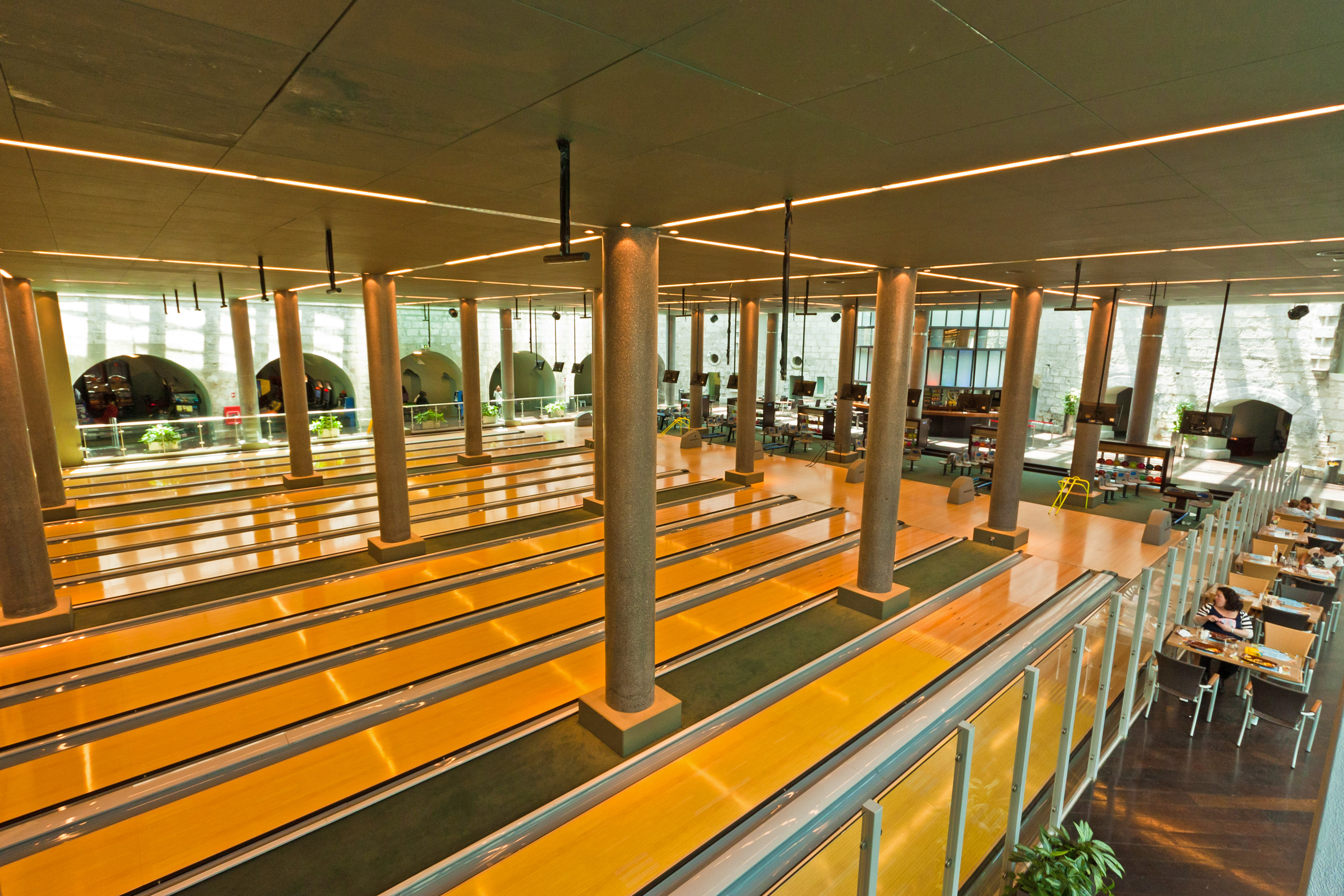
King's Bowl bowling alley in King's Bastion leisure centre.

The King's Bastion Power Station was demolished in October 2005, during which the original façade of the bastion was revealed. King's Bastion is listed with the Gibraltar Heritage Trust. Alexis Almeida, Chairman of the Trust indicated that the bastion was "the last major battery built in this style and so is very important. We would love to restore King's Bastion to its former glory, it is magnificent and deserves to be seen." After extensive refurbishment, the King's Bastion Leisure Centre opened on 28 February 2008. It was officially inaugurated as a leisure centre on 1 March 2008 by the then Chief Minister of Gibraltar, Peter Caruana. Facilities include, ice skating, cinemas, bowling, arcade games, fitness gym, al fresco dining, youth lounge, internet area and a nightclub.

Following the demolition of the adjacent modern building which housed part of the generating station, the bastion was redeveloped for leisure activities while still maintaining the integrity of the bastion architecture as an important heritage site. The ice skating rink and cinema are housed on the upper level. The new building has not compromised the structure of the bastion, as the main part of the leisure centre sits within the bastion's courtyard and is only lightly tied to the walls of the historic building. Old maps, photographs and diagrams on the history of the bastion are on display at various locations within the centre.

== Gallery ==
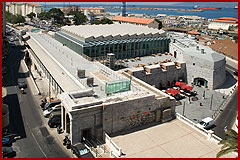
Aerial view of King's Bastion Leisure Centre.

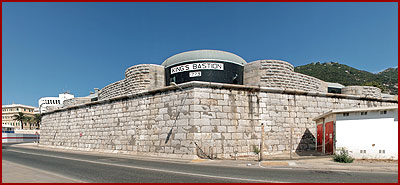
Wide angle view of the western façade of the King's Bastion Leisure Centre.

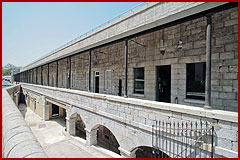
Barracks at King's Bastion.

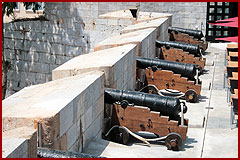
Cannon on south facing left flank of the King's Bastion Leisure Centre.

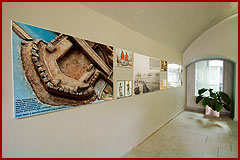
Historical displays inside King's Bastion Leisure Centre.

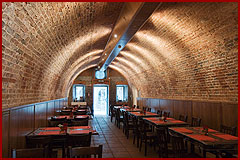
Restaurant in casemates at King's Bastion Leisure Centre.

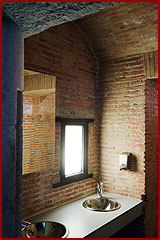
Wash room inside King's Bastion Leisure Centre.

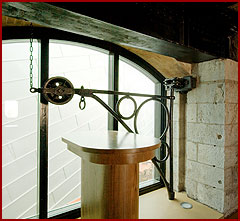
Original hoist inside King's Bastion Leisure Centre.

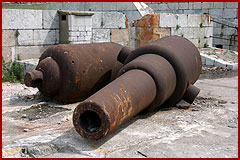
Refurbishment of an RML 10-inch 18 ton gun at King's Bastion.

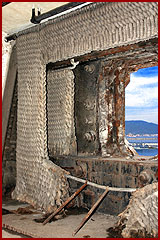
Rope mantlets at King's Bastion.

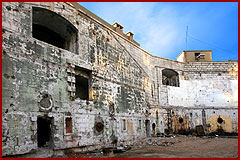
Refurbishment of the courtyard at King's Bastion.

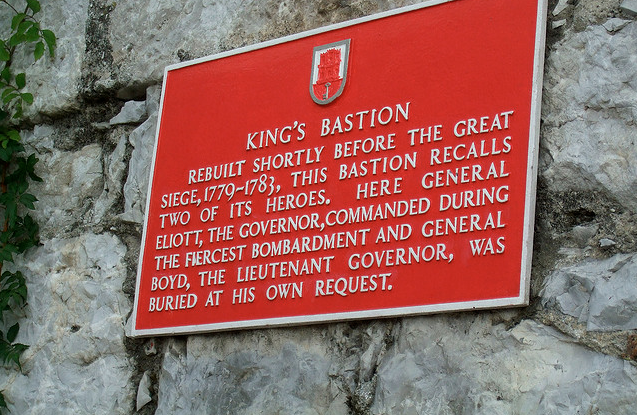
Plaque on King's Bastion northern façade.
