= Sir William Green, 1st Baronet =

British army officer

General Sir William Green Bt FRS
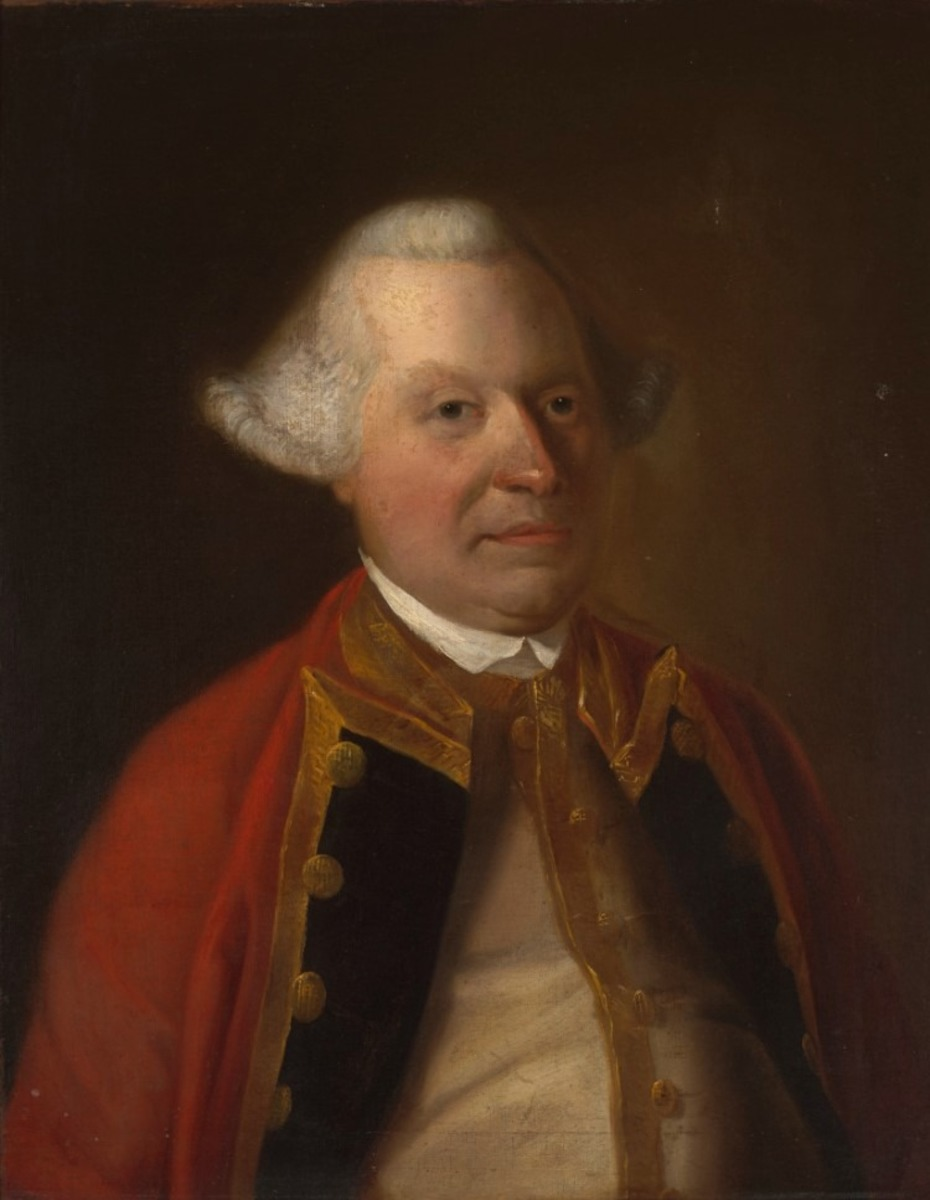
- Born: 4 April 1725
- Died: 10 January 1811 (aged 85); Bifrons, near Canterbury, Kent, England
- Burial place: Plumstead, Kent, England
- Relatives: Adam Smith (uncle)
- Military career
- Allegiance: United Kingdom
- Branch: British Army
- Service years: 1737–1811
- Rank: General
- Unit: Royal Engineers
- Commands: Chief Engineer of Gibraltar
- Conflicts: War of the Austrian Succession; Battle of Fontenoy; Battle of Val; Siege of Bergen op Zoom; Seven Years' War; Battle of Beauport; Battle of the Plains of Abraham; American Revolutionary War; Great Siege of Gibraltar

General Sir William Green, 1st Baronet, FRS (4 April 1725 – 10 January 1811) was a British Army officer, of Marass, Kent. He served as chief engineer at the Great Siege of Gibraltar.

After receiving a private education in Aberdeen, Scotland and a military education at the Royal Military Academy in Woolwich, England, he was appointed as a practitioner engineer in 1743. Green served on the European continent until 1752, after which he was in Canada. There, he continued to advance through both the ordinary military and engineering ranks.

Following his return to England, Green was named senior engineer for Gibraltar about 1761, and the next year promoted to lieutenant colonel. He was promoted to chief engineer for Gibraltar in 1770, and designed and executed a number of military works on the Rock. In 1772, his idea of a regiment of military artificers, to replace the civilian mechanics who had formerly constructed military works, came to fruition in the form of the Soldier Artificer Company, the predecessor of the Corps of Royal Sappers and Miners. Their works included the King's Bastion, which Green designed. Promoted to colonel in 1777, he served as chief engineer throughout the Great Siege of Gibraltar (1779–1783). During the siege, he was promoted to brigadier general, then major general. He returned to England in 1783; three years later a baronetcy was created for him. He was appointed chief engineer of Great Britain in 1786. His promotions included that to lieutenant general in 1793 and full general in 1798. Following his retirement in 1802, he settled in Plumstead, Kent.

== Family ==
William Green was born on 4 April 1725, the eldest son of Fairbridge Green and his wife Helen Smith. His father's name has also been given as Godfrey Green. His mother was the sister of Adam Smith (1723–1790), author of The Theory of Moral Sentiments and An Inquiry into the Nature and Causes of the Wealth of Nations. Green received his education from his mother's sisters at Aberdeen, Scotland. He married Miriam Watson, daughter of Lieutenant Colonel Justly Watson of the Royal Engineers, on 26 February 1754. His wife was also the granddaughter of Colonel Jonas Watson (1663–1741), who led the Royal Artillery at the Siege of Carthagena, where he died. Green's children with Miriam Watson included a son, Justly Watson Green. His son, an officer who attained the rank of colonel, attended Prince Edward, later the Duke of Kent, in his travels, and died unmarried, without issue. Green and his wife had six other children, including: William Smith Green, who died as a young child; Miriam Green, who married and had seven children; Helen Mary Green, who married and had three children; Susannah Green; Louisa Anne Green; and Charlotte Green.

== Military career ==
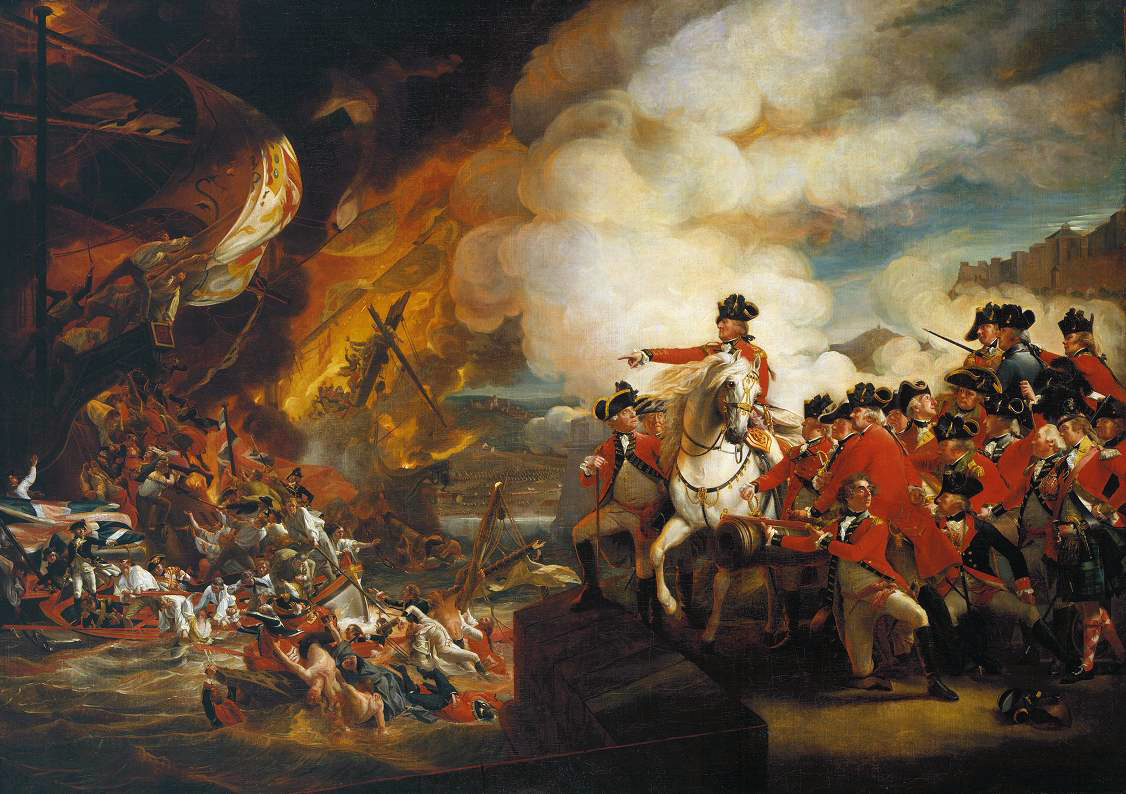
The Defeat of the Floating Batteries at Gibraltar, September 1782, by John Singleton Copley

On 1 January 1737, Green became a cadet gunner, entering the Royal Military Academy at the Woolwich Warren in Woolwich, southeast London. After his appointment as a practitioner engineer on 12 March 1743, Green was stationed at Portsmouth. He served in Flanders with the engineer brigade and was a participant in the Battle of Fontenoy in 1745. The following year, he saw action in France at L'Orient and Quiberon. Green was promoted to sub-engineer on 2 January 1747. That year, he sustained wounds and was taken prisoner at the Battle of Val. He also saw action at the Siege of Bergen-op-Zoom. Green was appointed engineer-extraordinary on 2 January 1748. After the British Army withdrew from Flanders, he and other engineers stayed to survey the Austrian Netherlands. After he left the Netherlands, he returned to Portsmouth, where he remained until 1750. He then went to Landguard Fort, under the command of Justly Watson. Plans that he and another officer drew up of the tunnels and caves of the fortress of Luxemburg, and of the area between Bois-le-Duc and Geertruidenberg, are held by the British Museum. That museum also retains his plans of the fortress of Bergen-op-Zoom, dated 1751.

Green surveyed and reported on the defences of Newfoundland in 1752. Three years later, he became chief engineer of Newfoundland. When the engineers first received routine military titles, he was commissioned as captain lieutenant. In Halifax, Nova Scotia, he trained the soldiers in military engineering. On 4 January 1758, Green received promotions to engineer-in-ordinary and captain. He was a participant in multiple actions in Canada, including those at Montmorenci, Quebec, and the Plains of Abraham in 1759. In September of that year, he was promoted to sub-director, an engineer rank, and major. He remained with the Canadian campaign until its conclusion, after which he returned to England.

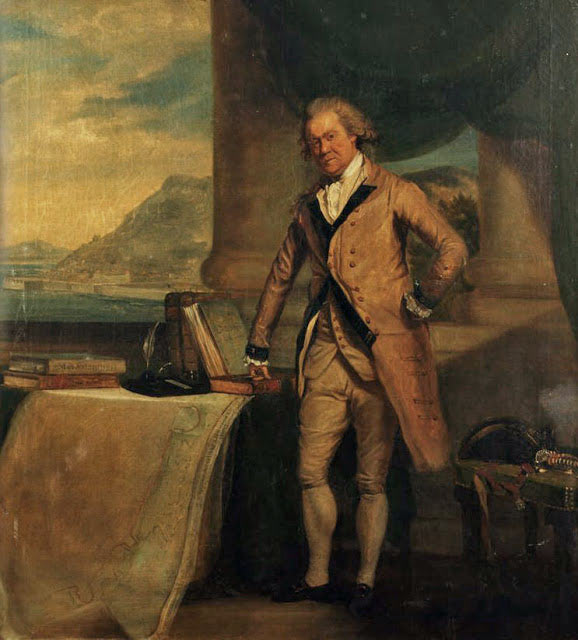
William Green, Chief Engineer of Gibraltar; by George Carter

In 1761, Green was sent to Gibraltar as senior engineer. The following year, he was promoted to lieutenant colonel. Green returned to England in 1769 to present his suggestions for improving the defence of Gibraltar to the Board of Ordnance. He returned to Gibraltar in 1770; his report on the defences of Gibraltar is held by the British Museum. General Skinner, the chief engineer of Great Britain, supported the expenditures necessary for Green's military works, which were then undertaken. Green was promoted to chief engineer of Gibraltar on 7 November 1770 and the following year designed the hospital at Gibraltar.

Prior to 1772, military works in Gibraltar were constructed by civilians from England and the European continent. Those civil mechanics were free to leave the Rock of Gibraltar whenever they decided to do so. Their disorderly behaviour was a source of frustration to the military authorities. The situation induced Lieutenant Colonel William Green to suggest the creation of a company of military artificers, a regiment of trained artisans. On 6 March 1772, a warrant was issued for the creation of a 68-man regiment, the Soldier Artificer Company. It was the predecessor of the Corps of Royal Sappers and Miners. The Soldier Artificer Company built King's Bastion. Green designed the fortification, along with other eighteenth century bastions along the coast.

In 1777, Green was promoted to colonel, after which he was sent by Governor George Augustus Eliott to England to request additional funds to further improve the military works at Gibraltar. His meetings included several with the king and he returned to Gibraltar the following year, authorised to proceed with the new works. He was promoted to director, an engineer rank, on 18 December 1778. During the Great Siege of Gibraltar (1779–1783), Green served in a prominent role as the chief engineer of Gibraltar. In 1781, during the siege, he was promoted to brigadier general. However, the position of his home left his family exposed to enemy fire. After he moved his family into a shelter, his wife Miriam contracted an illness from which she never recovered. She died on 21 June 1782.

On 18 July 1781, the Queen's Battery at Willis's Plateau sustained severe damage from enemy fire. Overnight, Green had it completely rebuilt. In late 1781, he was promoted to major general. The following year, he constructed the Great Siege Tunnels, including St. George's Hall. On 13 September 1782, with Gibraltar under attack from both land and naval forces, his kilns maintained a continuous supply of red hot shot. Green rebuilt the Orange Bastion while under persistent attack. The siege ended in February 1783. He left for England in June of that year, after serving in Gibraltar for twenty-two years, most of it as chief engineer, including throughout the Great Siege.

A baronetcy was created for Green in June 1786, with his seat at Marass, Kent. He was appointed chief engineer of Great Britain in November of that year. He was also named as a board member on the fortifications of Plymouth and Portsmouth. Green became president of the defence committee in 1788. In 1793, he was promoted to lieutenant general, followed by his promotion to full general on 1 January 1798. Green retired on a pension in 1802, and resided at Brambleberry House, Plumstead, Kent. He was elected a Fellow of the Royal Society in 1790.

== Legacy ==
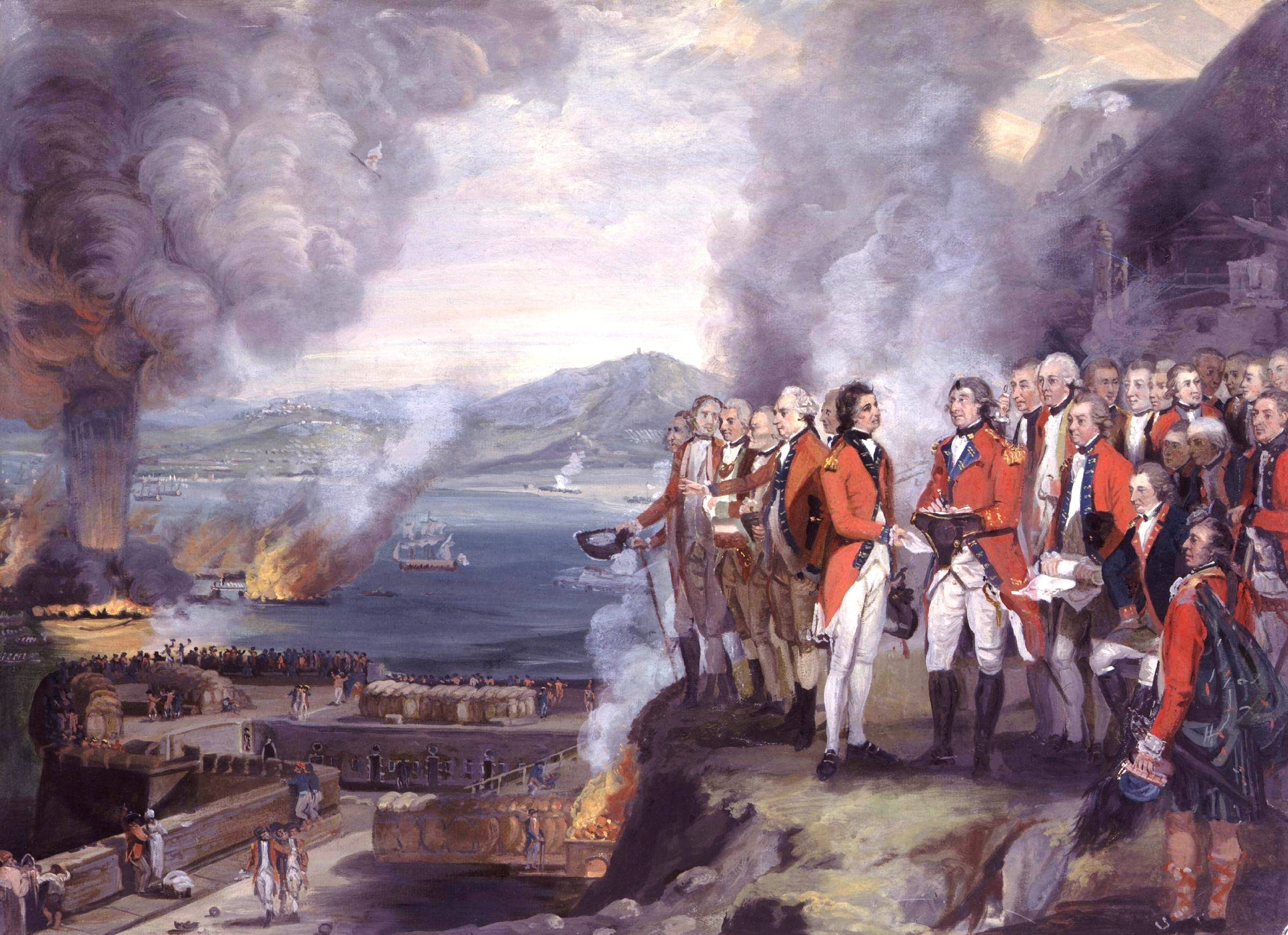
The Siege of Gibraltar, 1782, by George Carter

General Sir William Green died on 10 January 1811 at Bifrons, near Canterbury, Kent, although his date of death has also been given as February 1811. He was interred at Plumstead. In addition to an inscribed gravestone in the cemetery, there is also a commemorative plaque to Green in Plumstead Church. His son, Colonel Sir Justly Watson Green, 2nd Baronet of Marass, Kent, succeeded to the baronetcy, became extinct upon his death.

Green is one of the officers depicted in The Defeat of the Floating Batteries at Gibraltar, September 1782 (pictured above) by John Singleton Copley (1738–1815). The painting shows Green in the group of officers around the mounted governor, with Green standing immediately next to Governor George Augustus Eliott.

He is also one of the officers depicted in the 1784 painting (pictured at right) by George Carter entitled The Siege of Gibraltar, 1782. The portrait is held by the National Portrait Gallery.

A portrait of Green, oil on canvas, that was executed circa 1785, is held by the Convent, the residence of the Governor of Gibraltar. Part of the Government Art Collection, it is entitled Major-General Sir William Green, Royal Engineers (Chief Engineer during the Siege of Gibraltar 1779–83).

Green's Lodge Battery was named after General Sir William Green, then Lieutenant Colonel Green. The artillery battery was constructed in 1776 at the North Face of the Rock of Gibraltar at the northern end of the Upper Rock Nature Reserve, above Farringdon's Battery. Also referred to as the Superior Battery, it saw action during the Great Siege of Gibraltar. The emplacement is listed with the Gibraltar Heritage Trust. In addition, Green's Lodge Nature Trail extends off Signal Station Road in northern Gibraltar.

Baronetage of Great Britain
New creation	Baronet (of Marass); 1786–1811	Succeeded by Justly Watson Green
