= Queensway, Gibraltar =

Coastal road in Gibraltar

Queensway
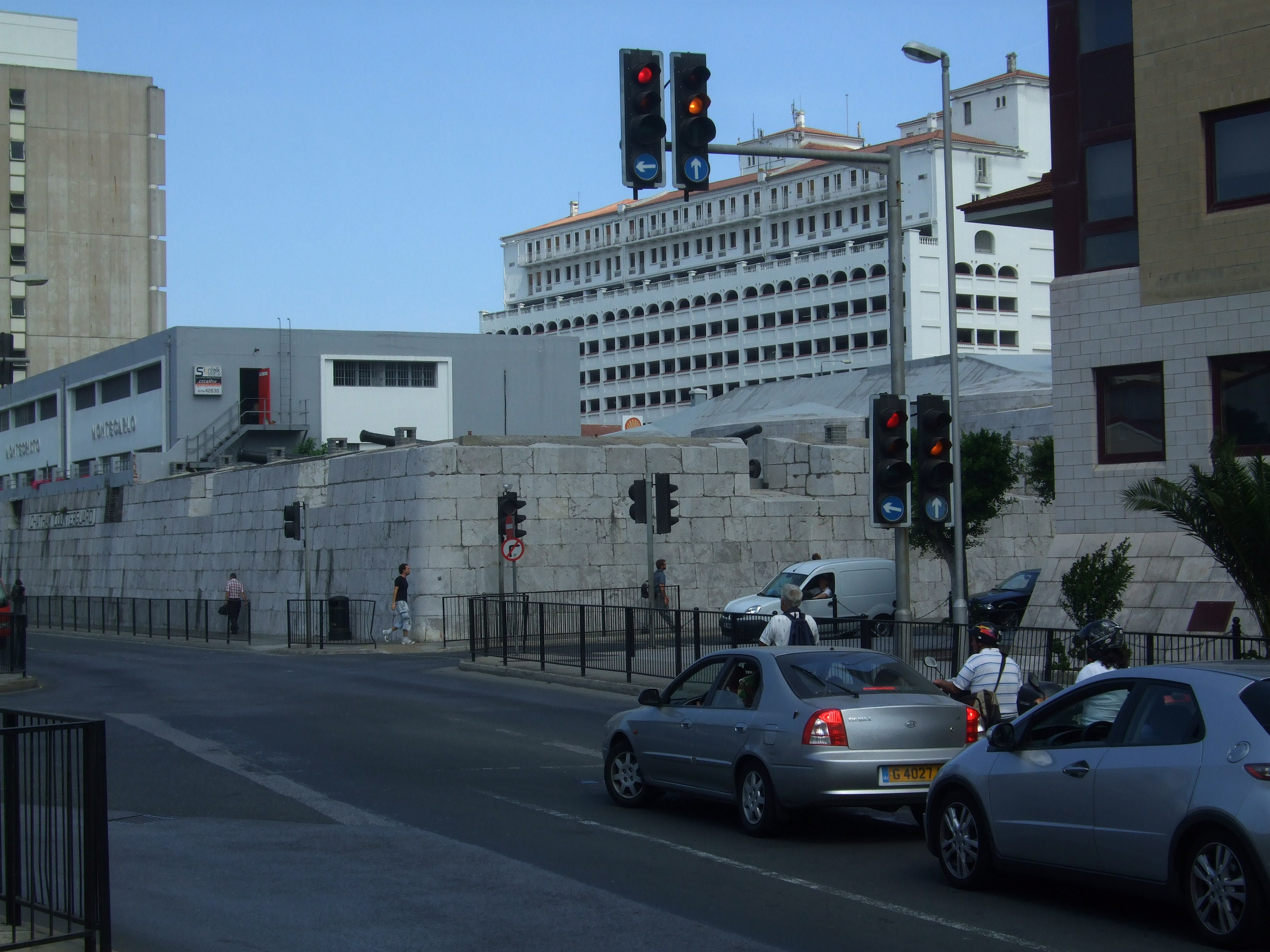
- Queensway at the junction with Europort Avenue and Reclamation Road.
- Length: 1.5 km (0.93 mi)
- Location: Gibraltar
- Coordinates: 36.140894°N 5.355926°W
- Northbound end: Glacis Road; Waterport Avenue
- Southbound end: Ragged Staff Road

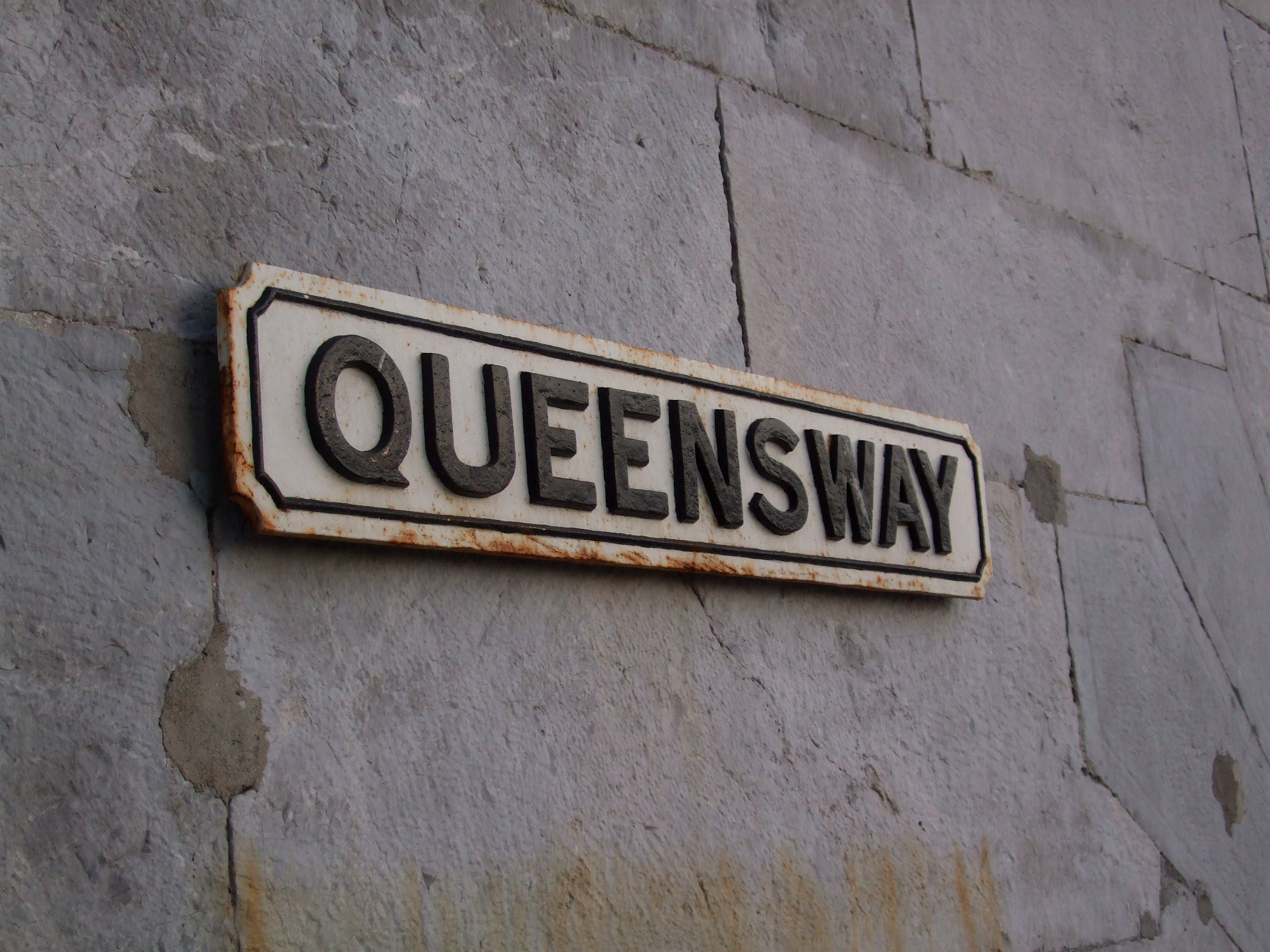
Traditional cast iron street sign on the fortification walls.

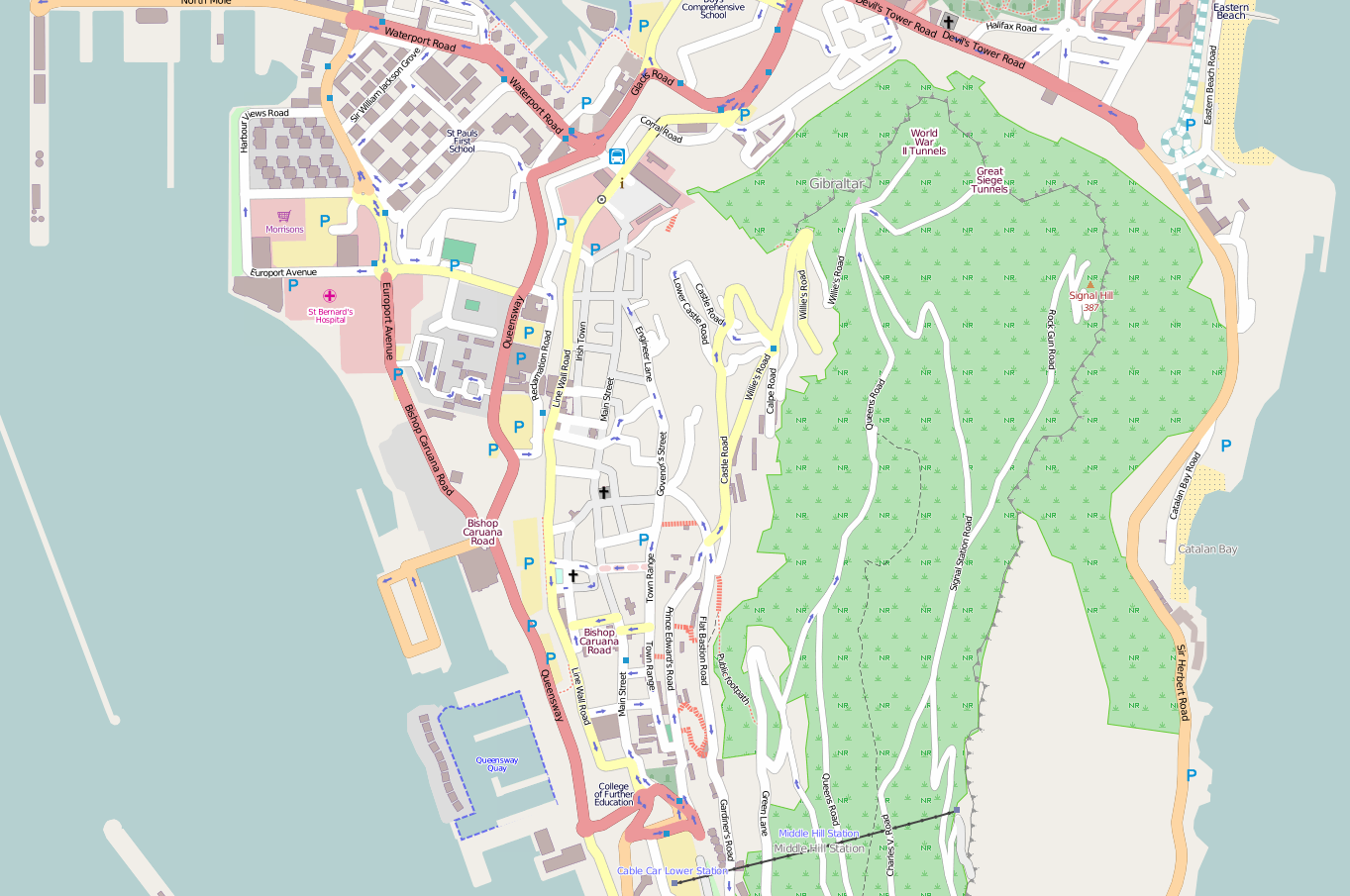
Map of the northern end of the city showing Queensway's route.

Queensway is a main coastal road in the British Overseas Territory of Gibraltar and the only road servicing the oldest leisure marina on The Rock, Queensway Quay. It connects the marina with the industrial park in the southern end of the Gibraltar Harbour.

== Description ==
Queensway is built on reclaimed land immediately to the west of Line Wall Curtain, Gibraltar's main city wall and runs along most of its length. It was renamed Queensway after a visit by Queen Elizabeth II in 1954. The road begins in northern Gibraltar at the roundabout with Glacis Road and Waterport Avenue. It begins to the southwest for about 100 metres (330 ft) before heading south-southwest. It passes Europort Avenue and Reclamation Road before passing running parallel to Gibraltar Harbour. Near the dockyard there is a roundabout at Ragged Staff Gates connecting it to Ragged Staff Road. Queensway comes to an end at this roundabout, although a road continues into the industrial park and dockyard.

== Economy ==
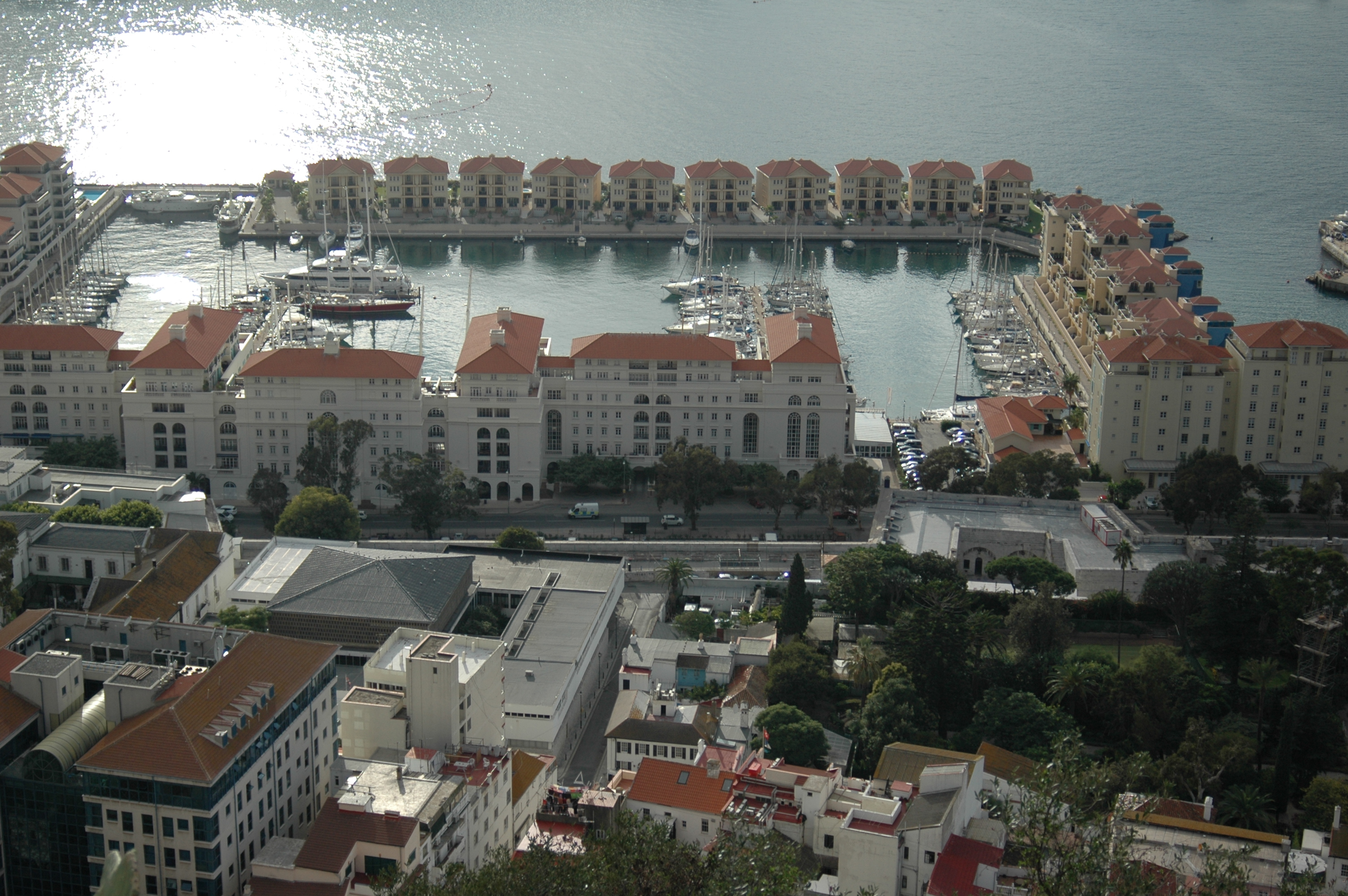
View of Queensway Quay from the Rock of Gibraltar showing Queensway in the centre of the photograph.

Queensway Quay located west of this road takes its name. In the early 1990s, Taylor Woodrow facilitated a £50 million development along Queensway, developing a hotel, apartments and marina complex at the quayside.
