= Shire =

Traditional British term for county

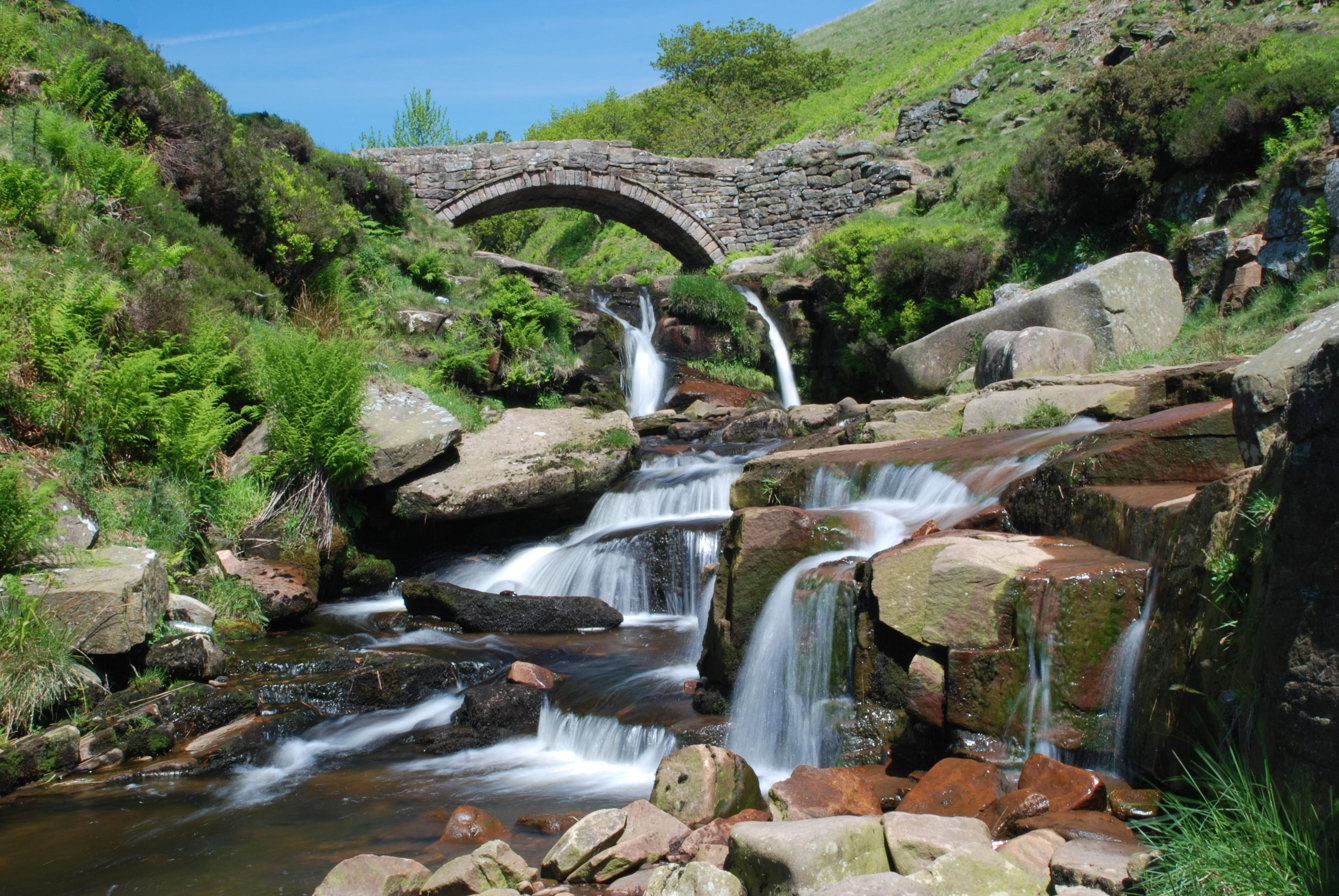
Three Shire Heads bridge, where three shires in England (Cheshire, Derbyshire and Staffordshire) meet

Shire (/ʃaɪər/) is a traditional term for an administrative division of land in Great Britain and some other English-speaking and Commonwealth countries. It is generally synonymous with county (such as Berkshire and Cheshire). English counties are among the oldest extant national divisions in the world.

It was first used in Wessex from the beginning of Anglo-Saxon settlement, and spread to most of the rest of England in the 10th century. Today, 23 counties bear the "-shire" suffix in England, 23 in Scotland, and 10 in Wales.

In some rural and regional parts of Australia, including parts of the state of Victoria, a shire is a local government area; however, in Australia, shire is not synonymous with "county", the latter term being used to describe a particular lands administrative division in some sparsely populated parts of Western Australia and the Northern Territory.

== Etymology ==
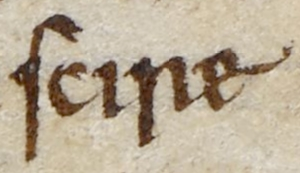
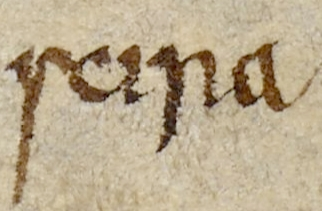
The Anglo-Saxon Chronicle mentions locations ending or beginning with 'scire' or 'scira'.

The word shire derives from the Old English sċir, from the Proto-Germanic *skizo (cf. Old High German: scira), denoting an 'official charge' a 'district under a governor', and a 'care'. In the UK, shire became synonymous with county, an administrative term introduced to England through the Norman Conquest in the later part of the eleventh century. In contemporary British usage, the word counties also refers to shires, mainly in places such as Shire Hall.

In regions with rhotic pronunciation, such as Scotland, the word shire is pronounced /ʃaɪər/; in areas of non-rhotic pronunciation, the final R is silent, unless the next word begins in a vowel sound. In England and Wales, when shire is a place-name suffix, the vowel is unstressed and usually shortened (monophthongized); the pronunciations include /ʃər/ and /ʃɪər/, with the final R pronunciation depending on rhoticity. The vowel is normally reduced to a single schwa, as in Leicestershire /ˈlɛs.tər.ʃər/ or /ˈlɛs.tər.ʃɪər/ and Berkshire /ˈbɑːrk.ʃər/ or /ˈbɑːrk.ʃɪər/.

== Origins ==
The system was first used in the kingdom of Wessex from the beginning of Anglo-Saxon settlement, and spread to most of the rest of England in the 10th century, along with the West Saxon kingdom's political domination. In Domesday (1086) the city of York was divided into shires. The first shires of Scotland were created in English-settled areas such as Lothian and the Borders, in the 9th century. King David I more consistently created shires and appointed sheriffs across lowland shores of Scotland.

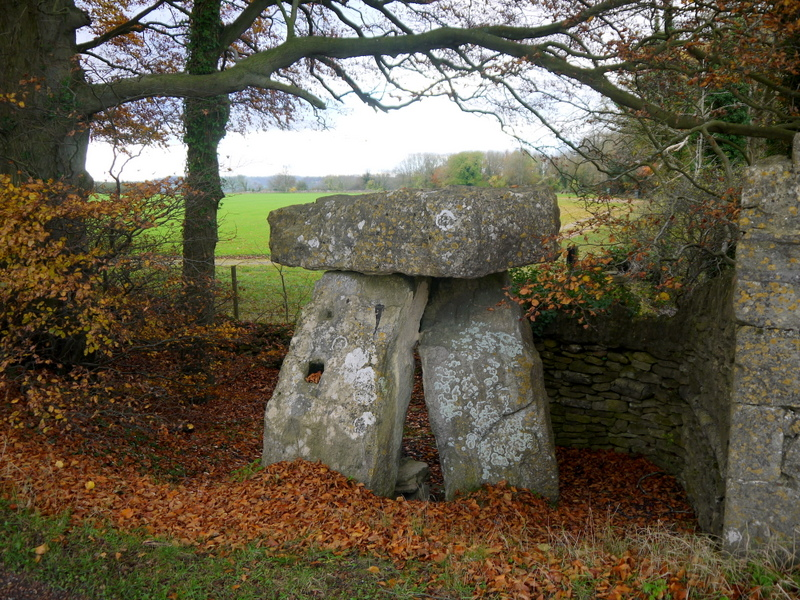
Three Shire Stones (with smaller interior engraved stones dated to 1736), in Batheaston, marking where the historic counties of Gloucestershire, Wiltshire and Somerset (then Somersetshire) meet

The shire in early days was governed by an ealdorman and in the later Anglo-Saxon period by a royal official known as a "shire reeve" or sheriff. The shires were divided into hundreds or wapentakes, although other less common sub-divisions existed. An alternative name for a shire was a "sheriffdom" until sheriff court reforms separated the two concepts. The phrase "shire county" applies, unofficially, to non-metropolitan counties in England, specifically those that are not local unitary authority areas. In Scotland the word "county" was not adopted for the shires. Although "county" appears in some texts, "shire" was the normal name until counties for statutory purposes were created in the 19th century. In Ireland "shire" was not used for the counties.

In most cases, the "shire town" is the seat of the shire's government, or was historically. Sometimes the nomenclature exists even where "county" is used in place of "shire" as in, for instance, Kentville in Nova Scotia.

== Shires in the United Kingdom ==
"Shire" also refers, in a narrower sense, to ancient counties with names that ended in "shire". These counties are typically (though not always) named after their county town. The suffix -shire is attached to most of the names of English, Scottish and Welsh counties. It tends not to be found in the names of shires that were pre-existing divisions. Essex, Kent, and Sussex, for example, have never borne a -shire, as each represents a former Anglo-Saxon kingdom. Similarly Cornwall was a Brittonic kingdom before it became an English county. The term "shire" is not used in the names of the six traditional counties of Northern Ireland.

=== Shire names in England ===
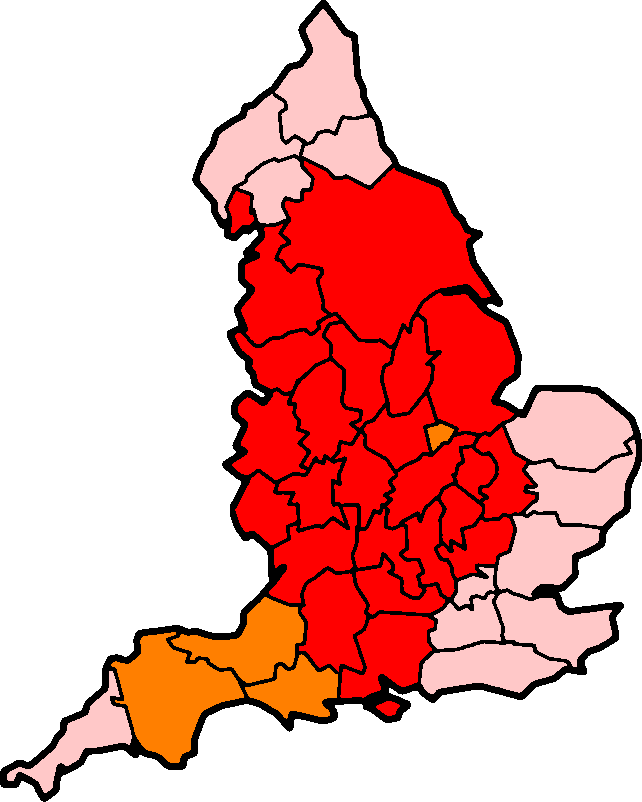
The historic counties of England – red indicates "-shire" counties, orange indicates where the "-shire" suffix is occasionally used

Counties in England bearing the "-shire" suffix are:

- Bedfordshire
- Berkshire
- Buckinghamshire
- Cambridgeshire
- Cheshire
- Derbyshire
- Gloucestershire
- Hampshire
- Herefordshire
- Hertfordshire
- Huntingdonshire
- Lancashire
- Lincolnshire
- Leicestershire
- Northamptonshire
- Nottinghamshire
- Oxfordshire
- Shropshire
- Staffordshire
- Warwickshire
- Wiltshire
- Worcestershire
- Yorkshire

These counties, on their historical boundaries, cover a little more than half the area of England. The counties that do not use "-shire" are mainly in three areas: in the south-east, south-west and far north of England. Several of these counties no longer exist as administrative units, or have had their administrative boundaries reduced by local government reforms. Several of the successor authorities retain the "-shire" county names, such as North Yorkshire, East Riding of Yorkshire, South Yorkshire, and West Yorkshire.

The county of Devon was historically known as Devonshire, although this is no longer the official name. Indeed, it was retained by the Devonshire and Dorset Regiment until amalgamation in 2007. Similarly, Dorset, Rutland and Somerset were formerly known as Dorsetshire, Rutlandshire and Somersetshire, but these terms are no longer official, and are rarely used outside the local populations.

Hexhamshire was a county in the north-east of England from the early 12th century until 1572, when it was incorporated into Northumberland.

=== Shire names in Scotland ===
Scotland was barely affected by the Norman conquest of England, and the word "shire" prevailed over "county" until the 19th century. Earliest sources have the same usage of the "-shire" suffix as in England (although in Scots this was most often schyr). Later, "Shire" appears as a separate word.

"Shire" names in Scotland are:

- Aberdeenshire
- Ayrshire
- Banffshire
- Berwickshire
- Clackmannanshire
- Cromartyshire
- Dumfriesshire
- Dunbartonshire
- Inverness-shire
- Kincardineshire
- Kinross-shire
- Kirkcudbrightshire
- Lanarkshire
- Morayshire
- Nairnshire
- Peeblesshire
- Perthshire
- Renfrewshire
- Ross-shire
- Roxburghshire
- Selkirkshire
- Stirlingshire
- Wigtownshire

In Scotland four shires have alternative names with the "-shire" suffix: Angus (Forfarshire), East Lothian (Haddingtonshire), Midlothian (Edinburghshire) and West Lothian (Linlithgowshire).

Sutherland is occasionally still referred to as Sutherlandshire. Similarly, "Argyllshire", "Buteshire", "Caithness-shire" and "Fifeshire" are sometimes found. Also, Moray was previously called "Elginshire". There is debate about whether "Argyllshire" was ever really used.

=== Shire names in Wales ===
Shires in Wales bearing the "-shire" suffix (Sir preceding the name in Welsh) are:

- Brecknockshire (or Breconshire)
- Caernarfonshire (historically Carnarvonshire)
- Cardiganshire (Welsh: Ceredigion)
- Carmarthenshire
- Denbighshire
- Flintshire
- Monmouthshire
- Montgomeryshire
- Pembrokeshire
- Radnorshire

The counties of Merioneth and Glamorgan are occasionally referred to with the "shire" suffix. The only traditional Welsh county that never takes "shire" in English is Anglesey; in Welsh it is called Sir Fôn.

=== Non-county "shires" ===
==== England ====
Historically, the suffix "-shire" could be a generalised term referring to a district. It did not acquire the strong association with county until later. Other than these, the term was used for several other districts. Bedlingtonshire, Craikshire, Norhamshire and Islandshire were exclaves of County Durham, and were incorporated into Northumberland or Yorkshire in 1844. The suffix was also used for many hundreds, wapentakes and liberties such as:

- Allertonshire
- Blackburnshire
- Halfshire
- Howdenshire
- Leylandshire
- Powdershire
- Pydarshire
- Richmondshire
- Riponshire
- Salfordshire
- Triggshire
- Tynemouthshire
- West Derbyshire
- Wivelshire

Also carrying the "-shire" suffix were counties corporate such as Hullshire, and other districts such as Applebyshire, Bamburghshire, Carlisleshire, Cravenshire, Hallamshire, and Mashamshire.

Richmondshire was, from 1974 to 2023, the name of a local government district of North Yorkshire.

==== Scotland ====
Non-county shires were very common in Scotland. Kinross-shire and Clackmannanshire are arguably survivals from such districts. Non-county "shires" in Scotland include Coldinghamshire and Yetholmshire.

=== "The Shires" ===
Colloquially, the term "the Shires" has become used to refer to those counties, particularly of the southern Midlands, which are still largely rural and which are stereotypically thought of as places where a more bucolic lifestyle is possible.

== Shires in the United States ==
=== New York and New England ===
Before the Province of New York was granted county subdivisions and a greater royal presence in 1683, the early ducal colony consisted of York Shire, as well as Albany and Ulster, after the three titles held by Prince James: Duke of York, Duke of Albany, Earl of Ulster.

The word also survives in the name of the state of New Hampshire, whose co-founder, John Mason, named his Province of New Hampshire after the English county of Hampshire.

Vermont has 14 counties, whose county seats are called shire towns. Bennington County is unique in having two shire towns, Bennington ("The Southshire") and Manchester ("The Northshire").

=== Virginia ===
In 1634, eight "shires" were created in the Virginia Colony by order of Charles I, King of England. They were renamed as counties only a few years later. They were:

- Accomac Shire (since 1642 Northampton County, Virginia)
- Charles City Shire (since 1637 Charles City County, Virginia)
- Charles River Shire (since 1643 York County, Virginia)
- Elizabeth City Shire (became Elizabeth City County, Virginia in 1643)
- Henrico Shire (later became Henrico County, Virginia)
- James City Shire (about 1642–43 James City County, Virginia)
- Warwick River Shire (became consolidated with the City of Newport News, Virginia)
- Warrosquyoake Shire (became Isle of Wight County, Virginia)

Today, the concept of a "Shire" still exists in Virginia code. It is defined as a semi-autonomous subdivision of a consolidated City-County. Currently no Shires exist in the commonwealth and the administrative provision is largely unknown.

== Shires in Australia ==
"Shire" is the most common word in Australia for rural local government areas (LGAs). New South Wales, the Northern Territory, Queensland, Victoria, and Western Australia, use the term "shire" for this unit; the territories of the Christmas Island and the Cocos (Keeling) Islands are also shires. In contrast, South Australia uses district and region for its rural LGA units, while Tasmania uses municipality. Shires are generally functionally indistinguishable from towns, boroughs, municipalities, or cities.

Three LGAs in outer metropolitan Sydney and four in outer metropolitan Melbourne have populations exceeding that of towns or municipalities, but retain significant bushlands and/or semi-rural areas, and most have continued to use "shire" in their titles whilst others have dropped it from theirs. These "city-shires" are:

Melbourne:

- Shire of Cardinia
- Shire of Mornington Peninsula (which is locally known as "The Peninsula")
- Shire of Nillumbik ("The Green Wedge Shire")
- Shire of Pakenham (1862–1994)
- Shire of Yarra Ranges

Sydney:

- Hornsby Shire ("The Bushland Shire")
- Sutherland Shire (which is locally referred to as "The Shire")
- The Hills Shire ("The Garden Shire", previously "Baulkham Hills Shire")

== In fiction ==
The Shire, homeland of the hobbits in J. R. R. Tolkien's works, where both The Hobbit and The Lord of the Rings begin and end, got its name from the English administrative land division.

== See also ==
- Comarca
- Comarcas of Spain
  - Comarques of Catalonia
- Counties of the United Kingdom
  - Counties of England
  - Historic counties of Wales
  - Shires of Scotland
- Gau
