= Tynedale =

Former local government district in England

Coordinates: 55.036°N 2.127°W

Tynedale District
- Former district
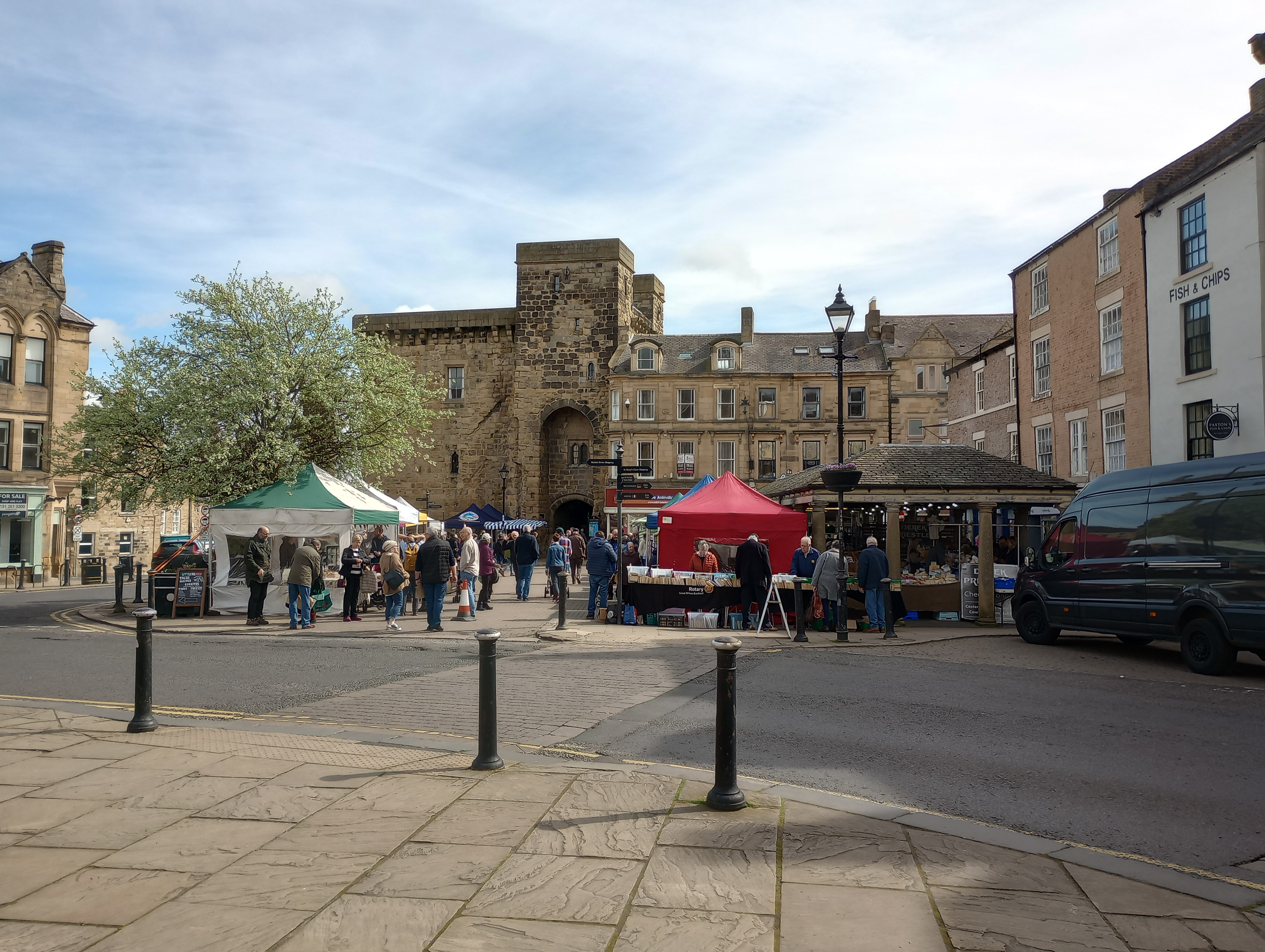
- Hexham Farmers' Market

- Shown within Northumberland
- Sovereign state: United Kingdom
- Constituent country: England
- Region: North East England
- Administrative county: Northumberland
- Established: 1 April 1974
- Abolished: 1 April 2009
- Admin. HQ: Hexham

Government
  - Type: Tynedale District Council
  - Leadership: Alternative – Sec.31

Area
  - Total: 857 sq mi (2,219 km^{2})
  - Rank: 2nd (formerly)

Population (2001 census)
  - Total: 58,808
  - Density: 68.64/sq mi (26.50/km^{2})
- Time zone: UTC+0 (Greenwich Mean Time)
  - Summer (DST): UTC+1 (British Summer Time)
- ONS code: 35UF
- Ethnicity: 99.3% White
- Website: www.tynedale.gov.uk

Tynedale was a local government district in Northumberland, England. The district had a resident population of 58,808 according to the 2001 census. The main towns were Hexham, Haltwhistle and Prudhoe. The district contained part of Hadrian's Wall and the southern part of Northumberland National Park.

With an area of 2,219 km^{2} (857 sq mi) it was the largest English district created in 1974 and remained so until 1996 when it was superseded by the East Riding of Yorkshire. It was bigger than several English counties, including Nottinghamshire, Leicestershire and Hertfordshire. It was also the second-least densely populated district (behind Eden, Cumbria). The district was formed on 1 April 1974, under the Local Government Act 1972, and was a merger of Hexham and Prudhoe urban districts, along with Bellingham, Haltwhistle and Hexham rural districts.

Tynedale was historically a liberty created alongside the county of Hexhamshire by Henry I of England.

The district was abolished as part of the 2009 structural changes to local government in England effective from 1 April 2009 with responsibilities being transferred to Northumberland County Council, a unitary authority. However, the name "Tynedale", which predates the formation of the council, is still widely used for the Tyne Valley area of Northumberland. Since then, Northumberland County Council has had a Tynedale area committee covering the area.

== Settlements and civil parishes ==
Tynedale contained the settlements and civil parishes of (towns highlighted in bold):

- Acomb, Allendale, Anick
- Bardon Mill, Bavington, Bellingham, Birtley, Blanchland, Broomhaugh and Riding, Broomley, Bywell
- Chollerton, Coanwood, **Corbridge**, Corsenside
- Falstone, Featherstone
- Greenhead, Greystead
- **Haltwhistle**, Hartleyburn, Haydon Bridge, Healey, Hedley, Henshaw, **Hexham**, Hexhamshire, Hexhamshire Low Quarter, Horsley, Humshaugh
- Juniper
- Kielder, Kirkwhelpington, Knaresdale with Kirkhaugh
- Melkridge, Mickley
- Newbrough
- Otterburn, Ovingham, Ovington
- Plenmeller with Whitfield, **Prudhoe**
- Rochester
- Sandhoe, Shotley Low Quarter, Simonburn, Slaley, Stocksfield
- Tarset, Thirlwall
- Wall, Warden, Wark, West Allen, Whitfield, Whittington, Wylam

== See also ==
- Tynedale District Council elections
- Tynedale RFC
