= Cathedral Church of St Marie, Sheffield =

Coordinates: 53°22′53″N 1°28′06″W

Cathedral Church of St Marie
- Cathedral Church of St Marie, Sheffield
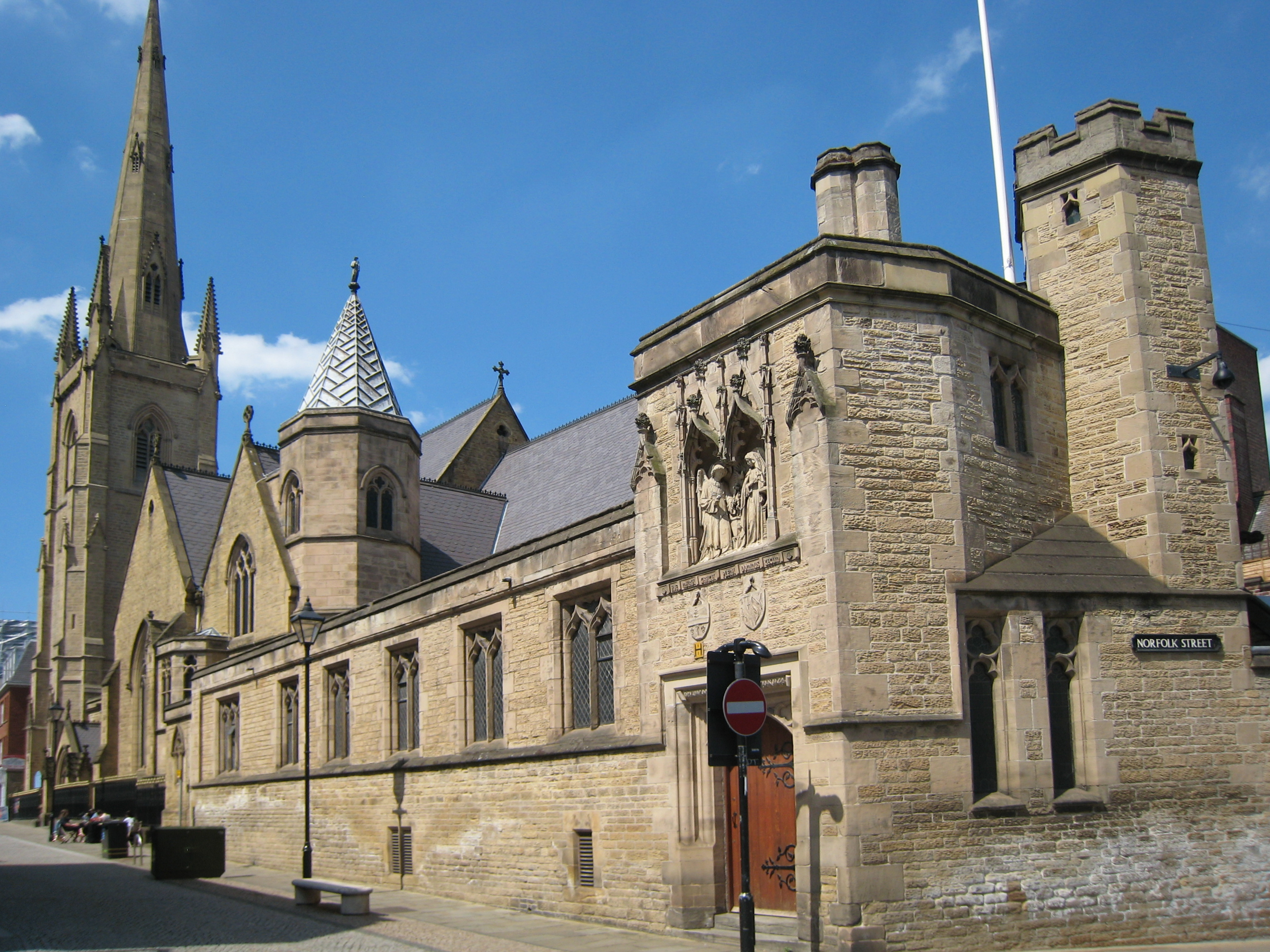

- Shown within Sheffield
- OS grid reference: SK 35474 87293
- Location: Sheffield, South Yorkshire
- Country: England
- Denomination: Roman Catholic
- Website: stmariecathedral.org

History
- Consecrated: 1889

Architecture
- Architect: Matthew Ellison Hadfield
- Style: Gothic Revival
- Years built: 1846–1850

Administration
- Province: Liverpool (since 1911)
- Diocese: Hallam

Clergy
- Archbishop: John Sherrington
- Bishop: Sede vacante
- Dean: Christopher Posluszny

The Cathedral Church of St Marie is the Roman Catholic cathedral in Sheffield, England. It lies in a slightly hidden location, just off Fargate shopping street, but signals its presence with a 195 feet (59 m) spire, the tallest in Sheffield. It is a notable example of an English Roman Catholic cathedral, with much fine interior decoration. Reordering of the sanctuary following the Second Vatican Council has been sensitive. There are several notable side altars as well as historic statues and painted tiles.

== History ==
=== Reformation ===
Before the English Reformation the Church of England was part of the Roman Catholic Church and Sheffield's medieval parish church of St Peter (now the Cathedral Church of Saint Peter and Saint Paul) was the principal Catholic church in the district. In 1534, during the reign of Henry VIII, the Church of England separated from Rome and Catholic worship was outlawed. Until the 18th century, Catholics faced fines, loss of property and social exclusion and Catholic priests were hunted down, imprisoned and martyred. The main landowners in Sheffield were the Dukes of Norfolk, and the Shrewsbury Chapel in the now Anglican parish church remained Catholic until 1933. During the reordering of St Mary's in 1970, at the invitation of the Anglican cathedral, Mass was celebrated on the altar of the Shrewsbury Chapel once again. The altar retains its Catholic consecration crosses and relics. Mass was celebrated in a few houses of gentry in Sheffield, including in a house on Fargate that belonged to the Duke of Norfolk, which had a hidden chapel in its roof.

=== Establishment of the Church of St Marie ===
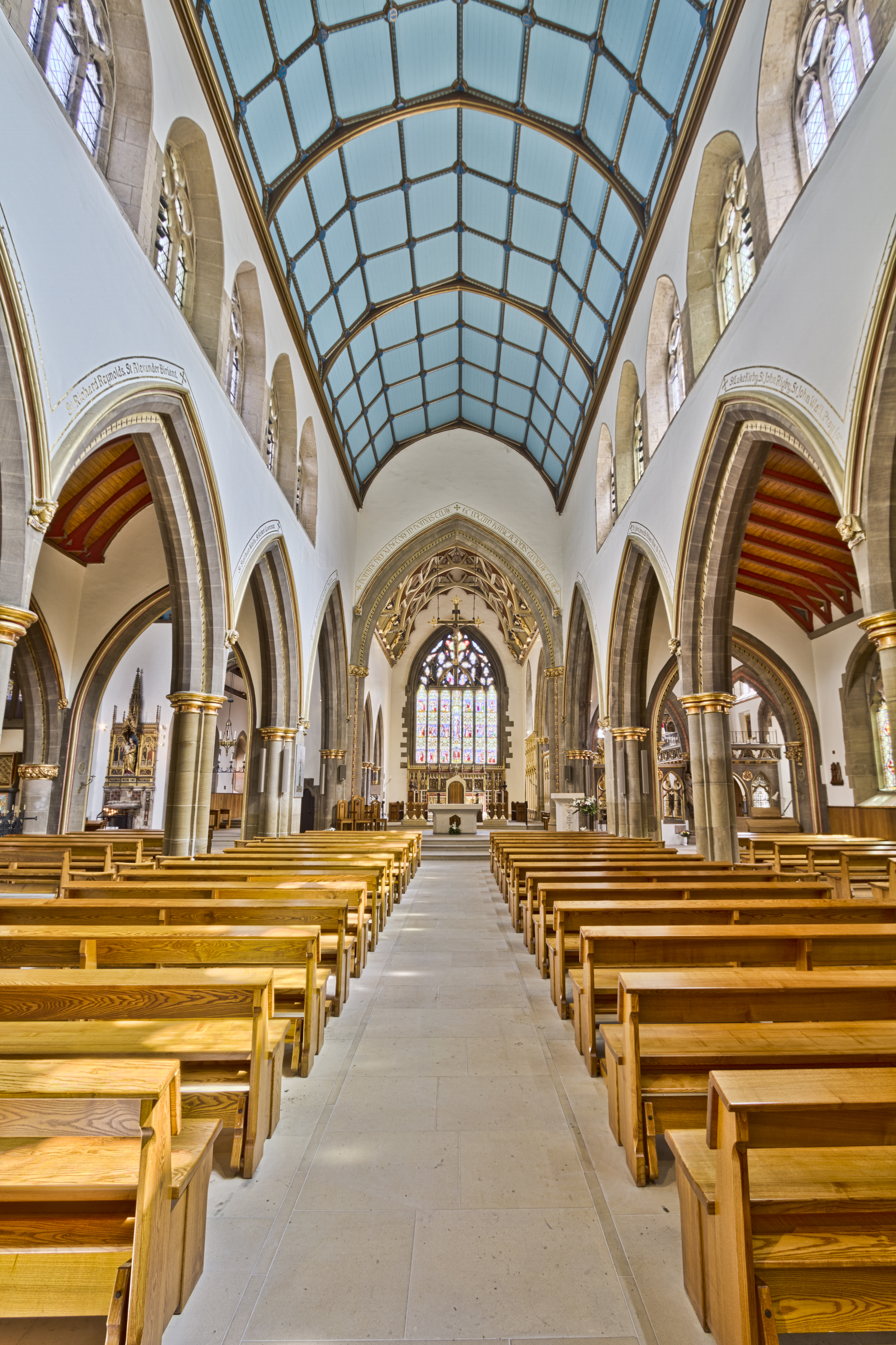
Nave of the cathedral

The Catholic Emancipation of the late 18th and early 19th centuries allowed Catholics to worship more openly. Sheffield Catholics bought the ageing house which stood on the corner of Fargate and Norfolk Row. They built a small chapel in its back garden on a site which is now between the mortuary and the Blessed Sacrament chapels. The names of the priests who served Sheffield before the cathedral was built and the dates of their deaths are on the wall of the Mortuary Chapel. The rest of the land where the cathedral now stands became a cemetery. (Bodies from the cemetery were moved to the new Catholic cemetery at St Bede's in Rotherham and work on St Marie's began.) By 1846 the chapel was too small and the young priest, Fr Pratt, was keen to build a church for the expanding town. A leading local architect, Matthew Ellison Hadfield, designed St Marie's based on a 14th-century church at Heckington in Lincolnshire. The church was expensively decorated with the aid of generous donations from the Duke of Norfolk, his mother and parishioners. Pratt died while the church was being built and was buried at St Bede's. However, a stonemason who had often heard Pratt say he wanted to be buried in St Marie's, dug up the coffin and reburied it in a tomb he had prepared near the altar. Pratt's coffin still lies there and a plaque marks the spot, but his effigy has been moved to beneath the altar in the Mortuary chapel.

St Marie's was completed in 1850 and opened on 11 September. Building the church cost more than £10,500 – a very large sum in those days (about £1.5 million in 2020) – and it was not until 1889 that the church was free from debt. The Parish of St Marie's, which covered the whole of Sheffield, became part of the Diocese of Beverley in 1850, when Catholic dioceses were re-established for the first time since the English Reformation. In 1902 a new presbytery, now known as Cathedral House, was opened. During the Second World War a bomb blew out stained glass windows in the Blessed Sacrament chapel. The remaining windows were removed and stored in a shaft at Nunnery Colliery. The mine flooded during the war, the glass sunk in mud, and drawings for recreating the windows were destroyed, however it was still possible to reinstall the windows in 1947. When St Marie's was reordered in 1970 following Vatican II, dark woodwork was removed and new lighting and benches were installed. In 1972, a new altar allowing Mass to be celebrated versus populum was consecrated by Bishop Gerald Moverley, auxiliary Bishop of Leeds. The church is a Grade II* listed building and was first listed in 1973.

=== Role as a Cathedral ===
On 30 May 1980 the new Diocese of Hallam was created and St Marie's became a cathedral. Bishop Moverley was installed as its first bishop and served until his death in 1996, after which Bishop John Rawsthorne became the second Bishop of Hallam.

An extensive programme of renovations caused the cathedral to close in September 2011, reopening in November 2012. During that time the sanctuary was extended into the crossing and reordered, a new cathedra was installed and the choir moved to the west end of the building. Side chapels and roofing was restored, in some cases revealing original features previously hidden. New heating and toilet facilities have also been installed. During the restoration process, a collection of Nottingham alabaster carvings, mostly originating from the 15th century, were discovered and also underwent extensive restoration, finally going on display in the cathedral cloisters in April 2017.

Following the reopening in November 2012, Bishop Rawsthorne retired at the age of 78. In July 2014, Bishop Ralph Heskett was installed as the third Bishop of Hallam. Bishop Ralph served until his retirement in March 2026, after which Bishop Marcus Stock was appointed Apostolic Administrator of the Diocese of Hallam.

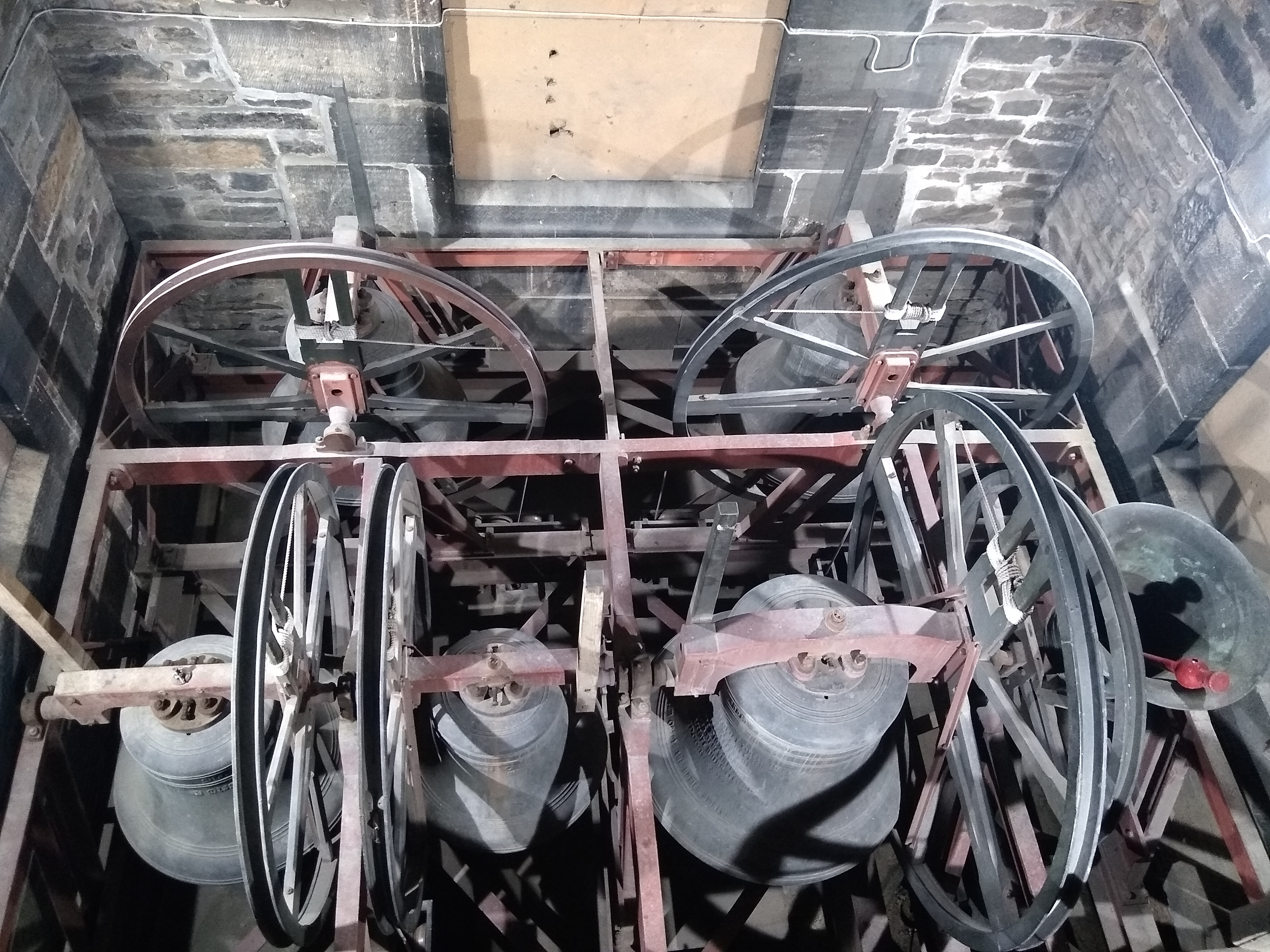
Interior of the cathedral's belfry

The cathedral is one of few Catholic churches equipped for change ringing. It has eight bells in the ring and an Angelus bell. The main ring is by Mears & Stainbank from 1874, the Angelus being an earlier 1850 Charles & George Mears. Steel bells were first installed in 1861, before being replaced with bronze ones in 1874.

In recent years, the cathedral has been developed as a place of public interest, and as a concert venue, having hosted many choral ensembles.

== Clergy ==
The Cathedral dean and other clergy based at the Cathedral also serve the church of the Holy Family in Arbourthorne, and the church of Our Lady Queen of Peace and St Oswald in Wybourn.

Records
Preceded by Sheffield Cathedral; 49 m (161 ft)	Tallest building in Sheffield; 1850 – 1896	Succeeded by Sheffield Town Hall; 61 m (200 ft)
