= 1995 Tynedale District Council election =

1995 UK local government election

An election for the Tynedale District Council was held on 4 May 1995. The Labour Party won the most seats, although the council stayed under no overall control. The whole council was up for election, and turnout was 49.0%.

== Election result ==
Tynedale local election result 1995
Party	Seats	Gains	Losses	Net gain/loss	Seats %	Votes %	Votes	+/−
Labour	18					35.4		+11.2
Conservative	11					26.9		-3.6
Liberal Democrats	11					18.2		-6.0
Independent	7					18.4		-2.7
Green	0				0.0	1.1		New

== See also ==
- Tynedale District Council elections
