= St Mary's Roman Catholic Church, Clapham =

St Mary's, Clapham
- Our Immaculate Lady of Victories
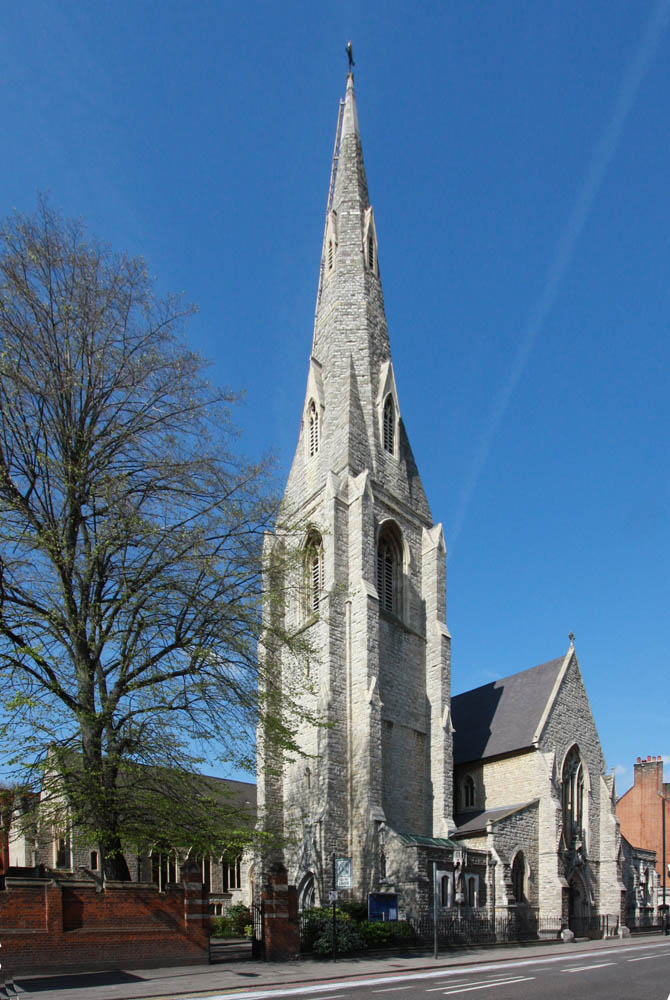

- Location in Greater London
- 51°27′42″N 0°8′14″W
- OS grid reference: TQ 29490 75270
- Location: Clapham Park Road in Clapham, South London
- Country: England
- Denomination: Roman Catholic
- Religious order: Redemptorist
- Website: stmarys-clapham.org.uk

History
- Status: Parish Church
- Dedication: Our Immaculate Lady of Victories
- Dedicated: 14 May 1851 by Cardinal Nicholas Wiseman

Architecture
- Functional status: Active
- Heritage designation: Grade II*-listed
- Designated: 8 February 1979
- Architect: William Wardell
- Architectural type: Gothic Revival
- Years built: 1849 – 1851

Administration
- Archdiocese: Southwark

Clergy
- Priest: Fr Caspar Mukabva CSsR

St Mary's Church, Clapham, officially Our Immaculate Lady of Victories, is a Grade II*-listed Roman Catholic church on Clapham Park Road in Clapham, South London, England run by the London province of the Redemptorist Congregation within the Archdiocese of Southwark. The church is located on the corner of Clapham Common, near Clapham Common tube station.

The current Bishop of Hallam, Ralph Heskett, was parish priest at St Mary's between 1999 and 2008. The current parish priest of St Mary's is Fr Caspar Mukabva CSsR.

== Church building ==
Founded by Bishop (later Cardinal) Nicholas Wiseman, the foundation stone of the current church of St Mary's was laid in 1849. Designed in a Gothic Revival style by William Wardell, with fittings by John Francis Bentley, the building was completed during 1851 and blessed by Cardinal Wiseman on 14 May 1851. On 8 February 1979 the church was listed on the National Heritage List for England.

The church is joined to the adjacent Redemptorist monastery which is also a grade II* listed building.

== See also ==
- St Mary's Roman Catholic Primary School
