= Slaley, Northumberland =

Village in Northumberland, England

Coordinates: 54.914°N 2.037°W

Slaley
- Location within Northumberland
- Population: 711 (2011)
- OS grid reference: NY977577
- Unitary authority: Northumberland
- Ceremonial county: Northumberland
- Region: North East
- Country: England
- Sovereign state: United Kingdom
- Post town: HEXHAM
- Postcode district: NE47
- Dialling code: 01434
- Police: Northumbria
- Fire: Northumberland
- Ambulance: North East
- UK Parliament: Hexham

Slaley is a village in Northumberland, England. It is situated to the southeast of Hexham. It is surrounded by the following villages: Ruffside, Whitley Chapel, Ordley, Wooley, Healey, Juniper, Riding Lea, and Blanchland.

The parish church is dedicated to St Mary the Virgin. The present church dates from 1832 (with extensive repairs in 1907–8) and was designed by Milton Carr. It stands on the site of an earlier church built in 1312, and that church was built on an earlier church mentioned in 1239 when Gilbert de Sclaueley gave the church and some lands to the prior of Hexham.

The nearby hamlet of Shield Hall has the remains of a medieval unfortified house (late 13th/early 14th century). It has been incorporated into the early 19th century farmhouse.

The nearby hamlet of Dukesfield is mentioned in 1256 as the scene of a murder. The area was part of the barony of Bolbec. In 1834 lead mining and smelting began. Dukefield Hall is a listed building.

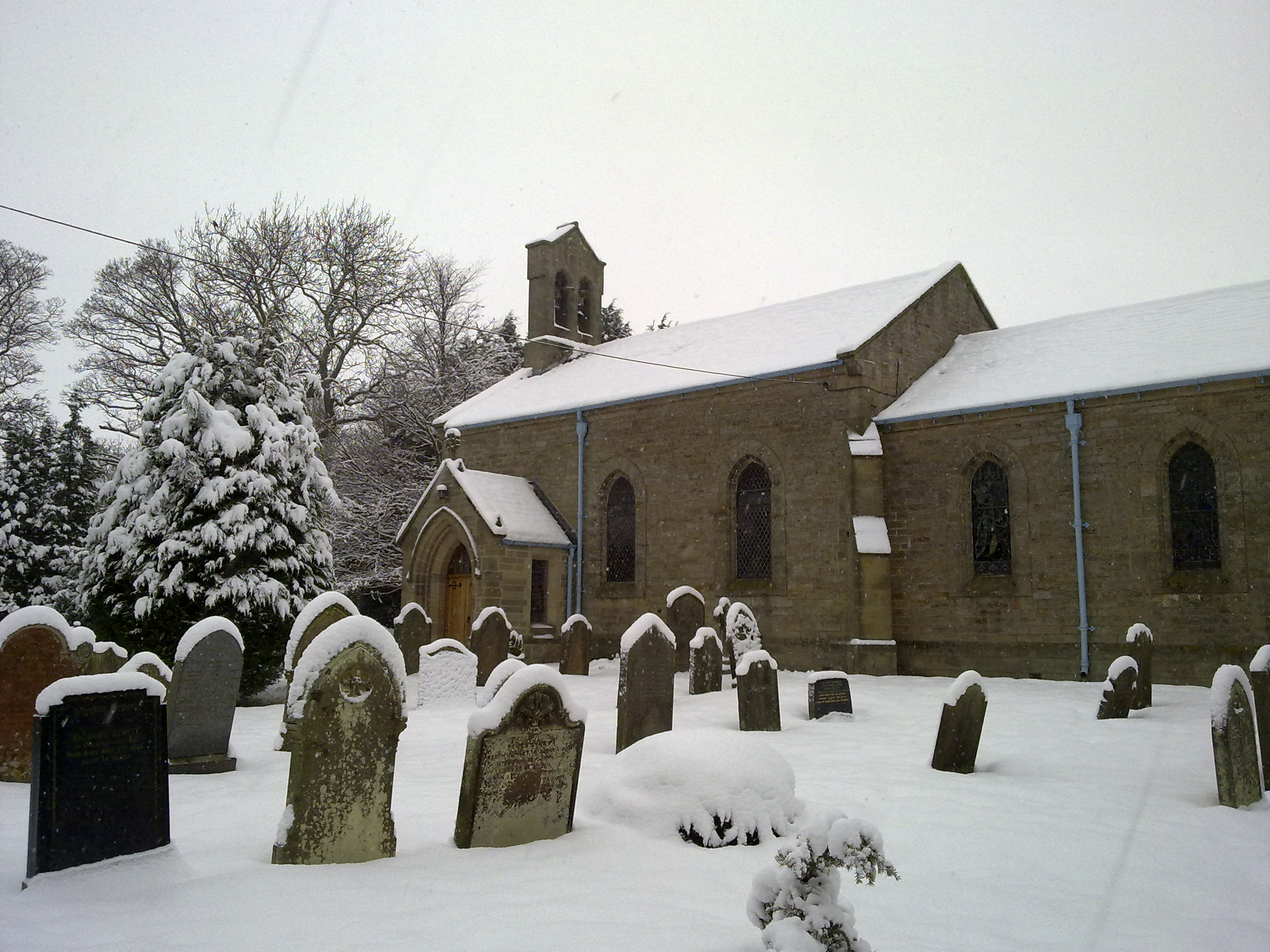
St Mary's Church

To the north of the village there is a disused nuclear bunker. The bunker was opened in 1961 and closed 1991.

The only public transport is the twice daily 689 bus service (three times Saturday) between Consett and Hexham via Whittonstall and Ebchester, also calling in at nearby Slaley Hall.

== See also ==
- Slaley Hall
