= Hexhamshire Low Quarter =

Former civil parish in Northumberland, England

Coordinates: 54.921°N 2.101°W

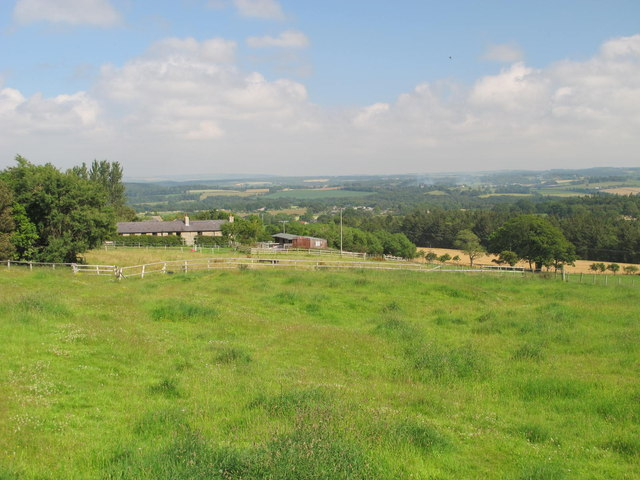
- Site of the medieval village at Dotland

- Location within Northumberland
- OS grid reference: NY935585
- Civil parish: Hexhamshire
- Unitary authority: Northumberland
- Ceremonial county: Northumberland
- Region: North East
- Country: England
- Sovereign state: United Kingdom
- Post town: HEXHAM
- Postcode district: NE47
- Police: Northumbria
- Fire: Northumberland
- Ambulance: North East
- UK Parliament: Hexham

Hexhamshire Low Quarter is a former civil parish, now in the parish of Hexhamshire, in Northumberland, England. It was situated to the south of Hexham and to the north of Hexhamshire civil parish proper. The largest settlement in the parish was Juniper. In 1961, the parish had a population of 223.

== History ==
Hexhamshire Low Quarter was formerly a township; from 1866, Hexhamshire Low Quarter was a civil parish in its own right. On 1 April 1955, Hexhamshire West Quarter was merged with Hexhamshire Low Quarter. On 1 April 2011, the parish was abolished and merged with Hexhamshire.
