= Charles Caruana =

Roman Catholic Bishop of Gibraltar

His Excellency Charles Caruana
- Bishop of Gibraltar
- Diocese: Roman Catholic Diocese of Gibraltar
- Installed: 14 February 1998
- Term ended: 18 March 2010
- Predecessor: Bernard Patrick Devlin
- Successor: Ralph Heskett

Orders
- Ordination: 24 May 1959
- Consecration: 24 May 1999

Personal details
- Born: 9 October 1932 Gibraltar
- Died: 1 October 2010 (aged 77) St Bernard's Hospital, Gibraltar
- Buried: Lying in state, Chapel of Our Lady of Lourdes, Cathedral of St. Mary the Crowned
- Denomination: Roman Catholic
- Residence: Gibraltar

Charles Caruana CBE (9 October 1932, Gibraltar – 1 October 2010, Gibraltar) was a Gibraltarian Roman Catholic bishop of Maltese descent. He was appointed sixth Roman Catholic Bishop of Gibraltar on 14 February 1998 and ordained on 24 May 1998. His retirement request was accepted on 18 March 2010. He died at St Bernard's Hospital, Gibraltar on 1 October 2010 following a bout of ill health.

== Early life ==
Charles Caruana was born on 9 October 1932 in the British colony of Gibraltar (now a British overseas territory). His ancestors were part of a group of Caruanas that settled in Gibraltar from their home in Malta during the 1800s. His great grandfather moved to Gibraltar with his grandfather and his four great uncles. This rendered Caruana a second-generation Gibraltarian. At the time of his birth, his family lived in Lynch's Lane, just off Main Street.

During World War II he was evacuated with his family to London where he spent six months in Notting Hill Gate tube station seeking shelter from the bombings. He was first educated by the Christian Brothers when he was later re-evacuated to Northern Ireland. He already felt a religious calling by the age of 13 to 14, wanting to become a Christian Brother himself. On his return to Gibraltar, he joined the civil service, working in the Central Employment Exchange for four years.

== Priesthood ==
Caruana eventually went off to St. John's Seminary, Wonersh, Guildford in the United Kingdom, where he spent six years studying. He was ordained on 24 May 1959 starting work in the Cathedral of St. Mary the Crowned and later at the Sacred Heart Church, where he remained parish priest for 12 years. He later returned to the cathedral to take on the role of administrator. He also spent some time as prison chaplain at Moorish Castle. He was instrumental in the beginnings of the Catholic Charismatic Renewal, the Cursillo Movement and other movements of renewal.

=== Roman Catholic Bishop of Gibraltar ===
On 14 February 1999, Father Caruana was the second Gibraltarian to have been appointed Roman Catholic Bishop of Gibraltar by Pope John Paul II. He was consecrated on 24 May of the same year. On his birthday in 2007 he tendered his resignation to the Holy See, according to canon law provisos. On 18 March 2010 the Holy See announced that his resignation had been accepted and his successor as Bishop of Gibraltar would be the English redemptorist priest Ralph Heskett.

== Honours ==
Bishop Caruana was appointed Commander of the Order of the British Empire in 2008, receiving the award from Her Majesty Queen Elizabeth II in March 2008. He was also invested in 2003 by HRH Prince Carlo, Duke of Castro, as a Knight Commander of Grace of the Sacred Military Constantinian Order of Saint George.

In December 2011 Polish President Bronisław Komorowski posthumously awarded him the Knight's Cross of the Order of Merit of the Republic of Poland.

Bishop Caruana Road on Gibraltar is named in his honour.

== Gibraltar Song Festival ==
Bishop Caruana was instrumental in initiating the Gibraltar Song Festival. He first thought of the idea as a way of raising funds to build the Community Centre. The festival became so successful that the festival was to become an annual event.

== Works ==
Bishop Caruana is the author of several books about his home town. In 1989 he published The Rock Under A Cloud. In 2009, he authored History of Our Lady of Europe, a book published by the Vatican Press as part of the commemoration of the 700 years of devotion of Our Lady of Europe, one of the Catholic patron saints of Gibraltar.

== Death ==
Bishop Emeritus Caruana died at St Bernard's Hospital on Friday 1 October 2010 at around 6 am. He had been in and out of hospital as he had been in poor health for a number of months but his health is believed to have deteriorated rapidly following a fall just over a week prior to his death, just 8 days before his 78th birthday. Flags around Gibraltar, like those at the Moorish Castle, No. 6 Convent Place, The Convent and other public buildings were flown at half-mast as a symbol of respect. His body, robed in his full pontificals, lay in state at the Chapel of Our Lady of Lourdes in the Cathedral of St. Mary the Crowned until his funeral, allowing the public to file past the catafalque to pay their respects. His funeral was on Tuesday 4 October 2010 at John Mackintosh Square, where his body was carried in procession from the cathedral. After the service he was buried in the crypt beneath the cathedral.
