= Listed buildings in North Otterington =

North Otterington is a civil parish in the county of North Yorkshire, England. It contains two listed buildings that are recorded in the National Heritage List for England. Both the listed buildings are designated at Grade II, the lowest of the three grades, which is applied to "buildings of national importance and special interest". The parish does not contain any significant settlement, and the listed buildings consist of a church and a house.

== Buildings ==
| Name and location | Photograph | Date | Notes |
|---|---|---|---|
| St Michael's Church; 54.30163°N 1.44429°W | | 12th century | The church has been altered and extended through the centuries, including a restoration in 1873 by G. Fowler Jones. It is built in stone with a stone slate roof, and consists of a nave, a south aisle, a south porch and a chancel. On the west end of the nave is a square bell turret with a single-light bell opening on each side, a hood mould, a moulded eaves band, and a short pyramidal spire with a cross. The central porch has a chamfered surround and an elliptical arched entrance. |
| North Otterington House; 54.31308°N 1.44757°W | | Late 18th century | The house is in red brick on a plinth, with sill bands, embattled parapets, and a stone slate roof. There are five bays, the middle three with two storeys, and the outer ones projecting with three storeys, and a rear wing on the left. In the centre is a doorway with Roman Doric half-columns, pilasters, a fanlight, an impost band, a frieze, a cornice and a pediment. The windows are sashes, some horizontally-sliding. At the rear is a doorway with Ionic columns, a frieze and a cornice. |
