= Sacred Heart Church, Gibraltar =

Sacred Heart Church
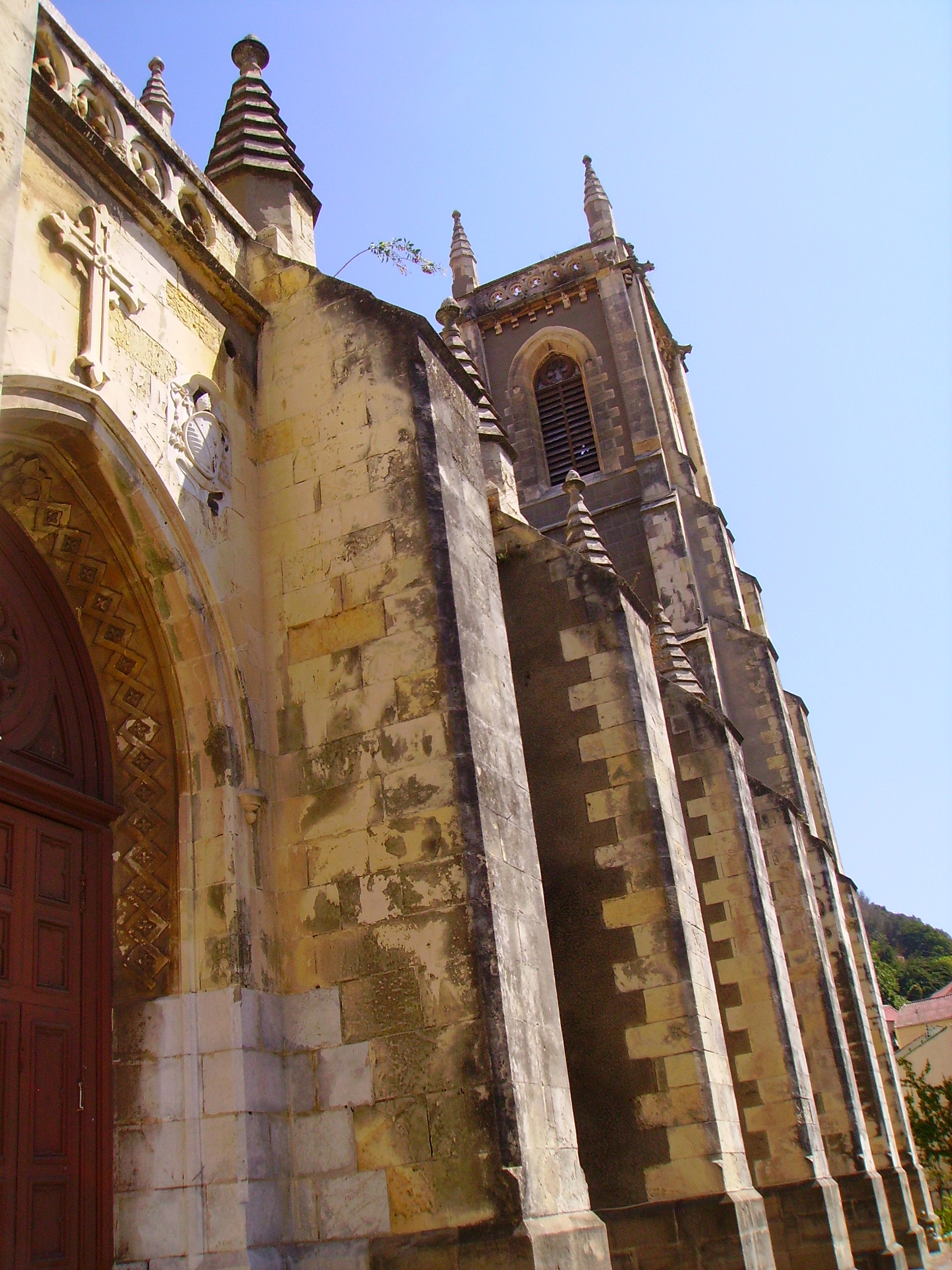
- Sacred Heart Church
- Sacred Heart Church
- 36°08′21.4″N 5°21′02.4″W
- Country: Gibraltar
- Denomination: Roman Catholic

History
- Founded: 1874
- Dedicated: 1888

Sacred Heart Church is a Catholic church in Gibraltar.

== Description ==
The church is of Gothic design, the foundation stone was laid on March 25, 1874, attended by Félix María Arrieta y Llano, Bishop of Cadiz, and John Baptist Scandella, Vicar Apostolic of Gibraltar, although it was not formally blessed until July 15, 1888.

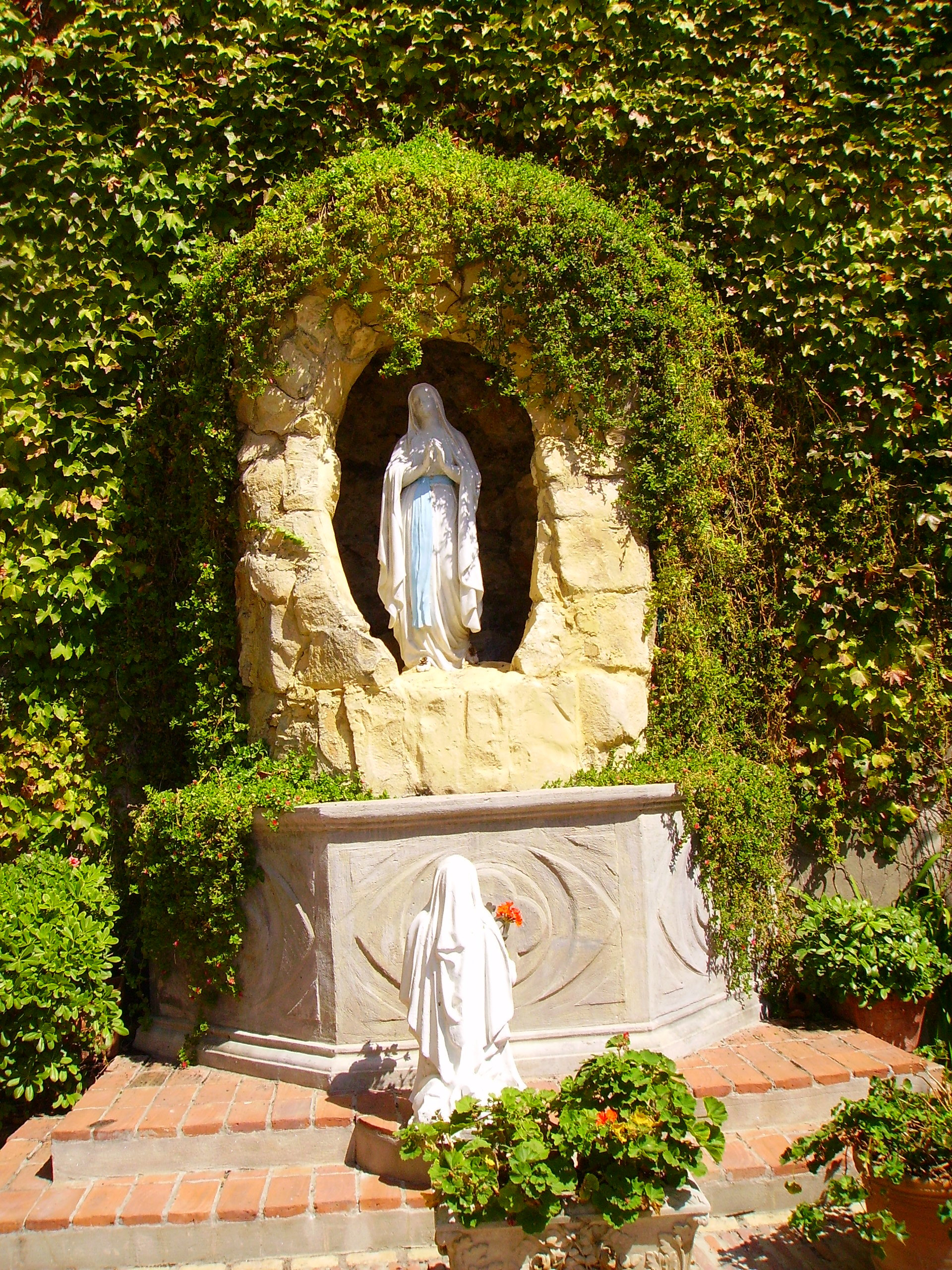
Our Lady of Lourdes grotto

Amongst the parish priests of this church was Charles Caruana who went on to be the Roman Catholic Bishop of Gibraltar between 1998 and 2010.

In the patio of the church is a grotto dedicated to Our Lady of Lourdes.
