= Hullshire =

County corporate in the East Riding of Yorkshire, England

Coordinates: 53.771°N 0.411°W

Hullshire, or the County of the Town of Kingston upon Hull, was a county corporate in the East Riding of Yorkshire, England, which was created in 1440. It was an area that was removed from the jurisdiction of the Sheriff of Yorkshire to come under the authority of the Sheriff of Kingston upon Hull instead. The term Hullshire was particularly used for the part of the county corporate that lay outside the borough of Kingston upon Hull, covering an area to the west of the borough containing the three parishes of Hessle, Kirk Ella and North Ferriby. In 1838 the county corporate was reduced in area to match the borough. The borough remained a county corporate with its own sheriff until 1974.

== History ==
The borough of Kingston upon Hull (generally known as Hull) was granted county corporate status in 1440 in the reign of Henry VI, when it was given the right to appoint its own sheriff, giving it judicial independence from the Sheriff of Yorkshire. An area to the west of Hull was added to the county corporate in 1447. The area was self-governing in respect of it having its own courts, with powers of oyer and terminer, to hold assizes on civil and criminal cases. The county corporate then included the borough plus the parishes of Hessle, North Ferriby, and Kirk Ella, including the various townships which belonged to those parishes, including Swanland, West Ella, Tranby (an area south of Anlaby and north of Hessle), Willerby and Anlaby. The county corporate also included the extra-parochial area of Haltemprice Priory. The rights previously given to the town of Hull were extended to the county corporate, with the Mayor acting as the king's escheator, and with the town bailiffs replaced by a sheriff and twelve aldermen, acting as justices of the peace, with the burgesses to answer before the mayor and sheriff first, not the king. The justices of the peace of the East Riding had no legal authority over the area. At the same time Hull Castle became the responsibility of the town.

In 1515 a skirmish or battle was fought between the Sheriff of Hull and the Prior of Haltemprice Priory over the authority over Willerby (Willarby) and Wolfreton (Woolfreton) – the Prior claimed that though the priory was within Hullshire it was not part of it, and was within the Lordship of Cottingham, and had taken the issue to the Star Chamber; the case was referred to the Abbott of Meaux; Bryan Palmes; and Sir William Constable who had decided in the Prior's favour. Despite this decision on 6 October the Sheriff of Hull together with 200 people of the town began to approach Wolfreton; the Prior, who had been informed of the Sheriff's intentions roused his tenants, and armed the monks of the Priory, who then blocked the roads, and hurled abuse on the Sheriff and his people. The Sheriff's party returned the insults in turn using foul language. Subsequently, the altercation came to blows and a quarrel with arrows ensued. The battle continued until the monks, many being old or fat, gave way, and fled to their priory, followed by the Sheriff's group. The situation was prevented from becoming more inflamed by the arrival of the Lord Mayor of Hull, who having learned of what was happening hastened to the scene with 60 horsemen. Subsequently, the Prior sought redress in the Star Chamber, with the Sheriff accused of riot and other crimes – the legal proceedings continued for three years at much expense, leading to the settlement that the Prior was given Willerby and Newton within his authority, whilst Hull obtained free right to the freshwater springs of Anlaby.

Sculcoates, Drypool, the southern part of Sutton (Sutton-on-Hull), Garrison Side as well as the liberties of Myton and Trippett were added to the parliamentary borough in 1832, and in 1836 the new municipal borough was made to be of the same extent. (see also Municipal Corporations Act 1835). The parishes of Hessle, Kirk Ella and North Ferriby (including their associated hamlets and townships) were removed from the county corporate in 1838, such that thereafter the county corporate covered the same area as the borough. The name Hullshire had primarily been used for the parts of the county corporate that lay outside the borough of Kingston upon Hull, and so the term Hullshire fell out of use after 1838.

The borough of Kingston upon Hull then remained a county corporate with its own sheriff until 1974. The borough boundaries were subsequently enlarged on several occasions. Newington (parishes of Kirk Ella and North Ferriby); Stoneferry; Marfleet and Newland were added in the second half of the 19th century. For most practical purposes, the county corporate was effectively superseded in 1889 when Hull became a county borough. (See Local Government Act 1888)

== See also ==
- Hallamshire
- Hexhamshire
- Winchcombeshire
