= North Otterington =

Village and civil parish in North Yorkshire, England

Coordinates: 54°18′09″N 1°26′40″W

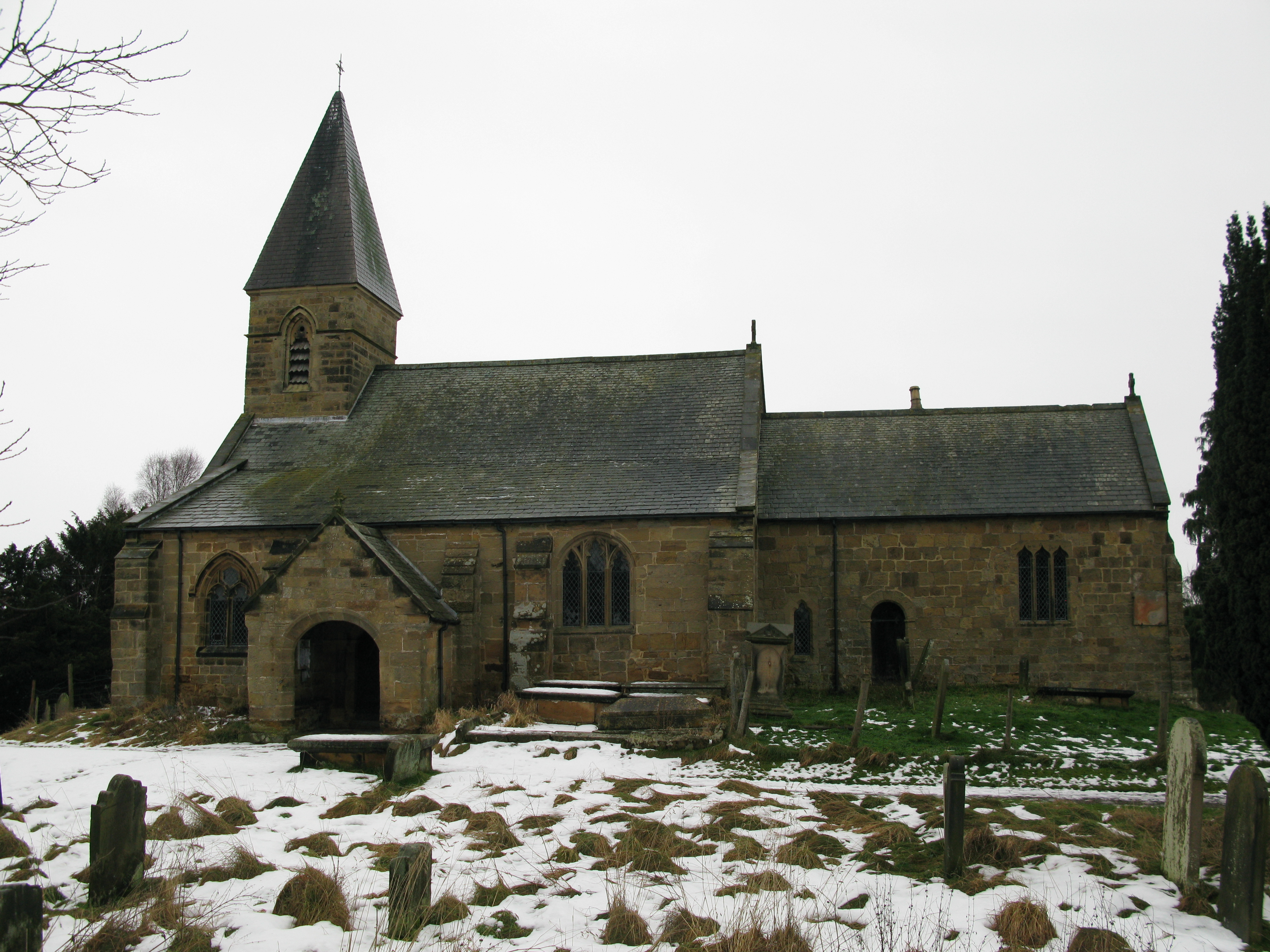
- St Michael and All Saints, North Otterington

- Location within North Yorkshire
- OS grid reference: SE362897
- Civil parish: North Otterington
- Unitary authority: North Yorkshire
- Ceremonial county: North Yorkshire
- Region: Yorkshire and the Humber
- Country: England
- Sovereign state: United Kingdom
- Post town: NORTHALLERTON
- Postcode district: DL7
- Police: North Yorkshire
- Fire: North Yorkshire
- Ambulance: Yorkshire

North Otterington is a civil parish with no village centre on the east bank of the River Wiske, in the county of North Yorkshire, England. North Yorkshire County Council estimated its population in 2011 to be 40 and 30 in 2015. Details are also included in the civil parish of Ainderby Steeple. It is on the A167 road 3 miles (4.8 km) south of Northallerton; South Otterington is further south on the same road.

The Otterinton name is from Old English (Oter's Tun) and means the town of Oter's people. It was recorded in the Domesday Book as Otrinctun in the Hundred (Wapentake) of Allerton.

From 1974 to 2023 North Otterington was part of the Hambleton District of North Yorkshire, it is now administered by the unitary North Yorkshire Council.

St Michael's Church, North Otterington dates to the 12th century and was expanded in the 14th, 17th and 19th centuries. The site was important in Saxon times, Saxon coffins and swords were unearthed in the 19th century restoration but the first vicar was not recorded until 1282. For many years, St Michael's was the Mother Church of the parish and wider area and corpse roads extended from Thornton-le-Moor and Thornton le Beans which are still marked on modern day Ordnance Survey maps. The church is grade II listed and used for services on three Sundays of each month.

== See also ==
- Listed buildings in North Otterington
