= St Michael's Church, North Otterington =

Church in North Otterington, North Yorkshire, England

Coordinates: 54.3016°N 1.4443°W

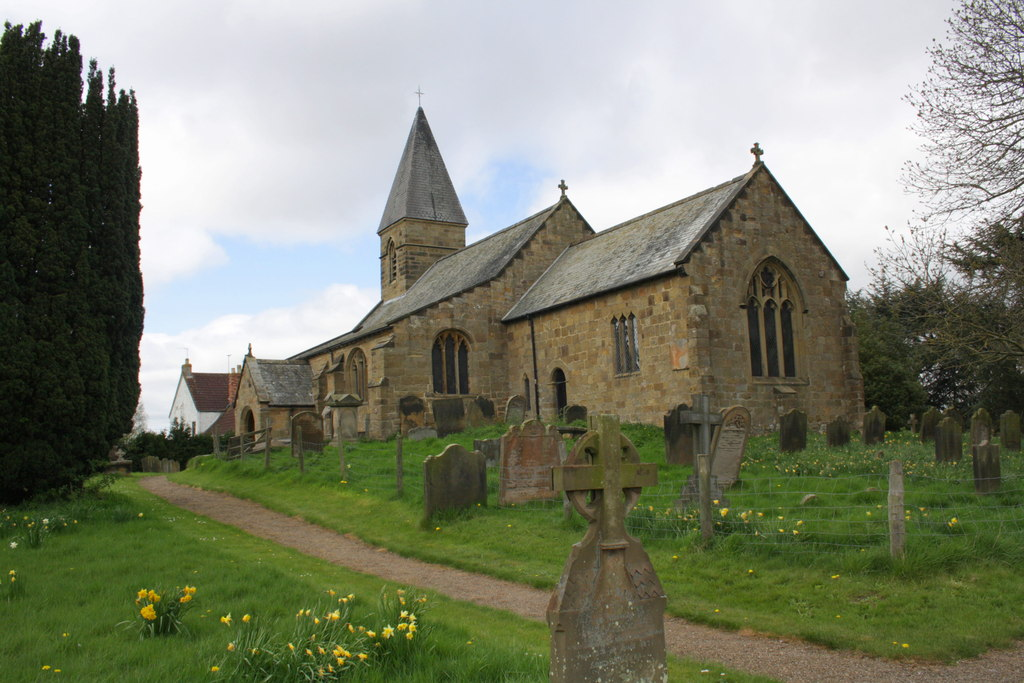
The church, in 2013

St Michael's Church is the parish church of North Otterington, a village in North Yorkshire, in England.

The church was built in the 12th century, from which period the nave and chancel walls survive, along with a doorway, one window and part of another. In the 14th century, a north aisle was added. The church was restored in the 17th century, and again in 1873 by George Fowler Jones. His work included thinning the east wall and a inserting a new window, and adding a tower and porch. The church was grade II listed in 1986.

The church is built of stone with a stone slate roof, and consists of a nave, a south aisle, a south porch and a chancel. On the west end of the nave is a square bell turret with a single-light bell opening on each side, a hood mould, a moulded eaves band, and a short pyramidal spire with a cross. The central porch has a chamfered surround and an elliptical arched entrance. Inside, there are some fragments of carved 10th-century stonework, and a heavily restored 15th-century screen.

== See also ==
- Listed buildings in North Otterington
