= Tynedale District Council elections =

Local government elections in Northumberland, England

Tynedale District Council elections were generally held every four years between the council's creation in 1974 and its abolition in 2009. Tynedale was a non-metropolitan district in Northumberland, England. The council was abolished and its functions transferred to Northumberland County Council with effect from 1 April 2009.

== Political control ==
The first election to the council was held in 1973, initially operating as a shadow authority before coming into its powers on 1 April 1974. From 1974 until its abolition in 2009 political control of the council was as follows:

Party in control	Years
No overall control	1973–1976
Independent	1976–1979
No overall control	1979–2003
Conservative	2003–2009

== Council elections ==
- 1973 Tynedale District Council election
- 1976 Tynedale District Council election (New ward boundaries)
- 1979 Tynedale District Council election
- 1983 Tynedale District Council election
- 1987 Tynedale District Council election (District boundary changes took place but the number of seats remained the same)
- 1991 Tynedale District Council election (District boundary changes took place but the number of seats remained the same)
- 1995 Tynedale District Council election (District boundary changes took place but the number of seats remained the same)
- 1999 Tynedale District Council election (New ward boundaries)
- 2003 Tynedale District Council election
- 2007 Tynedale District Council election

== Results maps ==
2003 results map

2007 results map

== By-election results ==
=== 1995-1999 ===
Warden and Newbrough By-Election 3 December 1998
Party	Candidate	Votes	%	±%
Conservative		unopposed		
Conservative gain from Liberal Democrats		Swing		

=== 1999-2003 ===
Hexham Gilesgate By-Election 25 May 2000
Party	Candidate	Votes	%	±%
Conservative		248	56.2	+27.2
Labour		193	43.8	−27.2
Majority		55	12.4	
Turnout		441		
Conservative gain from Labour		Swing		

Prudhoe Castle By-Election 22 February 2001 (2)
Party	Candidate	Votes	%	±%
Labour		193		
Liberal Democrats		179		
Labour		170		
Liberal Democrats		137		
Turnout		679	22.2	
Labour hold		Swing		
Liberal Democrats gain from Labour		Swing		

Stockfield with Mickley By-Election 8 November 2001
Party	Candidate	Votes	%	±%
Conservative		648	68.1	+16.1
Liberal Democrats		218	22.9	−2.1
Labour		85	8.9	−14.0
Majority		430	45.2	
Turnout		951	30.0	
Conservative hold		Swing		

=== 2003-2007 ===
Hexham Hencotes By-Election 26 May 2005
Party	Candidate	Votes	%	±%
Conservative		580	51.3	+20.4
Liberal Democrats	Hazel Richardson	299	26.5	+7.2
Labour		251	22.2	−3.3
Majority		281	24.8	
Turnout		1,130	43.4	
Conservative hold		Swing		

Hexham Leazes By-Election 13 October 2005
Party	Candidate	Votes	%	±%
Conservative	Rad Hare	596	59.1	+11.2
Liberal Democrats	Don Stewart	412	40.9	−11.2
Majority		184	18.2	
Turnout		1,008	38.0	
Conservative gain from Liberal Democrats		Swing		

Wylam By-Election 25 May 2006
Party	Candidate	Votes	%	±%
Liberal Democrats	Tom Appleby	364	44.5	+13.8
Conservative	Charles Heslop	247	30.2	+21.1
Labour	Andrew Balman	206	25.2	+13.2
Majority		117	14.3	
Turnout		817	52.3	
Liberal Democrats hold		Swing		

=== 2007-2009 ===
Hexham Gilesgate By-Election 8 February 2008
Party	Candidate	Votes	%	±%
Conservative	Paul Dixon	179	53.6	−23.8
Liberal Democrats	Paul Harrison	94	28.1	+5.5
Labour	Caroline Watson	61	18.3	+18.3
Majority		85	25.5	
Turnout		334	40.6	
Conservative hold		Swing		
