= Diocese of Hallam =

Latin Catholic ecclesiastical territory in England

Diocese of Hallam Dioecesis Hallamensis

Catholic
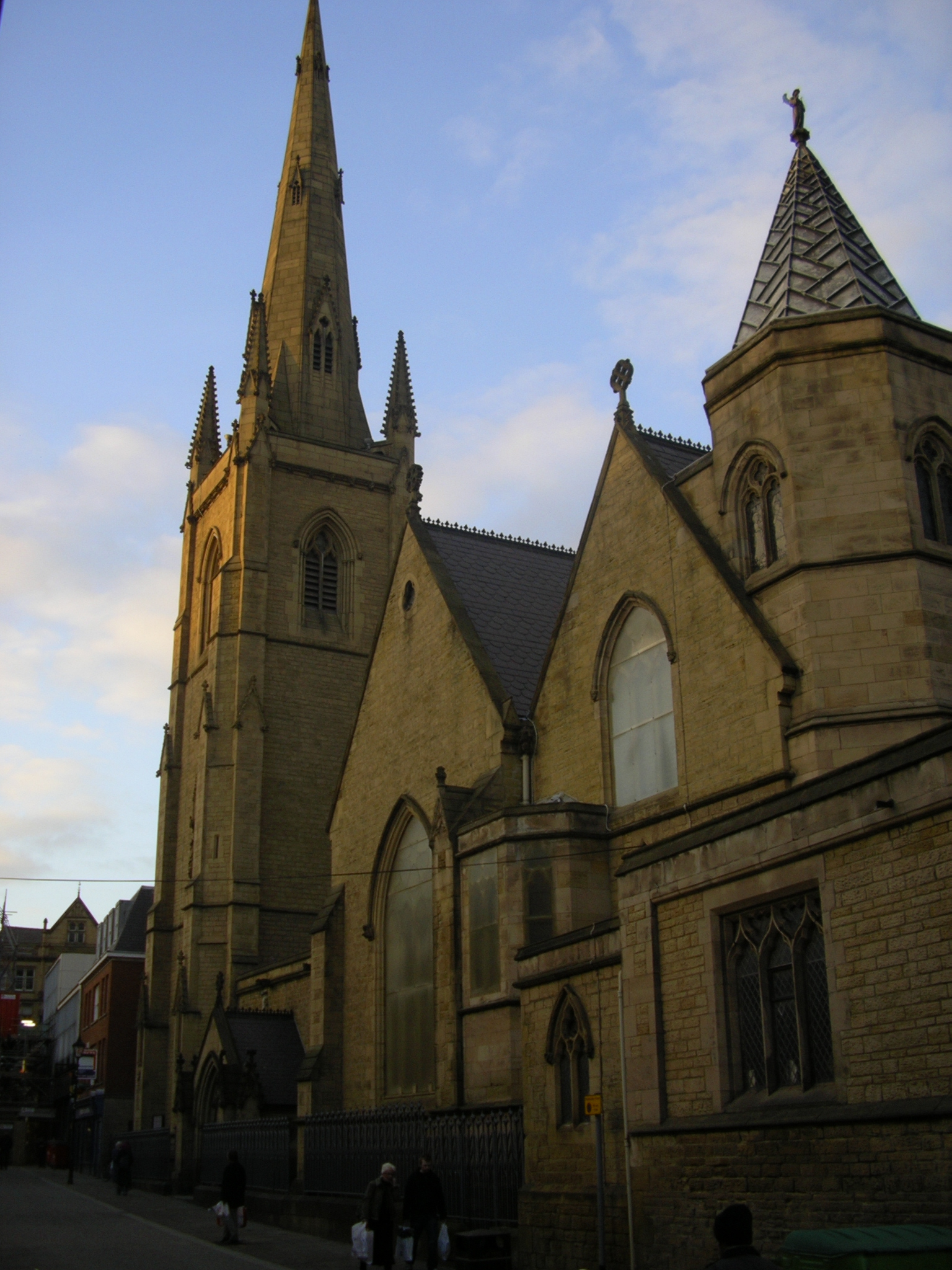
- Cathedral Church of St Marie, Sheffield

Location
- Country: England
- Territory: South Yorkshire; With parts of: Derbyshire; Nottinghamshire
- Ecclesiastical province: Liverpool
- Deaneries: 6
- Coordinates: 53.383°N 1.465°W

Statistics
- Area: 1,030 km^{2} (400 sq mi)
- Population: Total; Catholics: (as of 2013); 1,569,000; 60,188 (3.8%)
- Parishes: 60

Information
- Denomination: Catholic Church
- Sui iuris church: Latin Church
- Rite: Roman Rite
- Established: 30 May 1980
- Cathedral: Cathedral Church of St Marie
- Secular priests: 65

Current leadership
- Pope: Leo XIV
- Bishop: sede vacante
- Metropolitan Archbishop: John Francis Sherrington
- Vicar General: Fr. Desmond Sexton
- Bishops emeritus: John Rawsthorne, Ralph Heskett, C.Ss.R.

Map
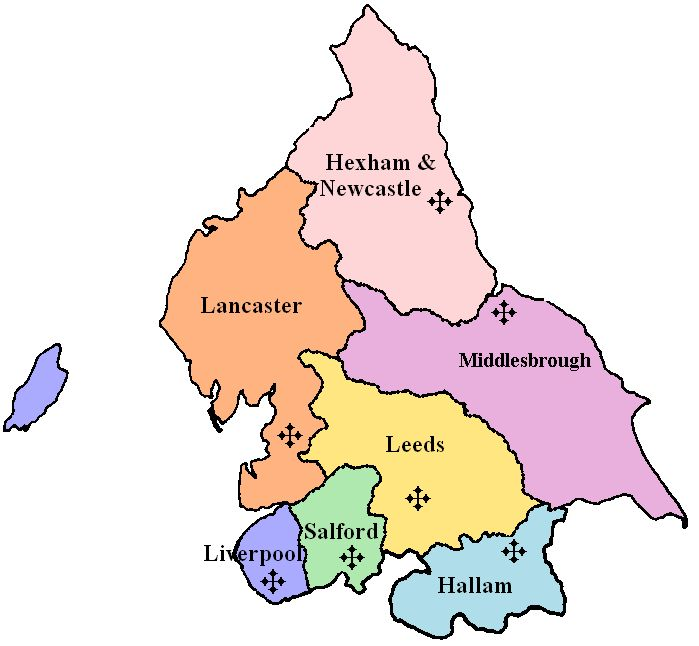
- The Diocese of Hallam within the Province of Liverpool

Website
- hallam-diocese.com

The Diocese of Hallam (Latin: Dioecesis Hallamensis) is a Latin Church ecclesiastical territory or diocese of the Catholic Church in England. The diocese comprises the Metropolitan County of South Yorkshire, including Sheffield and the surrounding towns of Rotherham, Doncaster, and Barnsley, together with the district of Bassetlaw in Nottinghamshire. It also includes Bamford, Chesterfield, Clowne, Dronfield, Eckington, Hathersage, and Staveley in North Derbyshire. It is a suffragan diocese in the ecclesiastical province of the metropolitan Archdiocese of Liverpool.

== Erection of the Diocese ==
The diocese was erected on 30 May 1980 by Pope John Paul II, by removing territory from the Diocese of Leeds and the Diocese of Nottingham. It is one of the six suffragan sees that fall under the ecclesiastical Province of Liverpool (also known as the Northern province).

The diocese derives its name from Hallamshire, an ancient name for the Sheffield area. It is under the patronage of Our Lady of Perpetual Succour, whose feast is celebrated as a solemnity in the diocese on 27 June.

The first Bishop of Hallam was Gerald Moverley, who resigned in July 1996 and died later that year. The second bishop was John Rawsthorne, who had previously been an auxiliary bishop of Liverpool and titular bishop of Rotdon. The Diocese is currently administrated by Bishop Marcus Stock who was appointed apostolic administrator by Pope Leo XIV following the resignation of Ralph Heskett, C.Ss.R., with a look towards possible reunification between the Diocese of Hallam and the Diocese of Leeds.

The diocesan Cathedral is the Cathedral Church of St. Marie in the city centre of Sheffield.

== Deanery structure ==
The parishes included in the Diocese of Hallam are organised into six deaneries.

== Bishops of the Diocese of Hallam ==
Tenure	Incumbent	Notes
3 July 1980 – 9 July 1996	Gerald Moverley	Previously Auxiliary Bishop of Leeds; resigned
3 July 1997 – 20 May 2014	John Rawsthorne	Previously Auxiliary Bishop of Liverpool; installed 4 June 1997; resigned
10 July 2014 – 20 March 2026	Ralph Heskett, C.Ss.R.	Previously Bishop of Gibraltar; appointed 20 May 2014; resigned

== See also ==
- List of Catholic churches in the United Kingdom
