= History of the Maltese in Gibraltar =

Maltese Gibraltarians
- (Malta) (Gibraltar)

Languages
- English, Spanish, Maltese, Llanito

Religion
- Largely Roman Catholic

Related ethnic groups
- Maltese diaspora

A Maltese community has existed in Gibraltar since shortly after its capture by an Anglo-Dutch fleet in 1704. Following the Capture of Gibraltar, most of the existing population elected to leave, leaving behind a small population of around seventy (mainly neutral Genoese people). Immigration from neighboring Spanish towns soon followed, giving Gibraltar a very cosmopolitan population. Years of coexistence and intermarriage on the Rock soon led to a coalescence of Maltese, Italian and Andalusian culture, preserving the Mediterranean and Catholic nature of Gibraltar despite the centuries of British rule.

== Colonialism ==
Gibraltar, Malta and Cyprus were the three stepping stones whereby Great Britain controlled the Mediterranean and the vital route to the Suez Canal and thence to India. Gibraltar prospered with the arrival of 19th century trade with North Africa and the presence of the Royal Navy. This prosperity attracted immigrants from neighbouring Mediterranean lands and in 1885 there were about 1,000 Maltese people living in Gibraltar. Early in the 20th century the British undertook vast naval works and improvements to the existing fortifications of Gibraltar to make the rock practically impregnable. The naval base in Gibraltar was to prove its strategic value in the two world wars. Given the common cultural bond between Malta and Gibraltar, the prospect of lucrative employment spurred further immigration from Malta.

== Maltese in Gibraltar ==
By 1912 the total number of Maltese living in Gibraltar was not above 700. Many worked in the dockyard and others operated businesses which were usually ancillary to the dockyard. However, the economy of Gibraltar was not capable of absorbing a large number of immigrants from Malta and by 1912 the number of Maltese was already in decline as they returned to the Maltese Islands. Eventually those who stayed in Gibraltar became very much involved in the economic and social life in Gibraltar, most of them also being staunch supporters of links with the UK. The situation in Malta was very different, where, despite an earlier attempt at integration with the UK, rising nationalist sentiment led to independence in 1964 and the establishment of a republic a decade later.

== Notable Gibraltarians of Maltese descent ==
- Peter Caruana KC, former Chief Minister of Gibraltar.
- Keith Azopardi KC, current Leader of the Opposition, Leader of the Gibraltar Social Democrats and former Leader of the Progressive Democratic Party.
- Davina Barbara (née Camilleri), former TV presenter of the Gibraltar Broadcasting Corporation.
- Charles Caruana CBE, former bishop of the Roman Catholic Diocese of Gibraltar.
- Georgina Cassar, rhythmic gymnast and 2012 Olympian for Team GB.
- Gerard Teuma, former CEO of the Gibraltar Broadcasting Corporation.
- Maurice Xiberras, former politician, deputy leader of the Integration With Britain Party, deputy Chief Minister 1969–1972, Leader of the Opposition 1972-1979

== See also ==
- Maltese people
- History of the Genoese in Gibraltar
- History of the Jews in Gibraltar
