= Bishop of Hallam =

Roman Catholic ordinary of the Diocese of Hallam in South Yorkshire

- Bishopric

Roman catholic
- Incumbent; Sede vacante

Location
- Ecclesiastical province: Liverpool

Information
- Established: 30 May 1980
- Diocese: Hallam
- Cathedral: St Marie's Cathedral, Sheffield

The Bishop of Hallam is the ordinary of the Roman Catholic Diocese of Hallam in the Province of Liverpool, England.

On 20 May 2014, the Right Reverend Ralph Heskett, C.Ss.R., was appointed the 3rd Bishop of Hallam by Pope Francis. Bishop Heskett had served as Bishop of Gibraltar from 2010 to 2014. Following Heskett's resignation in early 2026, Pope Leo XIV appointed the Right Reverend Marcus Stock as the Apostolic Administrator of the Diocese. These duties would be in addition to Stock's office as Bishop of Leeds and additional responsibilities as the Apostolic Administrator of the Diocese of Middlesbrough, who confirmed that he had been tasked with beginning "a consultation with the clergy, religious and lay faithful of the Diocese of Hallam about a possible reunification with the Diocese of Leeds".

The Diocese of Hallam takes its name after Hallamshire, an historical area of South Yorkshire, and was erected on 30 May 1980 from parts of the dioceses of Leeds and Nottingham. The diocese has an area of 1,030 km^{2} (400 sq mi) and covers the County of South Yorkshire, parts of the High Peak and Chesterfield districts of Derbyshire, and the Bassetlaw District in Nottinghamshire. The see is in the City of Sheffield where the bishop's seat is located at the Cathedral Church of Saint Marie. The bishop's official address is The Diocesan Centre, St. Charles' Street, Sheffield.

== List of the Bishops of Hallam ==
Bishops of Hallam
From	Until	Ordinary	Notes
1980	1996	Gerald Moverley	Formerly an auxiliary bishop of Leeds (1967–1980). Appointed Bishop of Hallam on 30 May 1980. Resigned on 9 July 1996 and died on 14 December 1996.
1997	2014	John Rawsthorne	Formerly an auxiliary bishop of Liverpool (1981–1997). Appointed Bishop of Hallam on 4 June 1997. Retired on 20 May 2014
2014	2026	Ralph Heskett, C.Ss.R.	Formerly Bishop of Gibraltar (2010–2014). Appointed Bishop of Hallam on 20 May 2014.
