= Hexhamshire =

Civil parish and ancient county of England

Coordinates: 54.914°N 2.114°W

- Location within Northumberland
- Population: 685 (Parish, 2021)
- OS grid reference: NY927576
- Unitary authority: Northumberland
- Ceremonial county: Northumberland
- Region: North East
- Country: England
- Sovereign state: United Kingdom
- Post town: HEXHAM
- Postcode district: NE47
- Police: Northumbria
- Fire: Northumberland
- Ambulance: North East
- UK Parliament: Hexham

Hexhamshire is a civil parish in Northumberland, England. The parish covers a largely rural area to the south of the town of Hexham. Settlements in the parish include Juniper and Whitley Chapel. The civil parish was created in 1955 from areas formerly in the ancient parish of Hexham. At the 2021 census, the parish had a population of 685.

Prior to 1572, Hexhamshire was also the name of a county palatine covering a larger area than the modern civil parish. The county palatine also included Hexham and surrounding rural areas including Allendale, and the parish of St John Lee, which had its parish church at Acomb. The county palatine was abolished in 1572, when its area was absorbed into the county of Northumberland.

== History ==
Hexhamshire was originally a single parish based on the church of St Andrew, Hexham, and surveys from 1295, 1547 and 1608 all show that the extent of its territory remained highly stable over time. It was probably formed from the lands gifted in 674 to Wilfrid, the Bishop of York, by the Northumbrian queen Æthelthryth to support the newly established Bishopric of Hexham. As the land was granted as a single block and formed part of the Queen's dowry, it probably constituted a single pre-existing territorial unit.

In 854 the diocese of Hexham was split between the dioceses of Lindisfarne and York, and by 883 the ownership of Hexhamshire had fallen into the hands of the Bishops of Lindisfarne. Government of Hexhamshire by the Provosts or Thegns of the Bishop of Durham, as successors to Lindisfarne, continued throughout the 11th century until 1071, when William the Conqueror's Harrying of the North saw Bishop Æthelwine flee to Lindisfarne, and Uthred, Provost of Hexhamshire, submitted authority over Hexhamshire to Thomas of Bayeux, the Archbishop of York.

The ownership of Hexhamshire by the see of York was confirmed by Henry I, and a regular system of administration was established. Like County Durham, Hexhamshire was a "royal liberty", where the king's writ did not run, and the Archbishop of York enjoyed powers elsewhere held by the king, including complete judicial and administrative authority: pleas of the Crown could be held in his courts, he could hold inquisitions and regulate commercial activity, and he held the exclusive right of taxation. Administration of the territory was conducted by officials appointed by the archbishop, including a bailiff, justices and coroner. Royal officials were rigorously excluded from the territory and it maintained its independence from the royal eyre throughout the 13th century.

Until 1572 Hexhamshire also formed an independent county palatine. Justices of the Peace are recorded from 1358, and leading local families are first recorded being described as "of the county of Hexham" in official documents in 1376 and 1385. In 1408 a Scottish felon arrested for offences in Hexhamshire was released by royal justices on the basis that the acts had occurred "outside the county of Northumberland", and an act of 1482 expressly listed Hexhamshire alongside Cheshire and County Durham as a county palatine where the proceeds of fines did not go to the king.

Hexham Abbey was dissolved in 1537 in the Dissolution of the monasteries, and after a series of local uprisings the Crown took possession of Hexhamshire in 1545. With the liberty in Crown hands its status became increasingly anachronistic, and in 1572 it was formally abolished.

Hexhamshire Act 1572
- Act of Parliament
- Parliament of England
- Long title: An Act for the annexing of Hexham and Hexhamshire to the County of Northumberlande.
- Citation: 14 Eliz. 1. c. 13
- Territorial extent: England and Wales

Dates
- Royal assent: 30 June 1572
- Commencement: 8 May 1572 (Note: Start of session.)
- Repealed: 13 March 1975
Other legislation
Amended by	Justices of the Peace Act 1949
Repealed by	Statute Law (Repeals) Act 1975

Status: Repealed

Text of statute as originally enacted

Hexhamshire was incorporated into Northumberland in 1572 by an act of Parliament, the Hexhamshire Act 1572 (14 Eliz. 1. c. 13) ("An Act for the annexing of Hexhamshire to the Countye of Northumberland"). At the same time, the district was transferred from the see of York to the see of Durham, where it remained until 1837. In 1792, an Act of Parliament was passed for the division of common land in Hexhamshire and Allendale Common

== Parish ==
In modern use, Hexhamshire is the name of a civil parish south of Hexham. The parish covers a large but mostly sparsely populated area, including the villages of Dalton and Whitley Chapel, Broadwell House, and Hexhamshire Common. The civil parish was formed in 1955 by the union of the Hexhamshire High Quarter, Hexhamshire Middle Quarter, and Hexhamshire West Quarter parishes. Hexhamshire Low Quarter, to the north, was merged on 1 April 2011.

== See also ==
- Historic counties of England
- Allertonshire
- Hallamshire
- Howdenshire
- Richmondshire
- Winchcombeshire

== Sources ==
- Hinds, Allen B. (1896). Hexhamshire, Part I. A History of Northumberland. Vol. 3. Newcastle-upon-Tyne: Andrew Reid & Co.
- Holford, Matthew L. (2010). "Hexhamshire and Tynemouthshire". In Holford, Matthew L.; Stringer, Keith J. (eds.). Border Liberties and Loyalties: North-East England, c. 1200 to c. 1400. Edinburgh: Edinburgh University Press. pp. 172–227. ISBN 978-0748632176.
- Smailes, AE (1960). North England. Edinburgh: Thomas Nelson & Sons Ltd.
- Youngs, Frederic A. (1991). Guide to the Local Administrative Units of England. Vol. 2, Northern England. London: Royal Historical Society. ISBN 0861931270.
