= Healey, Northumberland =

Coordinates: 54.921°N 1.978°W

Healey
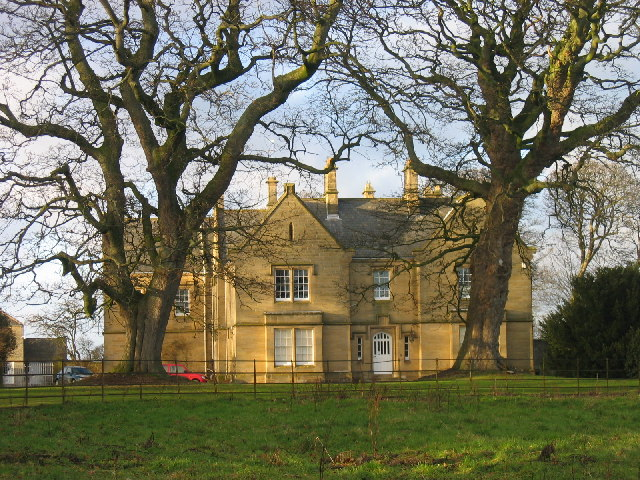
- Healey Hall

- Location within Northumberland
- Population: 191 (2011)
- OS grid reference: NZ0158
- Civil parish: Healey
- Unitary authority: Northumberland
- Ceremonial county: Northumberland
- Region: North East
- Country: England
- Sovereign state: United Kingdom
- Post town: RIDING MILL
- Postcode district: NE44
- Dialling code: 01434
- Police: Northumbria
- Fire: Northumberland
- Ambulance: North East
- UK Parliament: Hexham

Healey is a rural estate and civil parish in Northumberland, England, situated between Riding Mill to the north and Slaley to the south. The neo-Norman St John's Parish Church, which was built in 1860, was awarded the 2011 Art in a Religious Context award for its windows by Anne Vibeke Mou and James Hugonin. At the 2001 census, the parish had a population of 194, falling slightly to 191 at the 2011 Census.

Originally part of the barony of Baliol, Healey was given over to the Knights Templars in the 1260s (hence the area sometimes referred to as Temple Healey). With the suppression of the Templars the land passed to the monarch in 1308 and then shortly after to the Knight Hospitallars. At the dissolution the land returned to the monarch. By the early 1600s the area was held by the Sanderson family. In 1816 the land was sold to Robert Ormston of Newcastle. His son, also called Robert, took down the remains of the peel house and built Healey Hall.

A chapel of ease, St John’s, was built in 1860 to designs by Major C.E. Davis of Bath. The west tower was added in 1890.

The vicarage was built in 1877 from designs by Ewan Christian.

== Governance ==
Healey is in the parliamentary constituency of Hexham.
