= John Rawsthorne =

The Right Reverend John Rawsthorne
- Bishop of Hallam
- Church: Roman Catholic Church
- Province: Liverpool
- Diocese: Hallam
- In office: 4 June 1997 – 20 May 2014
- Predecessor: Gerald Moverley
- Successor: Ralph Heskett
- Previous posts: Auxiliary Bishop of Liverpool (1981–1997); Titular Bishop of Rotdon (1981–1997)

Orders
- Ordination: 16 June 1962 by John Carmel Heenan
- Consecration: 16 December 1981 by Derek John Worlock

Personal details
- Born: 12 November 1936 (age 89) Crosby, Lancashire
- Denomination: Roman Catholic Church

Styles of John Rawsthorne
- Reference style: The Right Reverend
- Spoken style: My Lord
- Religious style: Bishop

John Anthony Rawsthorne (born 12 November 1936) is a retired English Roman Catholic prelate who served as the Bishop of Hallam from 1997 to 2014.

== Early life and education ==
Born in Crosby, Lancashire (now part of Merseyside), he was the eldest child of Harold Rawsthorne (d. 1945) and Miriam Rawsthorne, née Harrop (d. 1989). He has two brothers, Paul and Christopher, and three sisters, Elizabeth, Ann, and Katherine. After attending St. Joseph's College in Upholland, he was ordained to the priesthood on 16 June 1962 by the then Archbishop of Liverpool, John Carmel Heenan.

== Ministry ==
Until 1965, Rawsthorne studied natural sciences, and was then assigned to pastoral work in West Derby, Croxteth, Childwall, and Liverpool; he also worked in religious education. On 9 November 1981, Rawsthorne was appointed an auxiliary bishop of the Archdiocese of Liverpool and titular bishop of Rotdon by Pope John Paul II. He received his episcopal consecration on the following 16 December 1981 from Archbishop Derek Worlock, with bishops Kevin O'Connor and Anthony Hitchen serving as co-consecrators.

== Bishop of Hallam ==
Following the resignation of Bishop Gerald Moverley, Rawsthorne was appointed the second Bishop of Hallam on 4 June 1997. Rawsthorne is a keen walker and takes part in a sponsored walk every year to raise money to support St. Wilfrid's Drop-in Day Centre in Sheffield. He is also an active member of the Catholic Bishops' Conference of England and Wales, especially with education and youth work.

On his 75th birthday in 2011, in accordance with Canon 401 §1 of the Latin Church 1983 Code of Canon Law, Bishop Rawsthorne offered his resignation as Bishop of Hallam to Pope Benedict XVI, but was refused and remained in office for the next three years. On 20 May 2014, it was announced by the Vatican that Pope Francis had appointed the Right Reverend Ralph Heskett, Bishop of Gibraltar to succeed Rawsthorne as Bishop of Hallam.

On his retirement, the Diocese of Hallam drew attention to several important aspects of his ministry and thanked him for his commitment as Bishop "Prominent among his contributions has been the ecumenical and interfaith aspect of his work in which, through the warmth and trust of his relationships with other Faith leaders in the City of Sheffield and beyond, he has been able to provide, with them, a united voice against extremism and have a positive and healing influence."

Catholic Church titles
Preceded by Gerald Moverley	Bishop of Hallam; 1997–2014	Succeeded by Ralph Heskett
