= Gerald Moverley =

First Bishop of the Diocese of Hallam in Yorkshire

The Right Reverend Gerald Moverley
- Bishop of Hallam
- Province: Liverpool
- Diocese: Hallam
- See: Hallam
- Installed: 30 May 1980
- Successor: John Rawsthorne
- Other post: Auxiliary Bishop of the Diocese of Leeds (1967-1980)

Orders
- Ordination: 28 April 1946
- Consecration: 6 December 1967 by Bishop Gordon Wheeler

Personal details
- Born: 9 April 1922 Bradford
- Died: 14 December 1996 (aged 74)
- Denomination: Roman Catholic

Styles of Gerald Moverley
- Reference style: The Right Reverend
- Spoken style: My Lord
- Religious style: Bishop
- Posthumous style: not applicable

Gerald Moverley (9 April 1922 - 14 December 1996) was the first Bishop of the Diocese of Hallam in Yorkshire from 30 May 1980 until July 1996 when he resigned due to ill health.

Born in Bradford, England, Gerald Moverley was ordained priest on 28 April 1946, aged 24, in Leeds.

Moverley earned a Doctorate of Canon Law at the Pontifical University of Saint Thomas Aquinas, Angelicum in 1954

Moverley was consecrated by Bishop William Gordon Wheeler. On 6 December 1967, aged 45, he was appointed Auxiliary Bishop of Leeds and Titular Bishop of Tinis in Proconsulari.

He died in 1996 as Bishop Emeritus of Hallam and was succeeded by Rt. Rev. John Rawsthorne on 3 July 1997.

He had been a priest for 50 years and a bishop for almost 29 years.

Religious titles
Preceded by new Bishopric created	Bishop of Hallam; 1980–1996	Succeeded by John Rawsthorne
