= Howdenshire =

Former administrative division of Yorkshire, England

Coordinates: 53.738°N 0.815°W

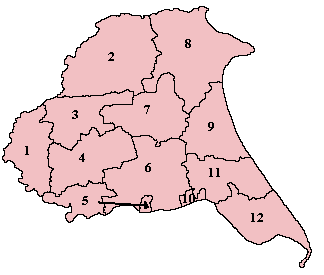
Wapentakes of the East Riding of Yorkshire. Howdenshire is marked 5.

Howdenshire was a wapentake and a liberty of England, lying around the town of Howden in the East Riding of Yorkshire.

In the Anglo-Saxon period, the district was under the control of Peterborough's monastery, but it was confiscated by Edward the Confessor, and then given to the Bishop of Durham by William I of England. It came to operate as an exclave of County Durham, much like Allertonshire, but under the dean of Durham rather than the bishop. This peculiarity was abolished in 1846, but the district is still in use for certain administrative purposes.

== See also ==
- Allertonshire
- Hallamshire
- Hullshire
- Winchcombeshire
