= Ralph Heskett =

English Catholic bishop (born 1953)

The Right Reverend Ralph Heskett C.Ss.R.
- Bishop of Hallam
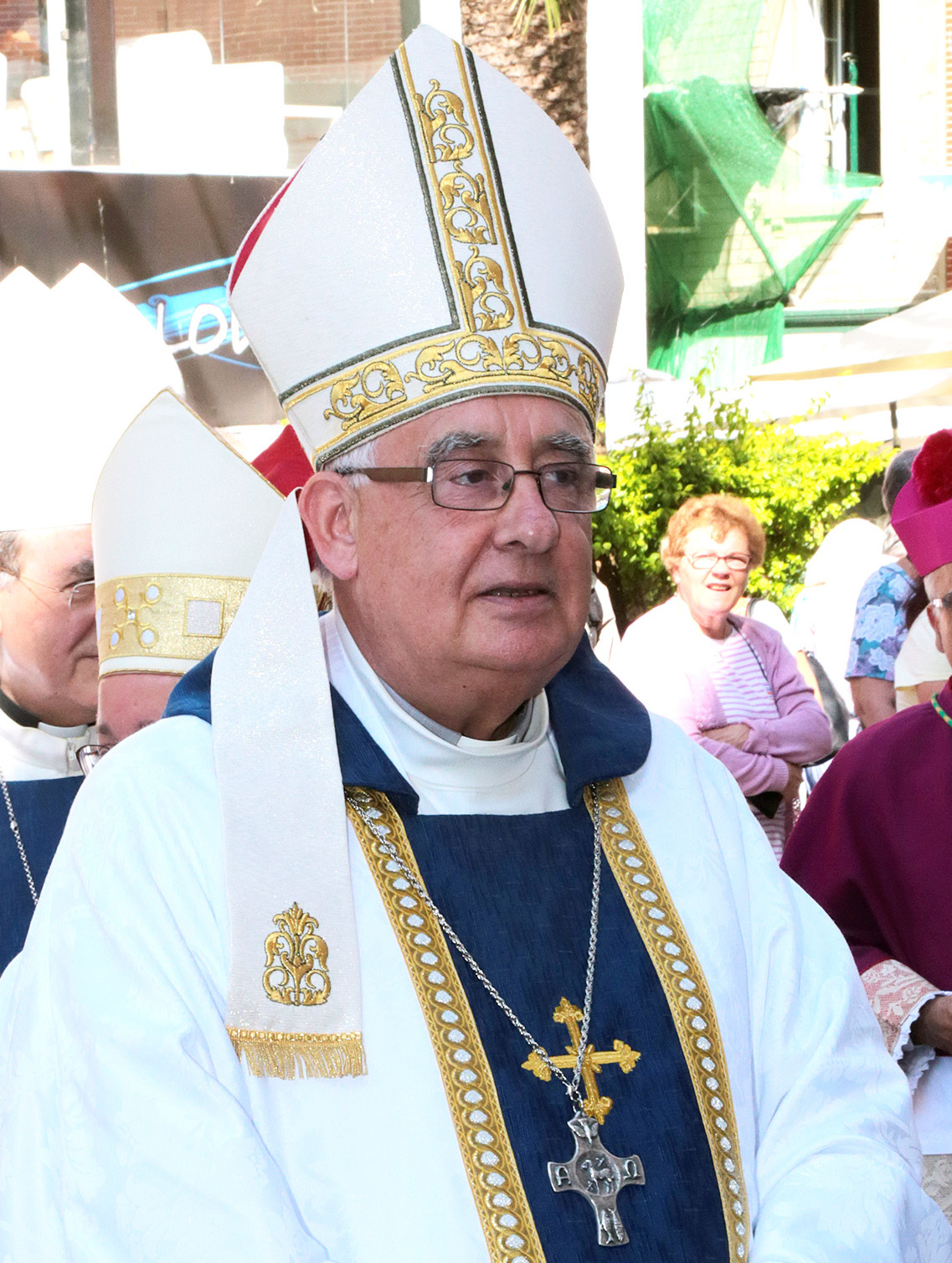
- Heskett in Gibraltar in 2016
- Church: Roman Catholic Church
- Province: Liverpool
- Diocese: Hallam
- Appointed: 20 May 2014
- Installed: 10 July 2014
- Term ended: 20 March 2026
- Predecessor: John Rawsthorne
- Previous posts: Bishop of Gibraltar, 2010-2014

Orders
- Ordination: 10 July 1976 by Hugh Lindsay
- Consecration: 10 July 2010 by Michael Bowen

Personal details
- Born: 3 March 1953 (age 73) Sunderland, County Durham, England
- Denomination: Roman Catholic

Styles of Ralph Heskett C.Ss.R.
- Reference style: The Right Reverend
- Spoken style: My Lord
- Religious style: Bishop

Ralph Heskett C.Ss.R. (born 3 March 1953) is an English Roman Catholic prelate who was the Bishop of Hallam from July 2014 to March 2026, having immediately before that been Bishop of Gibraltar from 2010 to 2014.

== Early life and ministry ==
Hesket was born in Sunderland in England. He was educated at Saint Aidan's Grammar School, Sunderland, a Christian Brothers school, from 1964 to 1969. He was a seminarian from 1969 to 1970 at the Redemptorist order's minor seminary in Birmingham. He was subsequently a novice of the order in Perth, Scotland.

On 21 August 1971 he began his theological studies at Hawkstone Hall and Canterbury. He was ordained as a priest on 10 July 1976 at St Benet's Church, Monkwearmouth, Sunderland. After ordination he worked in Scotland until 1980 and then England until 1984. From 1987 to 1990 he was the Redemptorist order's superior and the pastor of Our Lady of the Annunciation at Bishop Eton, Liverpool.

From 1997 to 1999 he studied at All Hallows College. He was parish priest at St Mary's Roman Catholic Church, Clapham from 1999 to 2008.

== Episcopate ==
He was appointed the bishop of the Diocese of Gibraltar by Pope Benedict XVI on 18 March 2010. His consecration to the episcopate took place on 10 July 2010; the principal consecrator was the Most Reverend Michael George Bowen, Archbishop Emeritus of Southwark, with the Right Reverend Charles Caruana, Bishop Emeritus of Gibraltar, and the Right Reverend Thomas Matthew Burns, Bishop of Menevia, as co-consecrators.

Heskett was appointed bishop of the Diocese of Hallam by Pope Francis on 20 May 2014, and installed during a Mass on 10 July 2014. On 20th March 2026, Heskett asked Pope Leo XIV if he could resign on the grounds of declining health, the pope accepted Heskett's resignation and appointed Bishop Marcus Stock as Apostolic Administrator of Hallam.

Catholic Church titles
| Preceded by Charles Caruana | Bishop of Gibraltar; 2010–2014 | Succeeded by Carmelo Zammit |
| Preceded by John Rawsthorne | Bishop of Hallam; 2014–present | Incumbent |
