= Allertonshire =

Former administrative division of Yorkshire, England

Coordinates: 54.338°N 1.429°W

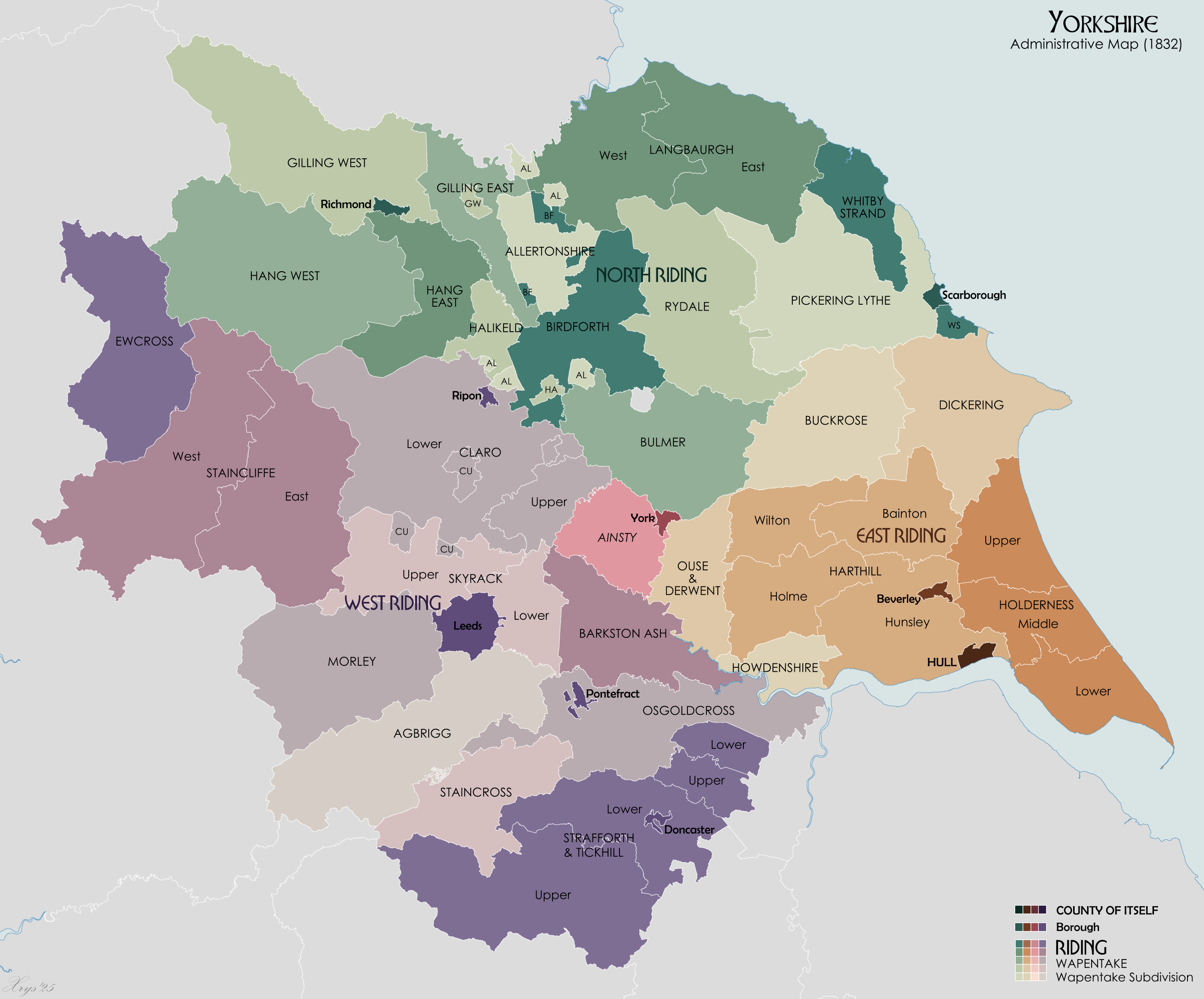
- Map of the wapentakes of Yorkshire in 1832. Allertonshire, including its exclaves, is shown in pale green in the north-centre of the map.
- Status: wapentake, liberty

Allertonshire or Allerton was a wapentake and liberty in the North Riding of Yorkshire, England.

Northallerton, current name of Allerton, was historically associated with the Bishopric of Durham, being an ecclesiastical peculiar and exclave until the 19th century.

The shire's central location in the North Riding (1889–1974) and its successor North Yorkshire (1974–present) allowed the town to become the administrative centre for both counties.

The contiguous part of the wapentake included the ancient parishes of:

- Birkby
- Kirby Sigston
- Leake
- Northallerton
- Osmotherley
- North Otterington
- Thornton-le-Street

The wapentake also included exclaves of:

- the extra parochial area of Hutton Conyers
- the parish of West Rounton
- the parish of Sessay
- the Yorkshire part of the parish of Sockburn (townships of Girsby and Over Dinsdale)

The wapentake also included part of the parish of Kirklington, including the vill of Howgrave.

== See also ==
- Hallamshire
- Howdenshire
- Hullshire
- Winchcombeshire
