= Whitley Chapel =

Coordinates: 54.912°N 2.119°W

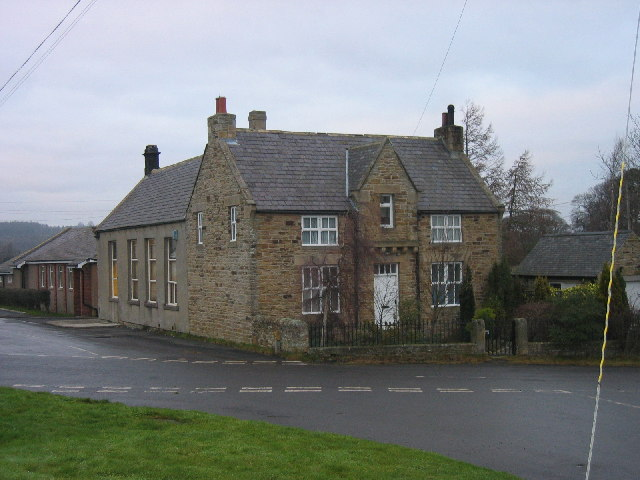

- Location within Northumberland
- OS grid reference: NY925575
- Shire county: Northumberland
- Region: North East
- Country: England
- Sovereign state: United Kingdom
- Post town: HEXHAM
- Postcode district: NE47
- Police: Northumbria
- Fire: Northumberland
- Ambulance: North East
- UK Parliament: Hexham

Whitley Chapel is a village in Northumberland, England about 4 miles (6 km) south of Hexham, and in the parish of Hexhamshire.

== Governance ==
Whitley Chapel is in the parliamentary constituency of Hexham.

== Landmarks ==
In Whitley Chapel Village Hall is a plaque commemorating those fallen soldiers from Hexhamshire killed in battle during the two world wars. Local historian and publisher Hilary Kristensen was behind the idea and the plaque is the fruit of nearly three years' work. The plaque was unveiled in 2009 by Hilary Kristensen, Mike Linklater and parish council chairman Brian Massey.

The names recorded on the plaque are:

The Great War
John Atkinson	William Dagg	Robert Leathard
Surtees Atkinson	Joseph Davison	Dent Oliver
James I. Bowman	John Henderson	James H. Robson
Thomas Brown	George Holden	Joseph W. Simpson
Cecil P. Clark	William Kennedy	Harry J. Spencer
World War II
Fred Armstrong	Leonard Atkinson	Eric Robson
John S. Atkinson	Robert N. Atkinson	Vincent J. Swallow
Walter R. Dawson

== Religious sites ==
The church is dedicated to St Helen. The church was built in 1742 on the site of a medieval church. Renovations in the nineteenth century.
