= Winchcombeshire =

Former county in western England

Coordinates: 51.953°N 1.968°W

Winchcombeshire was an ancient county in the south west of England, in the Anglo-Saxon period, with Winchcombe as its county town. The county originated in the shiring of Mercia in the tenth or early eleventh centuries, perhaps by King Edward the Elder in the early 920s. It was merged into Gloucestershire in the early eleventh century, probably by King Cnut in 1017.

== See also ==
- Hexhamshire
- Allertonshire
- Hallamshire
- Howdenshire
- Richmondshire
