= Hallamshire =

Historical district of Yorkshire, England

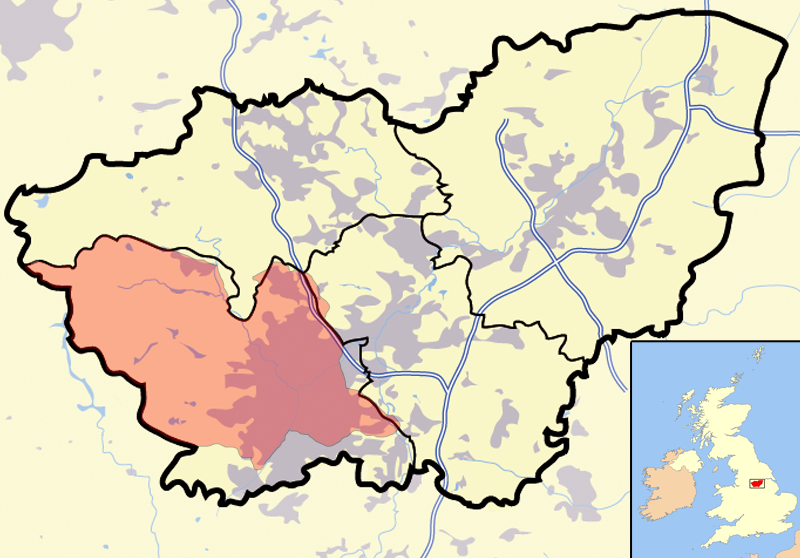
Map showing the approximate area of Hallamshire as described in the 14th century (red shaded area) overlaid on a map of the modern ceremonial county of South Yorkshire

Hallamshire (or Hallam) is the historical name for an area of South Yorkshire, England, approximating to the current City of Sheffield local government area.

The origin of the name is uncertain. The English Place-Name Society describe Hallam originating from a formation meaning 'on the rocks'. Alternative theories are that it is derived from halgh meaning an area of land at a border, Old Norse hallr meaning a slope or hill, or Old English heall meaning a hall or mansion.

The exact boundaries of this historic district are unknown, but it is thought to have covered the parishes of Sheffield, Ecclesfield, and Bradfield — an area roughly equivalent to those parts of the present-day borough of the City of Sheffield that lie to the west of the rivers Don and Sheaf that are within the boundaries of the ancient county of Yorkshire (later descriptions also include Brightside and the parish of Handsworth).

== History ==
=== Pre-conquest Hallamshire ===
Sites proposed as the location for Waltheof's aula shown within Sheffield

In Anglo-Saxon times, Hallamshire was the most southerly of the "small shires" or regiones of the Kingdom of Northumbria.

The mother church of Hallamshire lay five miles north of Sheffield at Ecclesfield, whose placename includes the Common Brittonic or primitive Welsh root *eglẽs meaning "church", suggesting that Hallamshire has even earlier roots and must have existed as a territorial unit at the time of the area's first conversion to Christianity during the Romano-British period.

On the basis of three separate extracts from the Domesday Survey it can be shown that the manors of Hallam, Attercliffe, and Sheffield were three distinct and separate entities at the time of the Survey and beyond. The Domesday Book of 1086 states that the manor of Hallam ("Hallun") included sixteen hamlets or settlements and had existed before the 1066 Norman Conquest of England as part of the lands owned by Waltheof, the Earl of Huntingdon, who had an aula or hall located in the manor of Hallam. From the Domesday text it is clear that the village of Hallam and Waltheof’s aula could only have been located in the manor of Hallam, and not the manors of Sheffield or Attercliffe. However, the possibility that Waltheof's aula and the surrounding settlement was located in the manor of Sheffield still persists since the manor of Sheffield had once been demesne or inland of the manor of Hallam, a term which in this case implies "contained within". This has led to the suggestion that the Sheffield of the Domesday Book somehow encompassed the area that later became known as Sheffield Park, the historic town and castle being in Hallam. Indeed, an early 20th-century excavation at the site of Sheffield Castle found evidence of an Anglo-Saxon building on the site. However, alternative sites have been suggested in and around the Rivelin valley.

Local historian T. Walter Hall (in 1931), following Sidney Addy (1893), suggested that the district's original settlement was at Hallam Head, above the River Rivelin, and that it had been destroyed during the Harrying of the North. As evidence, he noted that the location lies by the ancient Long Causeway route and that the name of the neighbouring Burnt Stones Common referenced its destruction. A compilation of early maps of the area surrounding Hallam Head assembled by Hallam (2015) from a number of sources provides compelling evidence that a pre-Conquest nucleated settlement, almost assuredly the Domesday village of Hallam, was located immediately south of the old Roman road (Redmires Road) approximately 2.8 miles (4.5 km) west of Sheffield. The geographic centre coincides with the junction of Tom Lane and Carsick Hill Road; two ancient byways found mentioned in medieval charters from the 13th century. Hallam provides corroborating charter evidence that leads to the identification of the location Hallam Head, the site for the village of Hallam identified by T. Walter Hall in 1931, being situated near the upper end, or head of the village. A series of three communal fields designated Hallam fields (Hallam Field, Great Hallam Field and Common Fields of Hallam) are mentioned frequently in surrenders from 1550 onward in the context of common pasture. The apparent pattern of a nucleated settlement and associated three-field system would be analogous to ‘town planning’ without a town, had the village of Hallam not existed. The arguments presented by T. Walter Hall and Hallam are rejected by David Hey, who notes that there is no evidence of any settlement larger than a hamlet ever having existed at the site, and that evidence suggests that the Harrying of the North did not affect the Sheffield area. The simple fact that the village of Hallam and Waltheof's aula had been destroyed and no longer existed, and that the taxable value of the manors in the area had been significantly devalued by the time of the Domesday Survey would contradict Hay's position. Addy himself preferred a location just outside the village of Stannington, where there is evidence of a large manor house surrounded by a moat.

=== After the Norman Conquest ===
Waltheof initially submitted to William I and was allowed to keep his lands. He took part in a failed uprising to support the 1069 invasion by Sweyn II of Denmark and Edgar Ætheling (including an attack on York), but then once again submitted to William and was married to Judith of Lens, the King's niece. However, after taking part in a conspiracy against William in 1075 Waltheof was executed.

Initially, Judith retained his lands (including Hallamshire), but after Judith refused a second marriage to the Norman knight Simon Saint Liz, William confiscated much of her lands and handed them to her eldest daughter Maud, who then married Saint Liz in Judith's stead. After the death of Saint Liz, Maud married David, the heir to the crown of Scotland, and Waltheof's lands and Earldom were passed to him.

It is possible that Hallamshire was exempted from this transfer and remained in Judith's hands. The Domesday Book states that the manor of Hallam was held by Roger de Busli "of the Countess Judith". The exact nature of the arrangement between Judith and de Busli is unknown, however there is evidence that such an arrangement continued for a number of centuries – an inquisition following the death of Thomas de Furnival in 1332 found that his ancestors had held the manor of Sheffield "of the King of Scotland", paying a yearly service of two white greyhounds.

The earliest known use of the term Hallamshire – "Halumsire" – is found in a deed of the house of Saint Wandrille in Ecclesfield dating from 1161. Historically, the term shire would simply mean the district appropriated to some city, town, or castle, and did not necessarily refer to a county. Hallamshire could therefore be assumed to be the district associated with a town ("vill") called "Hallam", although there is no known record of such a town's existence.

During this early period, the name Hallamshire was retained for the Norman lordship. It was administered from Sheffield Castle, at the confluence of the River Don and the River Sheaf. A smaller castle was built at High Bradfield. During the 12th century, William de Lovetot acquired most of the land within the Sheffield area including the old manors of Hallam, Sheffield, and Attercliffe. He constructed a more substantial castle in Sheffield, establishing the town as the dominant settlement within Hallamshire. Sheffield gained a sizeable parish, split from the large parish of Ecclesfield, and a larger manor which encompassed most of Hallamshire. A charter of 1268 describes Hallamshire as containing just three manors: Ecclesfield, Sheffield and Bradfield. However, confusion arose later, as Sheffield acquired other manors outside historic Hallamshire, such as that of Handsworth.

Hallamshire was included in official lists of the counties of England under Henry VIII in the 16th century.

The territorial division of Hallamshire survived into the 19th century as a liberty, recorded in 1822 as including the parishes of Sheffield, Treeton, Whiston, Rotherham, Handsworth, and Ecclesfield, and with the Duke of Norfolk as Chief Bailiff.

=== Modern Hallam ===
Hallam has come to mean, broadly speaking, that area of Yorkshire in the foothills of the Peak District and southwest of the River Don. The region includes much of western Sheffield, and the parish of Bradfield. Suburbs and villages within this area include Bradfield, Broomhill, Crookes, Fulwood, Hillsborough, Loxley, Stannington, Strines, and Walkley.

A number of institutions, companies, and public houses use the "Hallam/shire" name to reflect their association with the Sheffield area :

- The Company of Cutlers in Hallamshire is a trade guild of steelworkers, founded in 1624 and based in Sheffield.
- Sheffield Hallam is a Parliamentary constituency in western Sheffield, demographically one of the wealthiest such constituencies in Britain.
- Hallamshire was a Parliamentary constituency from 1885 to 1918
- The Diocese of Hallam is a Roman Catholic diocese in England, covering South Yorkshire, northern Derbyshire and northern Nottinghamshire. Its mother church is the Cathedral Church of St Marie in Sheffield.
- Royal Hallamshire Hospital is a large hospital in the Broomhill district of Sheffield.
- The Criminal Justice Administration Act 1962 created a judicial county of Hallamshire and the office of High Sheriff of Hallamshire. Both were abolished in 1974.
- The Hallamshire Battalion was the unit of Territorial Force volunteers for the York and Lancaster Regiment. Otherwise known as the 4th Battalion, it fought in the First World War and in the Second World War. Unusually, but appropriately, it fought in the same formation in both wars. This was the 49th (West Riding) Infantry Division
- Sheffield Hallam University is one of the two universities in the City of Sheffield. Created when Sheffield City Polytechnic became a university in 1992, it took the name Hallam to distinguish it from the pre-existing University of Sheffield.
- Hallam FM was the name of a local radio station which broadcasts in Sheffield, Rotherham, Doncaster, and Barnsley. Now called Hits Radio South Yorkshire.
- The Hallam Line is a railway line that runs from Sheffield to Leeds via Barnsley.
- Hallam Cricket Club at Hallam Head is one of the oldest in the North of England, earliest records dating from 1804.
- Hallam F.C. was formed from it in 1860 and still plays on the same ground, making it the oldest football club ground in the world.
- Hallamshire Golf Club, founded in 1897.
- Sheffield & Hallamshire FA expands over the wide area, stretching into West Yorkshire to include teams from South Elmsall and Nostell and into Nottinghamshire to include teams from Worksop.
- Hallamshire Harriers Sheffield Athletics Club, one of two major athletics clubs in the city.
- The Hallamshire Lodge, freemasons lodge at Tapton Hall, Sheffield.
- The Hallam Tower in the Fulwood area of Sheffield, formerly a hotel.
- Hallam Primary School is a primary school in the Lodge Moor area of Sheffield.
- The Hallamshire House is a pub operated by Thornbridge Brewery in the Crookesmoor area of Sheffield.
- Hallamshire RUFC, one of Sheffield's amateur rugby union teams. They play at the Bolehill Recreation Ground.

== Connection to the Robin Hood legend ==
The small village of Loxley, now a suburb of western Sheffield, lies within Hallamshire. A 1637 survey by John Harrison of the estates in or near Sheffield belonging to the Earl of Arundel states that a place called little Haggas croft in Loxley Firth contained "the foundacion of a house or cottage where Robin Hood was born". Antiquarian Joseph Hunter—writing in 1819—reaffirmed this local tradition, stating that Loxley Chase has "the fairest pretensions to be the Locksley of our old ballads, where was born that redoubtable hero Robin Hood."

== See also ==
- History of Sheffield
- History of Yorkshire
- List of hundreds of England and Wales
- Allertonshire
- Burghshire
- Hallam, Pennsylvania
- Hexhamshire
- Howdenshire
- Richmondshire
- Winchcombeshire

== References and notes ==
- Addy, The Hall of Waltheof, Chapter XXXV. The Stannington Diploma—The Stone Villa—The Hall

== Bibliography ==
- Addy, Sidney Oldall (1888). A Glossary of Words Used in the Neighbourhood of Sheffield. Including a Selection of Local Names, and Some Notices of Folk-Lore, Games, and Customs. London: Trubner & Co. for the English Dialect Society. (wikisource)
- Addy, Sidney Oldall (1893). The Hall of Waltheof. Sheffield: William Townsend and Son. OCLC 12239309. (wikisource)
- Barrow, G. W. S. (2003) [1973]. "Pre-feudal Scotland: shires and thanes". The Kingdom of the Scots: Government, Church and Society from the Eleventh to the Fourteenth Century. Edinburgh: Edinburgh University Press. pp. 7–56. ISBN 0748618031.
- Hunter, Joseph (1819). Hallamshire. The History and Topography of the Parish of Sheffield in the County of York. London: Lackington, Hughes, Harding, Mayor & Jones. (wikisource)
- Langdale, Thomas (1822). A Topographical Dictionary of Yorkshire. Northallerton: J. Langdale.
