= Juniper, Northumberland =

Hamlet in Northumberland, England

Coordinates: 54.921°N 2.103°W

Juniper
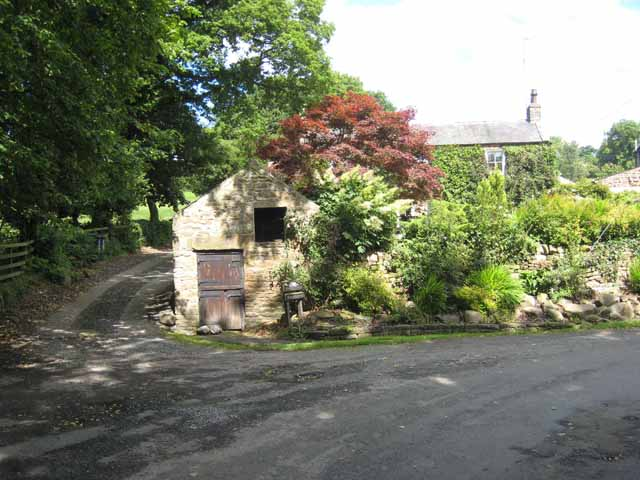
- Peth Head Cottage, Juniper village

- Location within Northumberland
- OS grid reference: NY935585
- Unitary authority: Northumberland
- Ceremonial county: Northumberland
- Region: North East
- Country: England
- Sovereign state: United Kingdom
- Post town: HEXHAM
- Postcode district: NE47
- Police: Northumbria
- Fire: Northumberland
- Ambulance: North East
- UK Parliament: Hexham

Juniper is a hamlet in the English county of Northumberland.

It is about 5 miles (8 km) due south of Hexham in the area known as Hexhamshire.

There is a Wesleyan Methodist chapel (now converted to holiday accommodation) and dated 1894. In nearby Dye Houses there is another Methodist chapel (Primitive) originally built 1830 and rebuilt in 1865.

Nearby Black Hall is a listed building dating from 1714 with mid-19th century and 1930s additions.

== Governance ==
Juniper is in the parliamentary constituency of Hexham.

== Proposed change of name ==
As an April Fools' Day joke, in April 2010 the Hexham Courant reported the following:

A Hexhamshire hamlet is changing its name in order to cash in on the millions of a sixties superstar. The tiny community of Juniper will in future be known as Jennifer Juniper, following a request from hippy Hero Donovan. Cash-strapped Northumberland County Council is understood to have agreed to the name change in return for a £5 million donation to council coffers. The denim-decked singer made a fortune in the 1960s from songs like Catch the wind, Universal Soldier, Mellow Yellow and Sunshine Superman, but his personal favourite was always Jennifer Juniper. He took a tour of Tynedale whilst staying at Slaley Hall and fell in love with the quaint hamlet of Juniper. He spotted a dappled mare grazing in a field and just wanted to be part of the place. Villagers have reported being offered large wads of cash for their properties but no-one was prepared to move out of the close-knit community. A consultation exercise on the name change is being carried out by the county council, but comments had to be in by noon yesterday.
