= Imperial fortress =

One of four key British colonial military outposts

1821 map of the heavily fortified city of Valletta, Malta and its two harbours (Grand Harbour and Marsamxett), an important Royal Navy base in the 19th and 20th centuries

Imperial fortresses were certain territories of the British Empire which provided safe habours for the Royal Navy. Lord Salisbury described Malta, Gibraltar, Bermuda, and Halifax as Imperial fortresses at the 1887 Colonial Conference, though by that point they had been so designated for decades. Later historians have also given the title "imperial fortress" to St. Helena and Mauritius, despite their lacking naval dockyards and not serving as home bases for station naval squadrons.

The fortresses provided safe harbours, coal stores, and dockyards to protect and supply Royal Navy warships. They had numbers of soldiers sufficient not only for local defence, but also to provide expeditionary forces to work with the Royal Navy, as well as stockpiles of military supplies.

== History ==
Although the War Office took over from local officials the funding and operational control of auxiliary forces in the British Isles from 1871 onwards, the trend of Imperial defence policy during the course of the 19th century was to remove regular units of the British Army from colonial garrison duty wherever strategic concerns did not require their retention (this included disbanding colonial regular units of the British Army, other than the West India Regiment and the local-service sub-unit of the Royal Artillery that would ultimately be titled the Royal Malta Artillery, though others would later be raised), with local governments expected to organise and fund auxiliary forces for local defence (although these forces would ultimately be controlled by the Imperial government via colonial Governors, most of whom were civilians, acting as military commanders-in-chief). The main exceptions were the four Imperial fortresses, which the regular army continued to garrison, and within which the part-time militia and volunteer units were funded as parts of the British Army and brigaded with regular units. The 1887 Colonial Conference sat in London from April 4 until May 9, 1887. At the conference, it was asserted that:

In order that the Royal Navy might in practice be ubiquitous, it was essential that certain bases and coaling stations should be provided with shore defences. "In addition to the Imperial fortresses Malta, Gibraltar, Bermuda, and Halifax, it would seem necessary to defend on an adequate scale, Cape Town and Simon's Bay, St. Helena, Sierra Leone, Port Louis (Mauritius), Aden, Colombo (Ceylon), Singapore, Hong Kong, Port Royal (Jamaica), Port Castries (St. Lucia), and Esquimalt, in addition to minor coaling stations . . ." The imperial fortresses would remain a responsibility of the United Kingdom; but in the case of certain colonies in which local as well as imperial interests seemed to require that naval bases be maintained, the government of the United Kingdom thought that the cost should be shared..

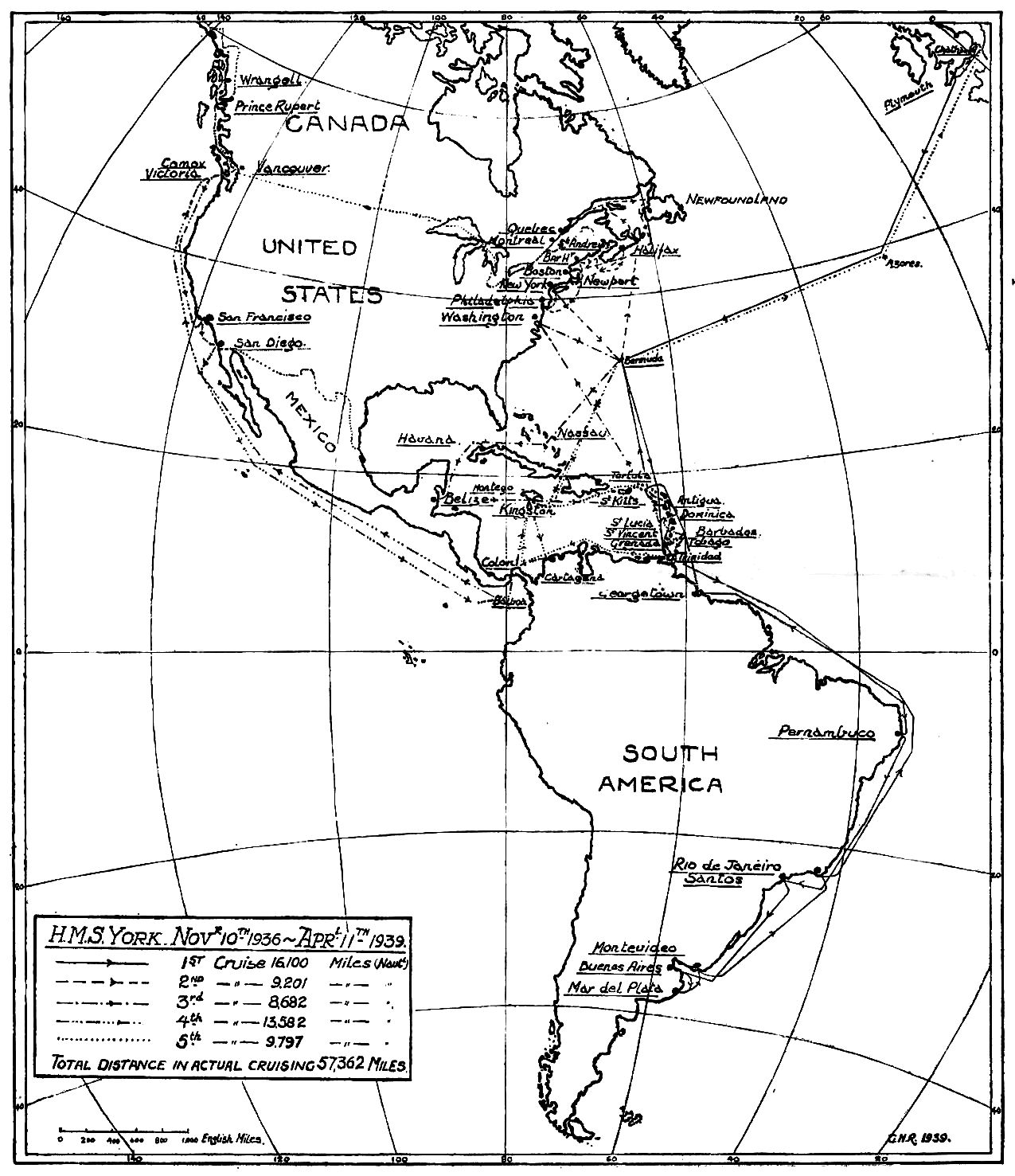
Map of the cruises of the Bermuda-based HMS York on the America & West Indies Station, 1936-1939

Halifax and Bermuda controlled the transatlantic sea lanes between North America and Europe, and were placed to dominate the Atlantic seaboard of the United States (as demonstrated during the American War of 1812, when the squadron of the Royal Navy's North America Station maintained a blockade of the Atlantic coast of the United States and launched the Chesapeake Campaign from Bermuda, defeating American forces at Bladensburg, burning Washington, DC, and raiding Alexandria, Virginia, before ultimately being defeated at Baltimore and forced to withdraw back to Bermuda), as well as to control the western Atlantic Ocean from the Arctic to the West Indies. In 1828, Royal Navy Purser Richard Cotter wrote of Bermuda:

The possession of Bermuda, as the key of all our Western Colonies, is of the first importance to England, for if a foe of any maritime strength had possession of it, our trade would be exposed to much annoyance, if not total destruction.

Gibraltar controlled passage between the Atlantic Ocean and the Mediterranean Sea, and Malta, aside from supporting operations in the Mediterranean and Black Sea, served as a base for naval and military forces that would be able to deploy relatively quickly to the Indian and Pacific Oceans once the Suez Canal was completed in 1869.

Halifax ceased to be an Imperial fortress in stages. With the 1867 confederation of the Dominion of Canada (under which all of the colonies of the British Empire's administrative region of British North America, except Bermuda and Newfoundland, were "federally united into One Dominion under the Crown of the United Kingdom of Great Britain and Ireland, with a Constitution similar in Principle to that of the United Kingdom ..."), military defence of Canada would be transferred to the militia of the dominion government, and the British Army withdrew most of its establishment from the continent, leaving small military garrisons to defend the Royal Naval Dockyard at Halifax, Nova Scotia and the Esquimalt Royal Navy Dockyard in British Columbia. These garrisons were withdrawn along with the Royal Navy establishments when the two Canadian dockyards were closed in 1905, then sold to the government of the dominion.

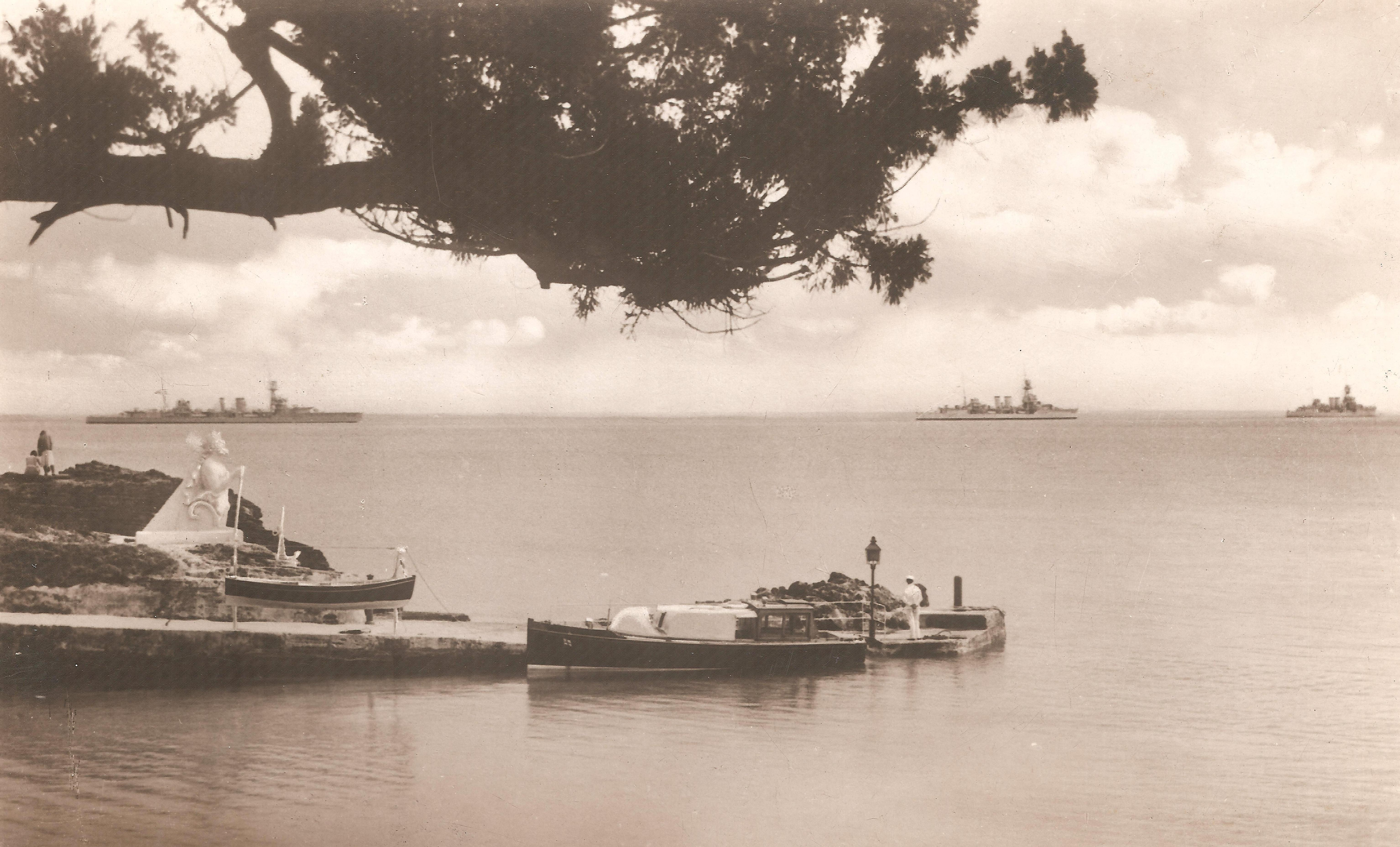
America and West Indies Station 1st Division (HMS Dragon, HMS Danae and HMS Despatch) off Admiralty House in 1931 as they depart their base at the Royal Naval Dockyard in Bermuda to exercise on the open North Atlantic

When the Panama Canal opened in 1914, Britain was able to rely on amity and common interests between herself and the United States during and after the First World War, to use Bermuda also as a base from which cruisers could patrol the Pacific coasts of North, Central, and South America (the first Bermuda-based ship to pass through the canal being HMS Chatham in 1920). The perception that the only navies that could threaten British control of the sealanes or territory around the globe were all those of countries on the Atlantic or its connected seas had meant Imperial fortresses were only established in this region. This was despite the growth of the Pacific Ocean fleets of Russia and the United States of America during the 19th Century.

Finally the rising power and increasing belligerence of the Japanese empire after the First World War (The Imperial Japanese Navy was the third largest navy in the world by 1920, behind the Royal Navy and the United States Navy) would result in the construction of the Singapore Naval Base, which was completed in 1938, less than four years before hostilities with Japan commenced during the Second World War.

The need to protect these bases of operation, as well as to prevent, via their captures, their becoming bases of similar utility to an enemy (with ownership of land by foreigners, at least in Bermuda, barred in order to deny a pretext for invasion), each was heavily defended, making fortress an apt designation. "Fortress" was often included when giving the names of these colonies, e.g. "Fortress Bermuda". Bermuda, protected by an almost impassable barrier reef and unconnected to any continent, required the least defences, but was heavily garrisoned and armed with coastal artillery batteries. Defence of Bermuda, and of the region, was greatly weakened by the economic austerity that followed the conclusion of the Napoleonic Wars and the American War of 1812, which resulted in drastic reductions to the regular forces and to Reserve Forces in the British Isles (Militia, Volunteer Force, and Fencibles), and in Bermuda (Militia and volunteer artillery), being allowed to lapse. Bermuda's garrison would slowly increase, with the threat of invasion by the United States during and after the American Civil War resulting in further strengthening of the defences. Bermuda's importance to Imperial defence was only increasing, however.

Halifax was much more vulnerable to attack than Bermuda, which might come over land or water from the United States, Gibraltar was vulnerable to overland attack by Spain (which remains anxious to recover it) and by Napoleonic France, and both Gibraltar and Malta were much more vulnerable to the navies of the Mediterranean (notably those of Spain, France, Italy, and the Ottoman Empire), and were even more heavily defended.

== Naval and military establishments of the imperial fortresses ==
Imperial fortresses of the British Empire

=== Bermuda ===
- North America and West Indies Station Royal Navy establishment in Bermuda
  - Admiralty House, Bermuda
    - Rose Hill, St. George's Parish (1795 to 1810)
    - Mount Wyndham, Hamilton Parish (1810 to 1816)
    - St. John's Hill (renamed Clarence Hill in 1822), Pembroke Parish (1816 to 1956)
  - Royal Naval Dockyard Bermuda, and the history of the Royal Navy in Bermuda 1795–1995.
    - Convict Bay
    - Admiralty Island (now Hen Island)
    - Daniel's Head wireless station (formerly used by British Army. Later became Royal Canadian Navy NRS Bermuda. See both below)
    - Royal Naval Air Station Bermuda
    - Corps of Colonial Marines. 1814–1816.
    - Bermuda Sea Cadet Corps
- Established by Canadian naval forces
  - HMCS Somers Isles 1944–1945
  - NRS Bermuda (renamed CFS Bermuda) (see Royal Navy Daniel's Head wireless station, above)
- North America Command
- Nova Scotia Command
- Bermuda Garrison (or Bermuda Command after Confederation of Canada). 1701–1957.
  - St. George's Garrison (Eastern District Headquarters)
    - Ordnance Island
    - Royal Army Service Corps Wharf (St. George's)
    - St. George's Armoury
    - East Coast Forts (St. George's, Paget, Governor's, and St. David's Islands)
      - Fort St. Catherine's
      - Fort Victoria
      - Fort Albert
      - Western Redoubt
      - Fort George
      - Town Cut Battery (or Gates' Fort)
      - Alexandra Battery
      - Fort Cunningham
      - Fort Popple
      - Paget Fort
      - Smith's Fort
      - Peniston's Redoubt
      - St. David's Battery
    - Castle Islands Fortifications
      - Devonshire Redoubt
      - Landward Fort
      - King's Castle (Queen's Castle, The Castle, or Seaward Fort)
      - Southampton Fort (or Brangman's Fort)
      - Charles' Fort
      - Martello Tower
      - Burnt Point Fort
      - Ferry Island Fort
  - Prospect Camp (Command Headquarters and Central District Headquarters)
    - Warwick Camp
    - Agar's Island
    - Royal Army Service Corps Wharf (Hamilton)
    - Hamilton Armoury
    - Prospect Hill Position
      - Fort Prospect
      - Fort Langton
      - Fort Hamilton
    - South Shore Batteries (former fixed batteries adapted for field guns)
      - Fort Bruere
      - Bailey's Bay Battery (Tucker's Town Battery, and Tucker's Town Bay Fort)
      - Newton's Bay Fort (Hall's Bay Fort)
      - Albouy's Fort
      - Harris' Bay Fort
      - Sears' Fort
      - Devonshire Bay Fort
      - Hungry Bay Fort
      - Crow Lane Fort (also known as New Paget's Fort and East Elbow Bay Fort)
      - Middleton's Bay Fort (also known as Centre Bay Fort)
      - West Elbow Bay Fort
      - Warwick Camp Battery
      - Warwick Fort
      - Jobson's Cove Fort
      - Great Turtle Bay Battery
      - Jobson's Fort
      - Hunt's Fort (Lighthouse Fort)
      - Ingham's Fort
      - Church Bay Fort East
      - Church Bay Fort West
  - Boaz Island and Watford Island (Clarence Barracks; Western District Headquarters)
    - Somerset Armoury
    - Whale Bay Battery (West Whale Bay)
    - Whale Bay Fort (West Whale Bay)
    - West Side Fort
    - Wreck Hill Fort
    - Scaur Hill Fort
    - Daniel's Island Fort and Daniel's Head (later transferred to Royal Navy then Royal Canadian Navy)
    - Mangrove Bay Fort
    - King's Point Redoubt
    - Maria's Hill Fort
- Bermuda Militia. 1612–1815.
- Bermudian Militia, Volunteer and Territorial Army Units, 1895–1965
- Bermuda Militia Artillery
- Bermuda Volunteer Rifle Corps
- Bermuda Volunteer Engineers
- Bermuda Militia Infantry
- Royal Bermuda Regiment
- Bermuda Home Guard
- Bermuda Cadet Corps
- Royal Air Force, RAF Darrell's Island. 1939–1945.
- Royal Air Force Transport Command station, Kindley Field

=== Halifax, Nova Scotia ===
- Admiralty House, Halifax
- Royal Naval Dockyard, Halifax
- Halifax Defence Complex
  - Citadel Hill (Fort George)
  - Fort Charlotte
  - York Redoubt
  - Prince of Wales Tower
  - Connaught Battery
  - Practice Battery
  - Sandwich Point
  - Camperdown Signal Station
  - Fort Chebucto
  - Fort Charlotte on George's Island
  - Fort Clarence
  - Devil's Battery
  - Five forts on McNabs Island:
    - Fort Ives
    - Fort Hugonin
    - Sherbrooke Tower
    - Strawberry Hill
    - Fort McNab
- 5th Battalion, Royal Garrison Regiment

=== Gibraltar ===
- British Forces Gibraltar
- Royal Navy Dockyard, Gibraltar
- Her Majesty's Naval Base Gibraltar
- HMS Rooke
- Fortifications of Gibraltar
  - Alexandra Battery
  - Civil Hospital Battery
  - Cumberland Flank Battery
  - Eliott's Battery
  - Europa Advance Batteries
  - Europa Battery
  - Europa Pass Battery
  - Gardiner's Battery
  - Genista Battery
  - Half Way Battery
  - Harding's Battery
  - Jones' Battery
  - King's Bastion
  - Lady Augusta's Battery
  - Lady Louisa's Battery
  - Lighthouse Battery
  - New Mole Battery
  - O'Hara's Battery
  - Orange Bastion
  - Parson's Lodge Battery
  - Prince Albert's Front
  - Prince of Wales Battery
  - Raglan's Battery
  - Rock Gun Battery
  - Signal Hill Battery
  - Victoria Battery
  - Wellington Front
  - Windmill Hill Batteries
  - Woodford's Battery
  - Zoca Flank Battery
- Devil's Tower Camp
- Retrenched Barracks
- RAF Gibraltar
- Royal Gibraltar Regiment
- 2nd Battalion, Royal Garrison Regiment
- Gibraltar Defence Police
- Gibraltar Cadet Force
- 2 Overseas (Gibraltar) Squadron, Air Training Corps (ATC)

=== Malta ===
- Lascaris War Rooms
- Admiralty House, Valletta
- Royal Naval Dockyard, Malta
- HMS Egmont or HMS St Angelo
- HMS Phoenicia (Fort Manoel)
- HMS Euroclydon
- Royal Navy Hospital Mtarfa
- Malta Command
- Fortifications of Malta
  - Fortifications of Mdina
  - Cambridge Battery
  - Cittadella
  - Della Grazie Battery
  - Fort Benghisa
  - Fort Chambray
  - Fort Campbell
  - Fort Delimara
  - Fort Leonardo
  - Fort Mellieħa
  - Fort Ricasoli
  - Fort Rinella
  - Fort St. Angelo
  - Fort Saint Elmo
  - Fort Saint Michael
  - Fort Saint Rocco
  - Fort San Lucian
  - Fort San Salvatore
  - Fort Tas-Silġ
  - Fort Tigné
  - Fort Pembroke
  - Fort Verdala
  - Garden Battery
  - Għargħar Battery
  - Lascaris Battery
  - Pembroke Battery
  - Saint Mary's Tower (or Comino Tower)
  - Saint Paul's Battery
  - Sliema Point Battery
  - Spinola Battery
  - Tarġa Battery
  - Victoria Lines
    - Fort Binġemma
    - Fort Madalena
    - Fort Mosta
  - Wolseley Battery
  - Żonqor Battery
- Pembroke Army Garrison
- Malta Tanks (Royal Tank Regiment)
- Royal Malta Artillery
- Malta Fortress Squadron, Royal Engineers
- Royal Signals in Malta
- The King's Own Malta Regiment
- 1st, 3rd, and 4th Battalions, Royal Garrison Regiment
- Royal Malta Fencible Regiment
- Air Headquarters Malta
- RAF Hal Far
- RAF Luqa
- RAF Ta Kali

== See also ==
- America and West Indies Station
- Royal Naval Dockyard, Bermuda
- Bermuda Garrison
- Royal Air Force, Bermuda (1939–1945)
- Military of Bermuda
- Military of Gibraltar
- Gibdock
- Malta Command
- Malta Dockyard
- Military history of Nova Scotia
- Royal Naval Dockyard, Halifax
