= Europa Advance Batteries =

Group of 3 British artillery batteries in Gibraltar

Europa Advance Battery
- Part of Fortifications of Gibraltar
- Gibraltar
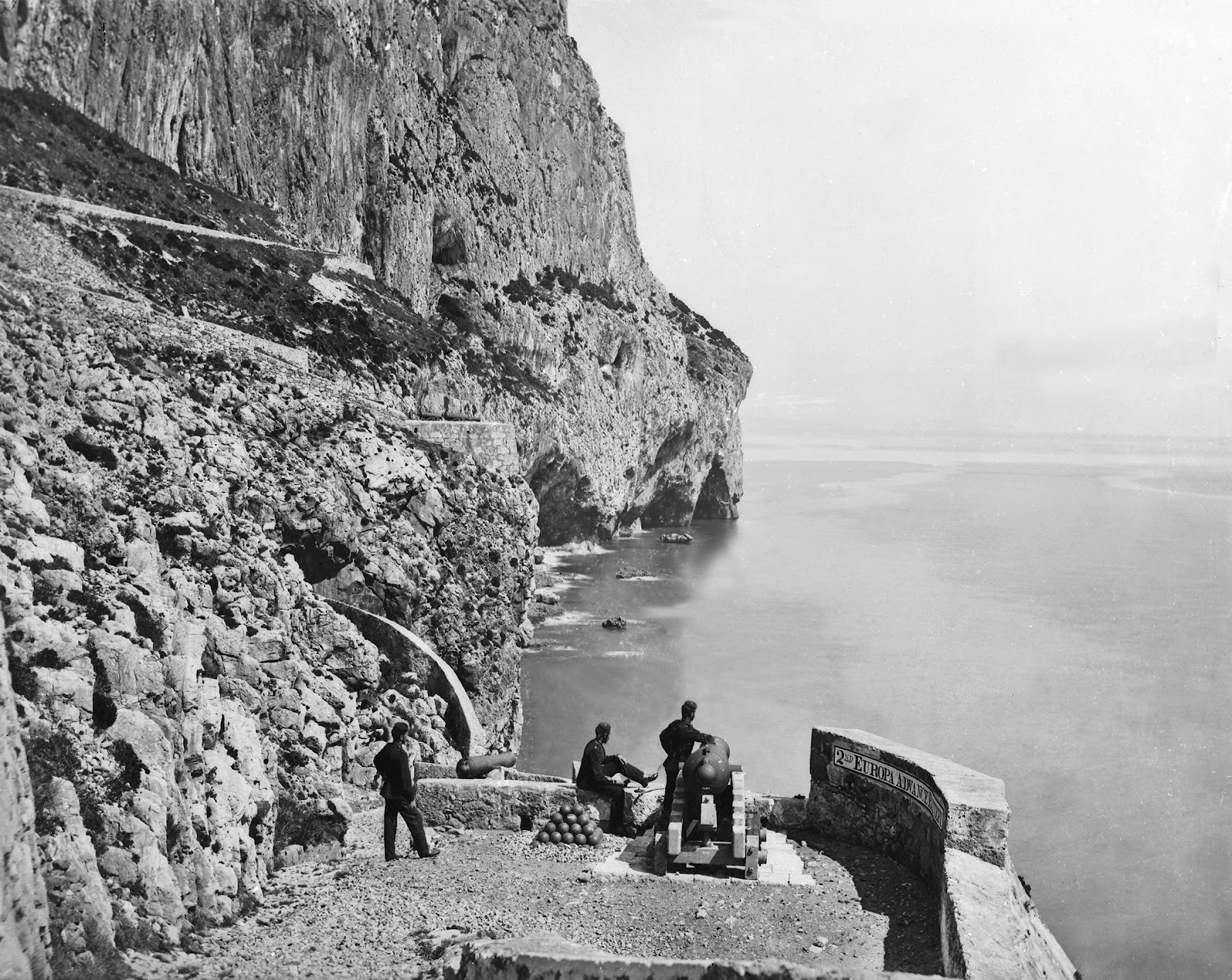
- Europa Advance in the 1890s (by George Washington Wilson)

Site information
- Type: Artillery batteries
- Owner: Government of Gibraltar

Location
- Location in Gibraltar
- Coordinates: 36.117356°N 5.341952°W

Europa Advance Batteries were a group of three artillery batteries in the British Overseas Territory of Gibraltar. They are located north east from Europa Point.

== Description ==
The group of batteries are located east of Europa Advance Road north west of Europa Point at the southern end of Gibraltar. Europa had been the site of earlier Spanish and Moorish fortifications as well as those constructed by the British which included walls, scarping and the batteries. (The definition of an advance battery is that is outside the main defended area but it is close enough to be offered support from the weapons of the main fortification.) Europa Pass Battery, Europa Battery, Eliott's Battery, Harding's Battery, Half Way Battery, Lighthouse Battery, Lady Louisa's Battery and Woodford's Battery were all supported by a local barracks.
