= Harding's Battery =

Artillery battery in Gibraltar

- Part of Fortifications of Gibraltar
- Gibraltar
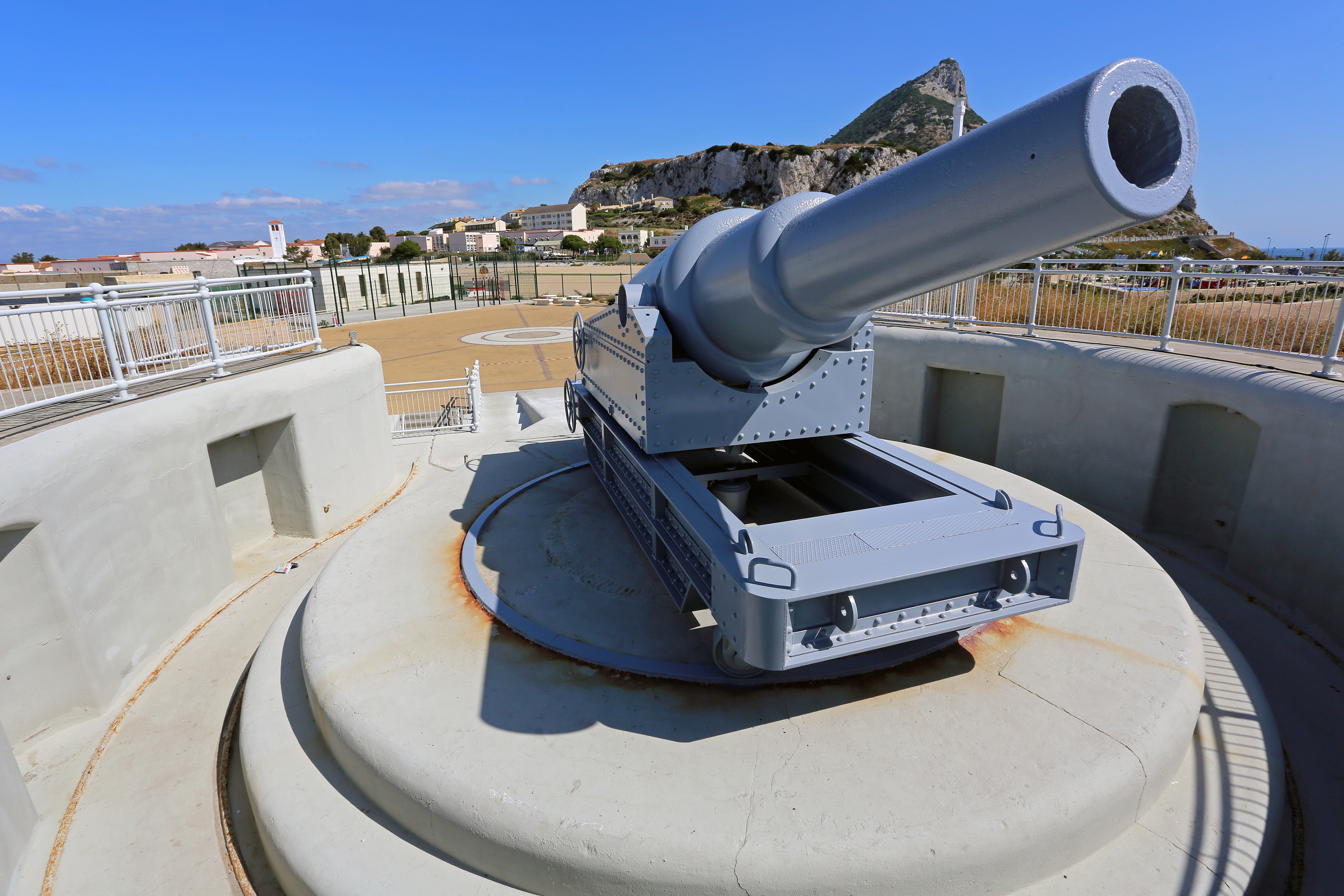
- Restored Harding's Battery in June 2013.

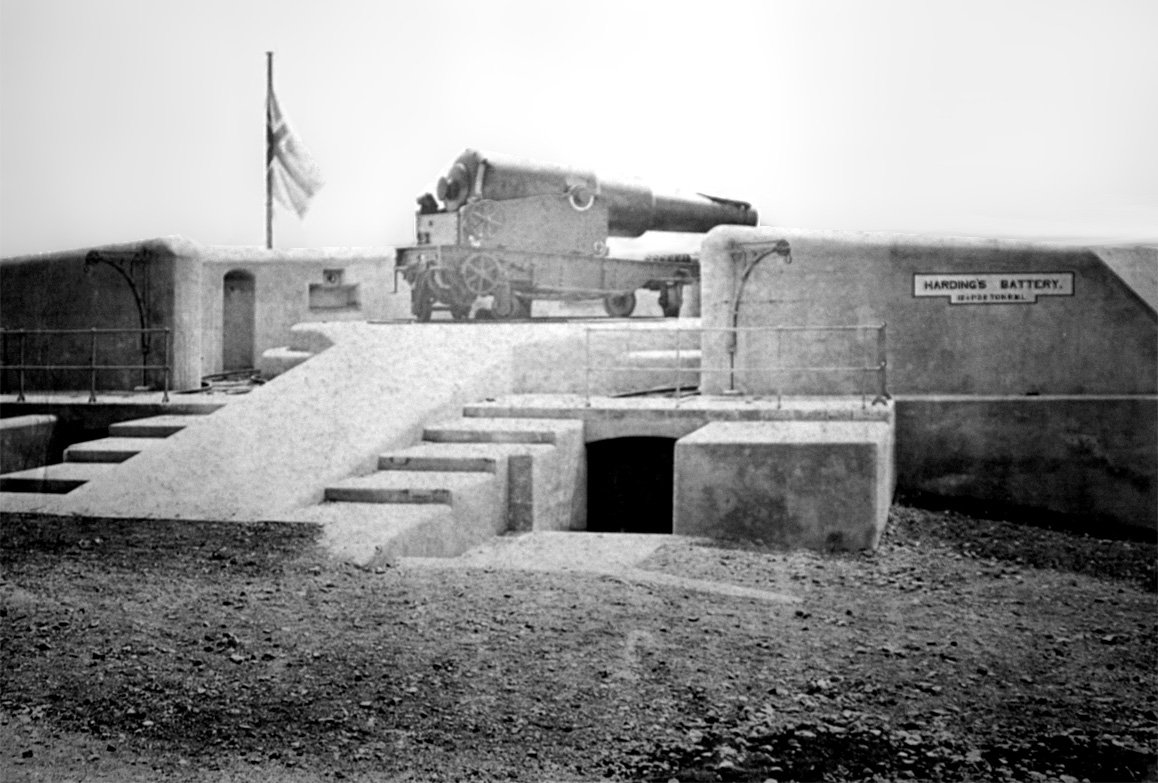
- RML 12.5 inch 38 ton gun mounted at Harding's Battery c. 1878.

Site information
- Type: Artillery battery
- Owner: Government of Gibraltar
- Open to the public: yes
- Condition: Refurbished

Location
- Location within Gibraltar.
- Coordinates: 36.109605°N 5.34626°W

Site history
- Built: 1859
- Built by: Government of the United Kingdom
- Materials: Concrete and brick

Harding's Battery is a restored artillery battery in the British Overseas Territory of Gibraltar. It is located at Europa Point and includes the Europa Sunken Magazine that is now used as a visitor centre.

== History ==
This battery is on Europa Point at the southern end of Gibraltar. Europa had been the site of earlier Spanish and Moorish fortifications as well as those constructed by the British which included walls, scarping and the batteries. Europa Advance Batteries, Europa Pass Batteries, Europa Batteries, Eliott's Battery, Europa Advance Battery, Half Way Battery, Lighthouse Battery, Lady Louisa's Battery and Woodford's Battery were supported by a local barracks.

Harding's battery was built on the remains of the 7th Europa Battery in 1859. The battery was named after Sir George Harding, who was chief engineer in 1844 and had been involved with Sir Charles Holloway in the 1810 destruction of the Spanish fortifications including Fort St. Felipe and Fort St. Barbara. At that time Europa Point was known as Harding's Point. For a few years the battery had two 18-pounder guns but these were replaced in 1863 with two 32-pounders.

Five years later Harding's was given a Rifled Muzzle Loading gun as part of the recommendations put forward by Colonel William Jervois who was inspecting and advised on the defences of British colonies including Gibraltar and the Andaman Islands from 1865. Jervois's 1868 recommendations took time and the approval was not given until 1876 by which time the 9 inch gun had become a larger 12.5 inch 38 ton RML gun which could fire 800 pound projectiles. This gun was commissioned in 1878 although it was feared that the gun may be difficult to defend in its exposed position. In 1904, a plan was put forward to move a 9.2-inch Mk 1 coastal defence gun from Inchkeith in Scotland to Harding's Battery, but it was never implemented. The large RML was eventually removed and from the start of World War II this battery was the location of a Bofors 40 mm anti-aircraft gun.

1892 record plans of the battery
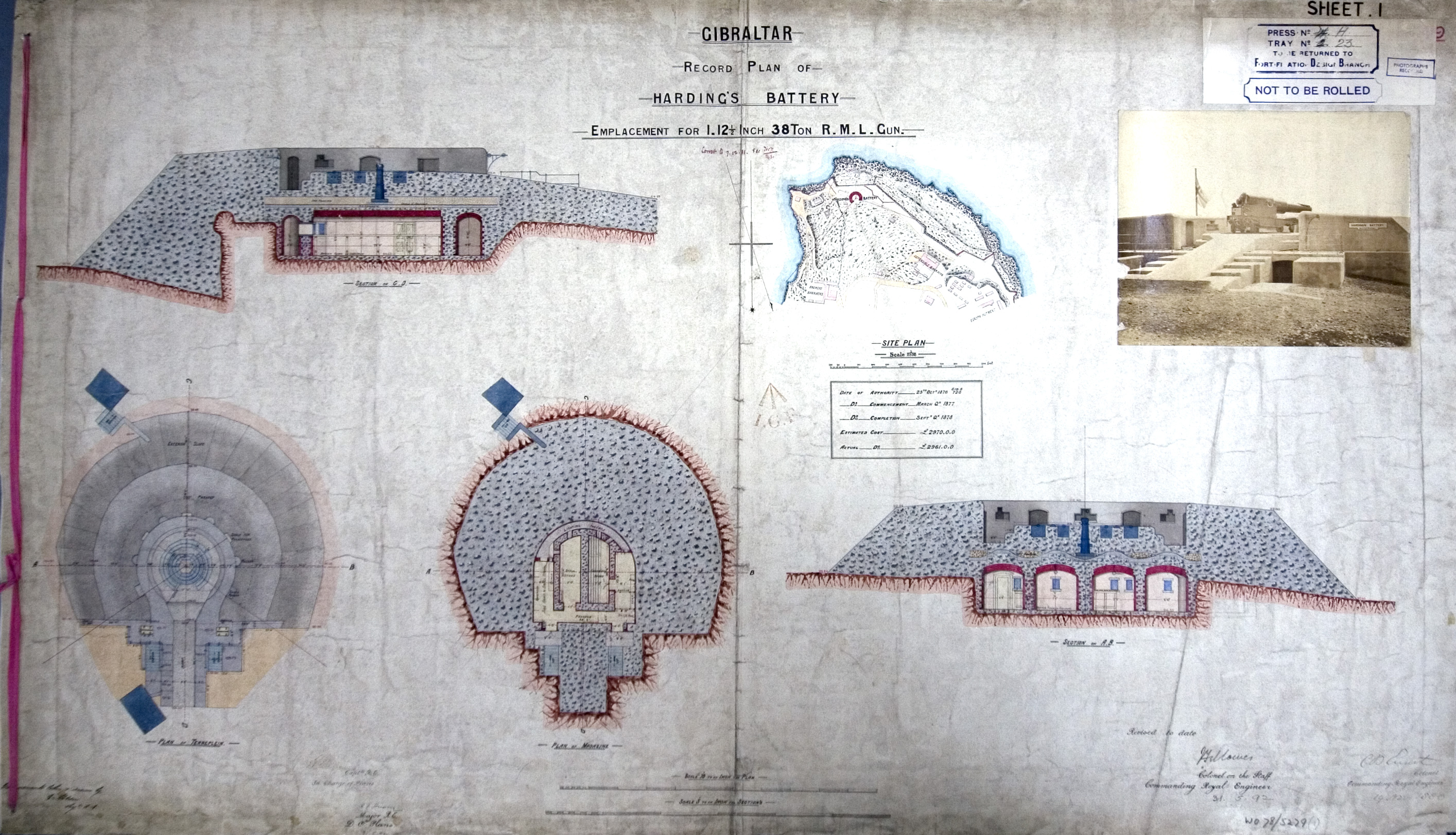
Sheet I

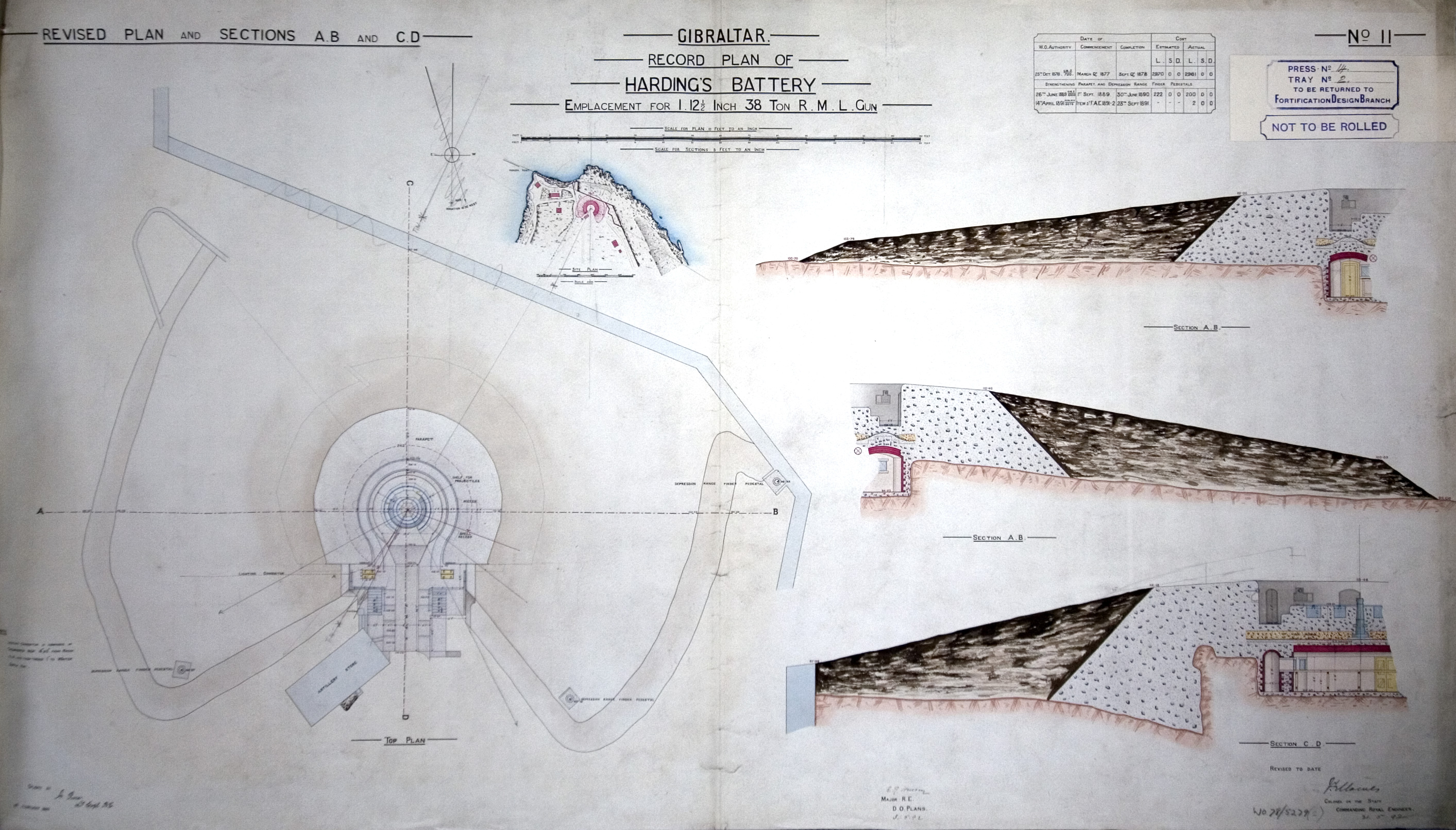
Sheet II

== Conservation ==
Harding's battery had been abandoned and buried under a mound of sand for years but it was unearthed and refurbished as part of a makeover of the whole of the Europa point area to include leisure facilities starting in March 2010. Harding's Battery was found to be in a condition where it could be restored and the magazine below was converted into a visitor centre with displays providing information on local history. The £4.4 million work on Europa Point was officially re-opened in October 2011 by the then Chief Minister of Gibraltar Peter Caruana.

Information displays inside the batteries magazine
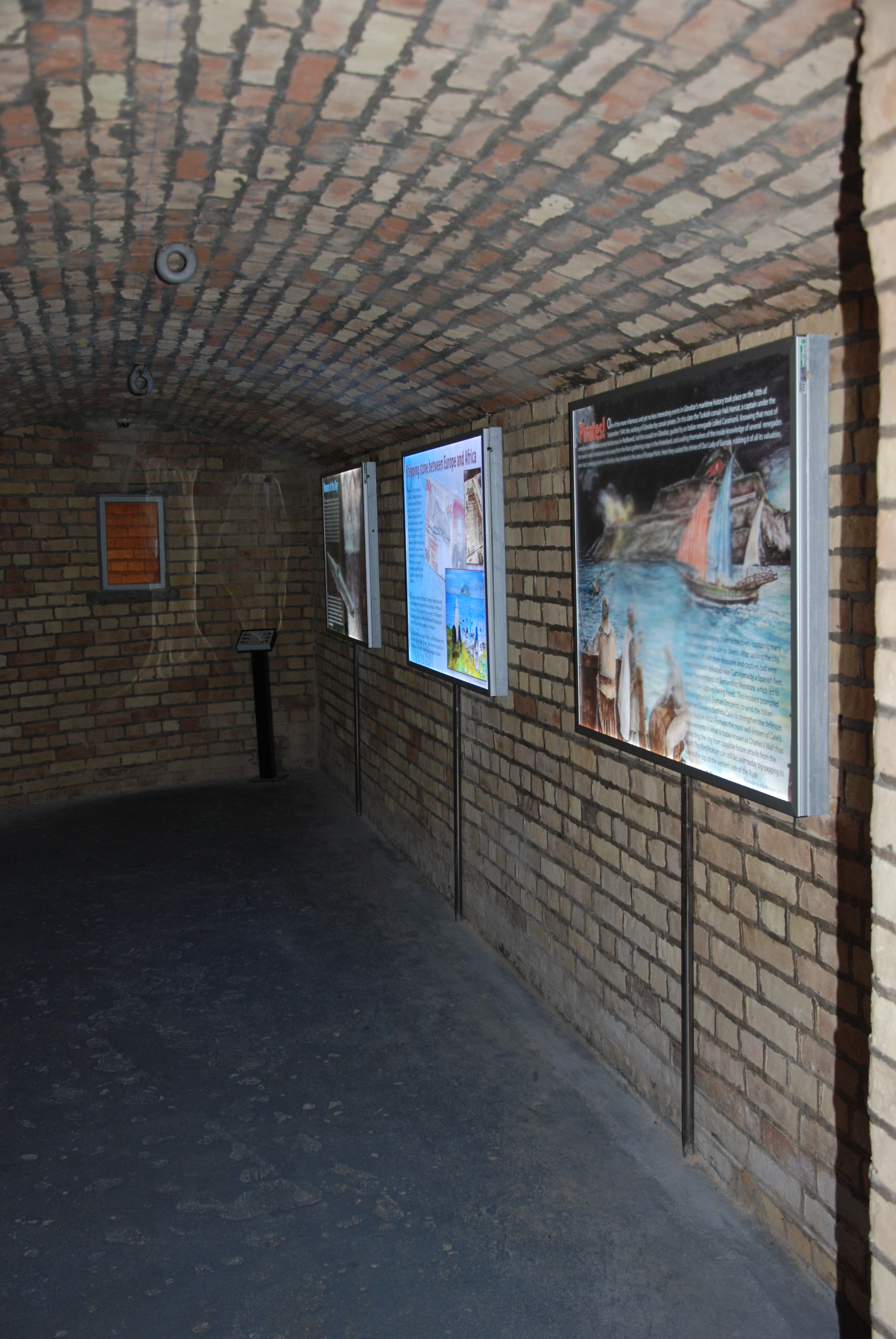
Information on the maritime history of Gibraltar

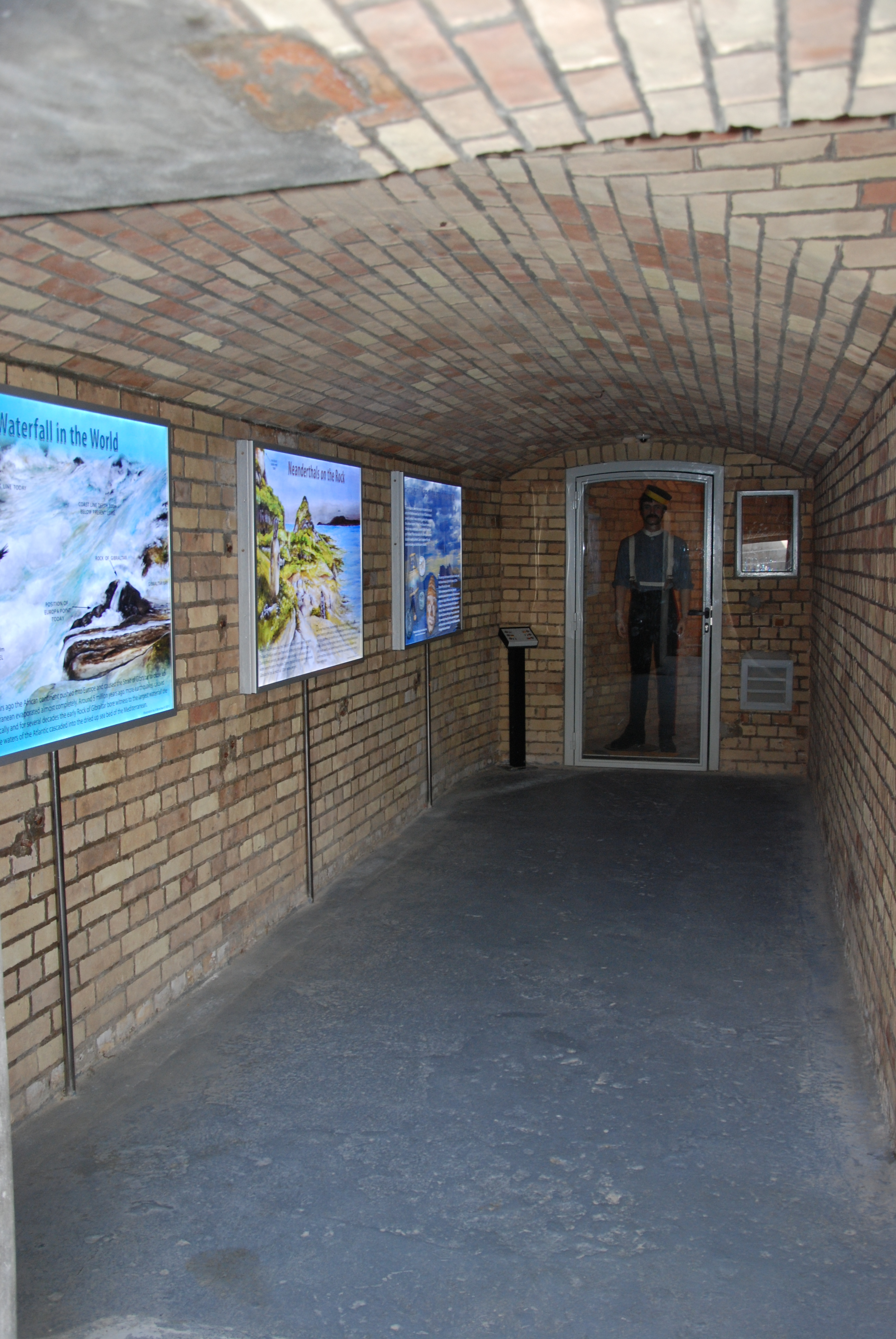
Information on prehistory including the Neanderthals of Gibraltar

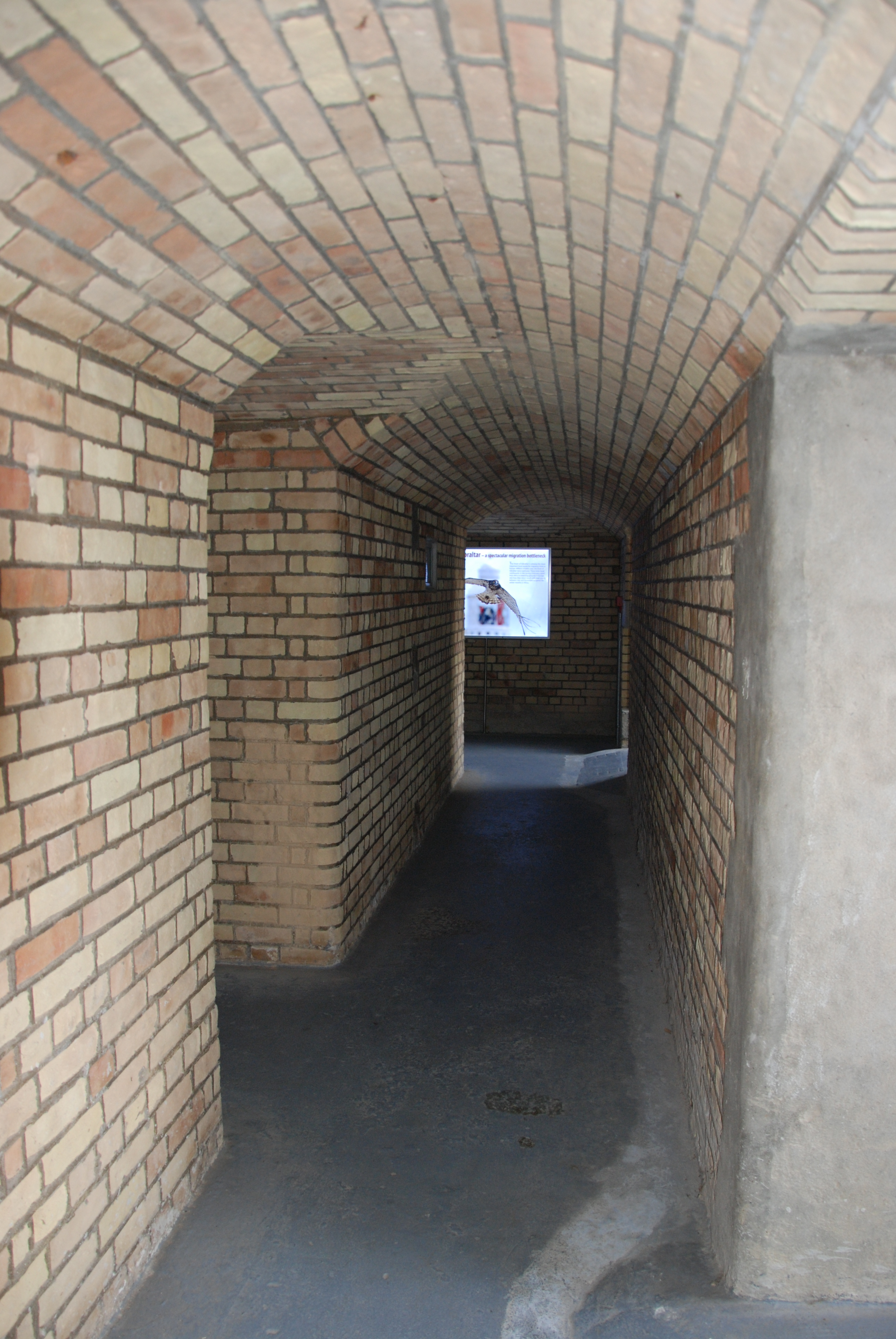
Information on ornithology

=== Re-installation of a gun ===
In 2013 the restoration was made complete when a 12.5 inch 38 ton RML gun (actually weighing 45 tonnes (50 tons)) found half buried at the southern entrance to Gibdock dating from the 1870s and identical to the battery's original gun, was installed on a replica carriage at Harding's Battery. This was made possible due to the Gibraltar Heritage Trust who had organised and partly funded the construction of a replacement gun carriage.
