= Prince George's Battery =

- Part of Fortifications of Gibraltar
- Europa Flats in Gibraltar

Site information
- Type: Artillery battery
- Owner: Government of Gibraltar
- Open to the public: Yes
- Condition: Mostly built over

Location
- Location within Gibraltar
- Coordinates: 36.114033°N 5.34961°W

Site history
- Built by: UK Ministry of Defence

Prince George's Battery is an artillery battery in the British Overseas Territory of Gibraltar. The battery is located at Europa Flats just north of Eliott's Battery.
