= Devil's Bowling Green Battery =

- Part of Fortifications of Gibraltar
- Gibraltar

Site information
- Type: Artillery battery
- Owner: Ministry of Defence

Location
- Location in Gibraltar
- Coordinates: 36.11548°N 5.3500°W

Devil's Bowling Green Battery was an artillery battery in the British Overseas Territory of Gibraltar. In 1859, the battery had two guns that looked over Little Bay. This battery was on the shoreline but it was overlooked by the Buena Vista Battery and the seven guns of the Europa Pass Batteries.
