= Europa Batteries =

Group of artillery batteries in Gibraltar

- Part of Fortifications of Gibraltar
- Gibraltar
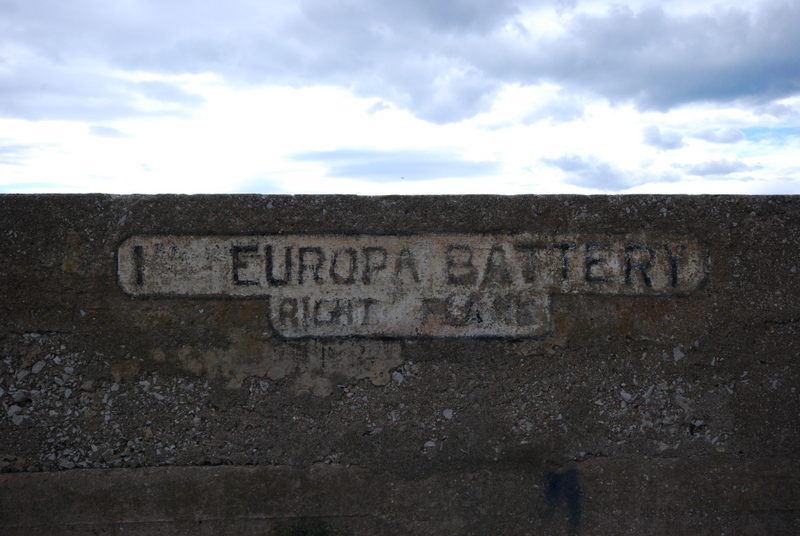
- 1st Europa Battery Right Flank

Site information
- Type: Artillery batteries
- Owner: Government of Gibraltar

Location
- Location in Gibraltar
- Coordinates: 36.110063°N 5.347708°W

The Europa Batteries are a group of artillery batteries in the British Overseas Territory of Gibraltar. Facing the North African coast, they are the most southerly batteries in Gibraltar and were built to cover ships approaching from the Mediterranean Sea. They run along the fortified clifftops of Europa Point from Camp Bay on the west side of the Rock of Gibraltar to the Europa Advance Batteries on the east side.

The batteries were constructed in the 18th century on top of an old coastal wall built by King Charles V of Spain. There were originally only two batteries at the Point – in 1762 these were the Five Gun Battery, which mounted five 18-pdrs, and Europa Point Battery, which had a single 18-pdr. A third position, Deadman's Hole Battery, was later constructed and by 1859 the three batteries had 25 guns between them.

They were subsequently reorganised into a series of seven batteries. 1st Europa Battery was a three-gun battery situated on the coastal defence wall south of Woodford's Battery. 2nd Europa was also referred to as Point or Deadman's Hole Battery and was situated a little way to the east, behind a demi-bastion at the southern end of the wall. 3rd Europa or Lighthouse Battery was situated next to the Europa Point Lighthouse and mounted three guns. The refurbished Harding's Battery was originally built on top of what was the 7th Europa Battery in 1859 and it was positioned between what became the 1st and 2nd Europa Batteries. A Bofors 40 mm anti-aircraft gun was situated at Harding's during the Second World War.
