= Sikorski Memorial =

Monument in Gibraltar

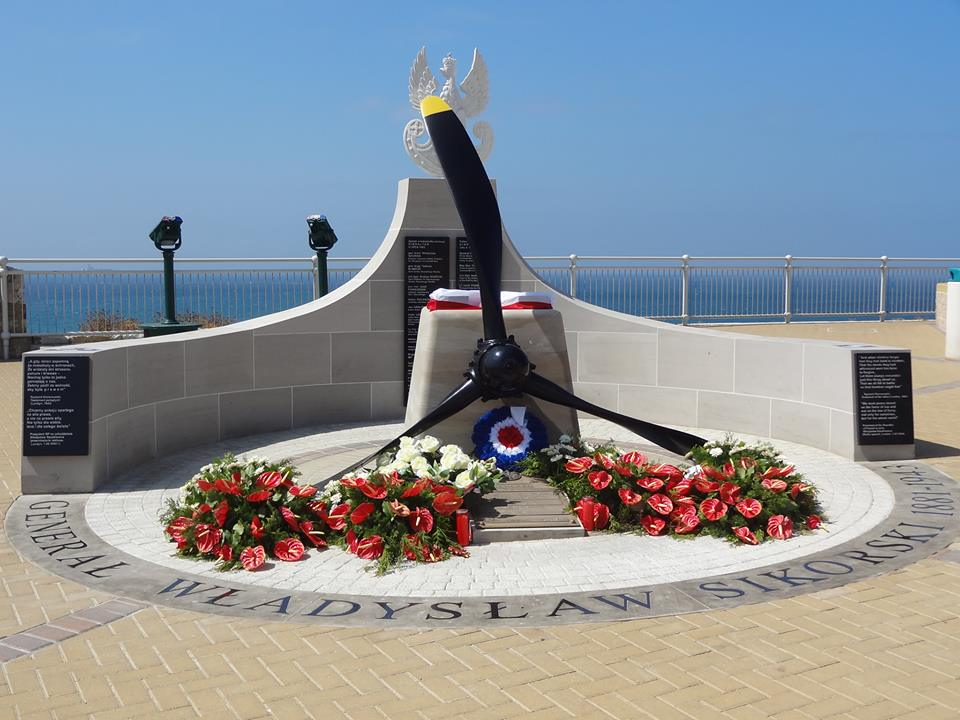
- The Sikorski Memorial at Europa Point in July 2013
- Interactive map of Sikorski Memorial
- Location: Europa Point, Gibraltar
- Coordinates: 36°06′35″N 5°20′45″W
- Type: Military
- Material: Szydłów sandstone
- Length: 5 metres (16 ft)
- Width: 5 metres (16 ft)
- Height: 3 metres (9.8 ft)
- Opening date: 1945
- Dedicated to: The dead from the 1943 Gibraltar B-24 crash

The Sikorski Memorial in Gibraltar commemorates the 1943 Gibraltar B-24 crash of 4 July 1943 which caused the death of General Władysław Sikorski, the commander-in-chief of the Polish Army and Prime Minister of the Polish government in exile. Fifteen other people also died in the crash, with only the pilot Eduard Prchal surviving. The present version of the memorial, unveiled on 4 July 2013, is the third, replacing two earlier memorials erected in 1945 and 2003 near the scene of the crash. It was designed and constructed by a Polish company, using sandstone from Poland brought across Europe to Gibraltar where it now comprises much of the 5 metres (16 ft) wide memorial.

== Earlier versions of the Sikorski Memorial ==
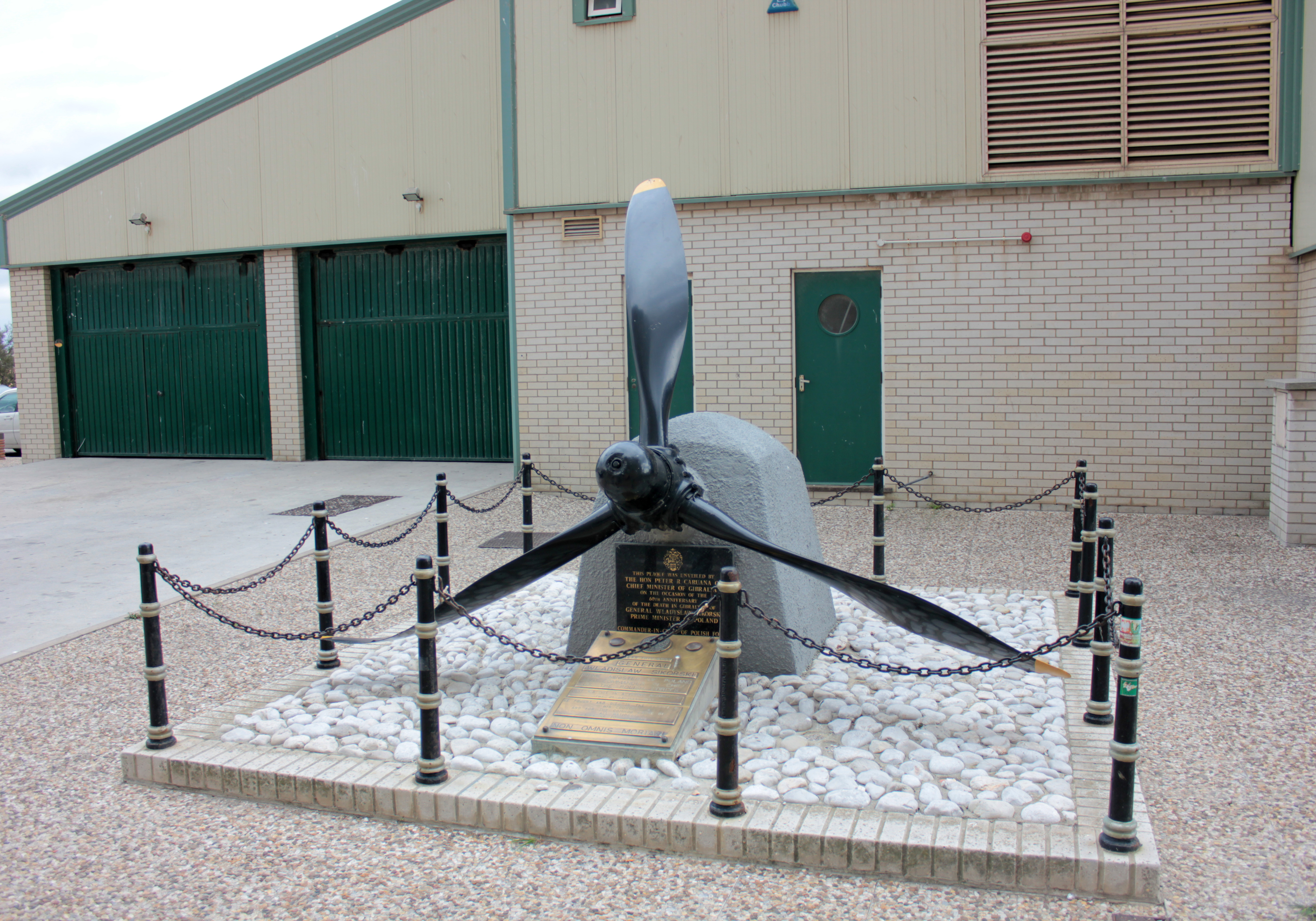
The 2003 version of the memorial, located near Gibraltar's runway

The memorial originally consisted of a plaque, dedicated in January 1945, that was placed at the east end of the runway of what was then RAF North Front (and is now RAF Gibraltar / Gibraltar International Airport). The text of the plaque reads:

Near this spot
General Władysław Sikorski
Prime Minister of Poland and commander in chief of Polish forces
lost his life in a flying accident on the 4th of July 1943
He fought and died in the service of his country and for the common cause of all nations fighting for freedom
NON OMNIS MORIAR

In 2003, the Royal Air Force donated the plaque to the Government of Gibraltar and a new memorial was erected near the airfield at Sir Herbert Miles Road, consisting of a plinth on which the plaque was mounted along with a propeller recovered from the crashed B-24. A second plaque was also installed, reading:

This plaque was unveiled by the Hon. Peter R. Caruana Q.C., Chief Minister of Gibraltar, on the occasion of the 60th anniversary of the death of GENERAL WLADISLAW SIKORSKI, Prime Minister of Poland and Commander-in-Chief of Polish Forces
4 July 2003

However, the location proved unsatisfactory. Although it was a popular destination for Polish visitors to Gibraltar, there was little space around the memorial and neither tour groups nor official delegations had much room to assemble in its vicinity. The Polish authorities lobbied for a number of years to have the memorial moved to a more spacious site elsewhere in Gibraltar.

== Current memorial's location and design ==
In 2013 the memorial was relocated to Europa Point, the southernmost tip of the Gibraltar peninsula, and was reinstalled with a new design at a site between Europa Point Lighthouse and Harding's Battery. Its design was based on a concept by the late Charles Caruana, Bishop of Gibraltar, who had a long-running interest in Gibraltar's connection with Poland and in Sikorski's history and memory.

The new design is a semi-circular structure with a diameter of 5 metres (16 ft) and a maximum height of 3 metres (9.8 ft). The B-24's propeller from the previous memorial was remounted on a new, larger plinth weighing more than two tons. A disc of sandstone from Szydłów in Poland is set into the ground in the centre of the memorial, forming the plinth's base. In front of the disc, carved into the ground, are the words "General Władysław Sikorski 1881–1943". Behind the disc is a stone semi-circular wall which rises to a peak on which a carved Polish military eagle stands. The Polish naval pennant and air force emblem are embedded at opposite ends of the wall. Tablets name the other victims, in addition to Sikorski, and explain the events of the crash to visitors. The memorial was constructed by Furmanek Renewal, a company based in Daleszyce in south-central Poland, where it was first assembled to test that it all fitted together before it was driven to Gibraltar to be installed over a period of about two and a half weeks.

== Dedication of the memorial ==
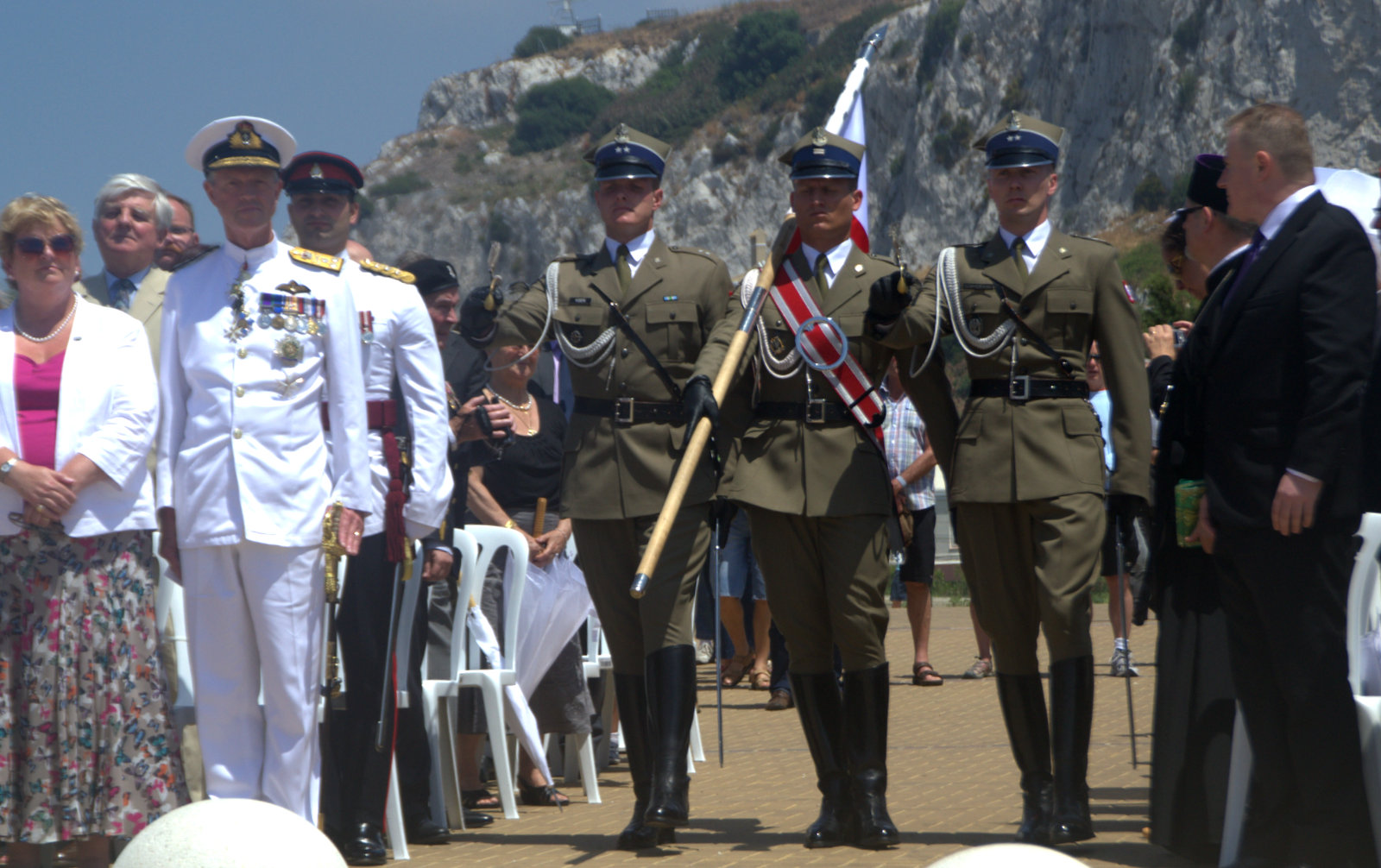
Dedication of the new memorial on 4 July 2013, with Vice Admiral Sir Adrian Johns at front left

The memorial was dedicated in a ceremony held on 4 July 2013, the 70th anniversary of the crash, in which British, Gibraltarian and Polish government officials participated alongside past and present members of the Polish Armed Forces. Two Polish government ministers, Jan Stanisław Ciechanowski of the Office for War Veterans and Victims of Oppression and Andrzej Krzysztof Kunert from the Council for the Protection of Struggle and Martyrdom Sites, led the Polish delegation. Polish and Gibraltarian clergy also attended, and the ceremony was hosted by the Governor of Gibraltar, Vice Admiral Sir Adrian Johns, and the Mayor of Gibraltar, Anthony Lima. The British military was represented by the Commander British Forces Gibraltar and the Commanding Officer of the Royal Gibraltar Regiment. Johns spoke in his address of "a man who lived and died as a fearless soldier and indomitable champion of the Polish cause," while Bronisław Komorowski, the President of Poland, said in an address read on his behalf at the ceremony that he wished for the memorial to "symbolically point at those highest values which are common to us: brotherhood and freedom."
