= Alexandra Battery =

- Part of Fortifications of Gibraltar
- South Mole, Gibraltar Harbour in Gibraltar
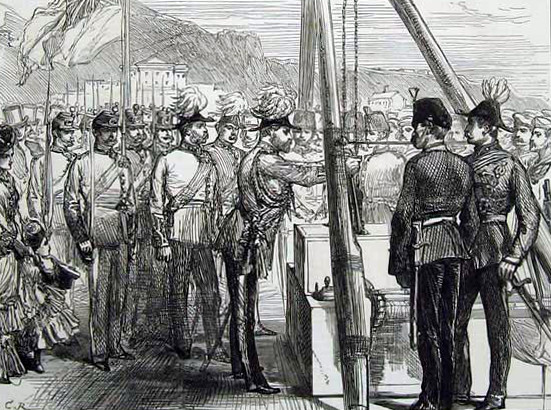
- 1876 illustration of the Prince of Wales at Alexandra Battery in Gibraltar

Site information
- Type: Coastal artillery battery
- Owner: Government of Gibraltar
- Open to the public: No
- Condition: Good

Location
- Location within Gibraltar
- Coordinates: 36.124948°N 5.355615°W

Site history
- Built: 1876-78
- Built by: UK Ministry of Defence

Alexandra Battery is a coastal artillery battery in the British Overseas Territory of Gibraltar. It was constructed at the neck of the South Mole (originally the New Mole) to enfilade the coastal fortifications of Gibraltar. The battery stood on the site of several previous fortifications; it was built over the New Mole Battery, which was itself constructed on the site of an old Spanish fort in front of the Tuerto Tower.

The battery owed its construction to the recommendations of an 1868 report by Colonel (later General) William Jervois. He proposed that a new battery should be constructed on the site to house a RML 12.5 inches (320 mm) 38 ton gun – at the time, the heaviest rifled muzzle-loading gun in the British Army's inventory – in a casemate protected by an iron shield. It was named after Alexandra of Denmark, the wife of Edward, Prince of Wales (later King Edward VII). He laid the foundation stone in 1876 and the battery was finished two years later, but it was already out of date by 1902, and by 1906 it had been converted into accommodation casemates. The slide and the mounting were subsequently scrapped but the 12.5 inch gun was moved to near Engineer Battery and finally relocated to Harding's Battery in 2013. In 1940, a QF 2-pounder Pom-pom gun was installed on the top of the casemates to protect the South Mole and a Bofors 40 mm gun was installed in 1941 to provide anti-aircraft defence. The battery still exists and is reportedly in a relatively good condition.
