= George Harding (British Army officer) =

British Army general

Lieutenant-General Sir George Harding KCB
- Born: Solihull, Warwickshire, England
- Died: 5 July 1860; Guernsey, United Kingdom
- Military career
- Allegiance: United Kingdom
- Branch: British Army
- Rank: Lieutenant-General
- Conflicts: Napoleonic Wars
- Awards: Knight Commander of the Order of the Bath

Lieutenant-General Sir George Judd Harding KCB (died 5 July 1860) was a British Army officer who became Lieutenant Governor of Guernsey.

== Military career ==
Harding was commissioned into the Royal Engineers in 1802. He took part in the Napoleonic Wars, being deployed first to Messina in 1807, and then to Gibraltar, where in 1810 he worked with Sir Charles Holloway on the demolition of two Spanish forts and the rest of the Spanish Lines of Contravallation of Gibraltar. He was the Chief Engineer on Gibraltar in about 1831.

He was appointed Lieutenant Governor of Guernsey in 1856 and was also Colonel Commandant of the Corps of Royal Engineers.

In 1860 he was appointed a Knight Commander of the Order of the Bath. He died later that year.

== Legacy ==
On Gibraltar, he worked on a number of fortifications. There is a refurbished gun battery which is called Harding's Battery. At one point the southern tip of Gibraltar was known as Harding's Point.

Government offices
Preceded by Sir William Knollys	Lieutenant Governor of Guernsey; 1856–1859	Succeeded by Marcus Slade
