= Buena Vista Barracks and Battery =

Buena Vista Battery
- Part of Fortifications of Gibraltar
- Buena Vista in Gibraltar
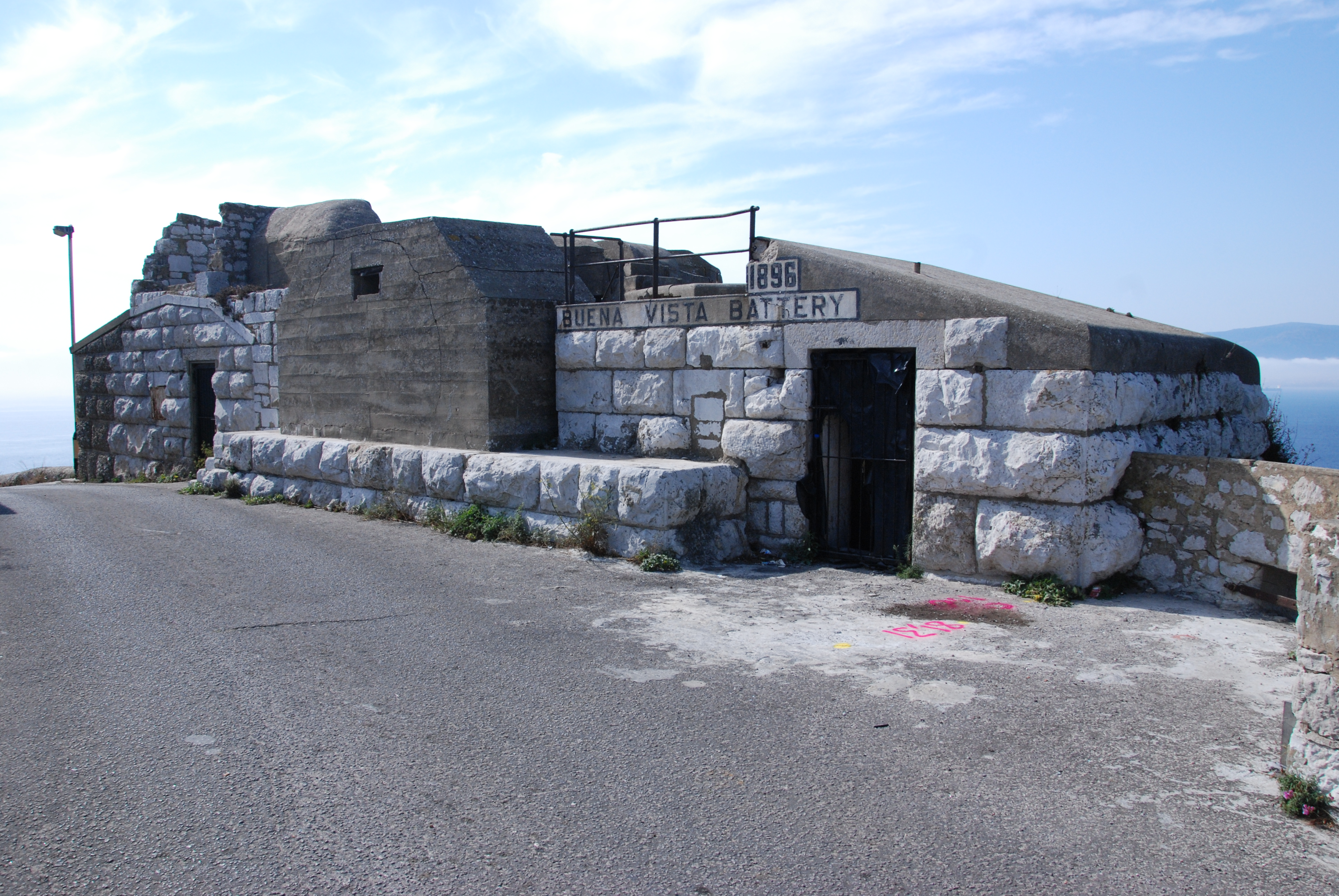
- Buena Vista Battery

Site information
- Type: Coastal artillery battery
- Owner: Government of Gibraltar
- Open to the public: Yes
- Condition: Abandoned

Location
- Location within Gibraltar
- Coordinates: 36.117986°N 5.349997°W

Site history
- Built by: UK Ministry of Defence

Garrison information
- Garrison: Royal Gibraltar Regiment

Buena Vista Battery was an artillery battery near the Buena Vista Barracks at the southern end of the British Overseas Territory of Gibraltar. It is located on a slight ridge in front of the nearby Buena Vista Barracks, which was once the base of the Royal Gibraltar Regiment.

== Description ==
The area of the battery and barracks was originally used as a lookout post with an attached guardroom, which had to be rebuilt in the 1760s after falling into ruin. At the time the shoreline below was considered to be unassailable, as it was swept by strong currents. The lookout was subsequently converted into an artillery battery intended to protect Camp Bay from surprise attacks.

By 1834 it had two 18-inch (460 mm) howitzers and two 32-pdrs (14.5 kg), but these were removed by 1859. A 9-inch (230 mm) rifled muzzle loader (RML) in an open iron shielded emplacement was installed in 1872, and in 1896 two additional emplacements were added to house two QF 12-pdr (5.4 kg) 12 cwt (610 kg) Mark I guns. Two 12-pdr QF guns on cone mountings were installed in 1902. In October 1940, during the Second World War, a 4-inch (100 mm) naval gun was installed on the battery.

The adjoining barracks was constructed in the 1840s to the designs of Major General Sir John Thomas Jones; it was one of several that were built in the territory following a report that he produced on Gibraltar's defences (see also Defensible Barracks and Retrenched Barracks). Also known as the "Stone Block", its simple design consisted of a single rectangular block with windows on each side, divided into two sections on each floor with three wide intercommunicating rooms in each section. It was used for many years by the Royal Gibraltar Regiment but was subsequently converted for commercial use as factory and storage units.

== Battery and barracks today ==
The Government of Gibraltar has designated Buena Vista Battery as a Class A listed building under the Gibraltar Heritage Trust Act of 1989. The ownership of buildings associated with Buena Vista passed from the UK Ministry of Defence ownership to the Government of Gibraltar in 2011. The agreement swapped over 300 MOD houses and flats with the Government of Gibraltar and in exchange they agreed to build 90 new houses on remaining MOD land.

The site is now being re-developed for residential use but the developers intend to retain, restore and preserve the barracks and the gun emplacements. The fifteen residences were said to sell for between one and two million pounds.
