= New Mole Battery =

Artillery battery in Gibraltar

- Part of Fortifications of Gibraltar
- South Mole, Gibraltar Harbour in Gibraltar

Site information
- Type: Coastal artillery battery
- Owner: Government of Gibraltar
- Open to the public: No
- Condition: Poor

Site history
- Built by: UK Ministry of Defence

New Mole Battery was an artillery battery in the British Overseas Territory of Gibraltar.

== Description ==
The New Mole Battery is used by the Gibraltar Fire Brigade for practise. which has not assisted its condition. The nearby Alexandra Battery is said to be in good condition.
