= Defensible Barracks =

- Part of Fortifications of Gibraltar
- Europa Point in Gibraltar

Site information
- Type: Barracks
- Owner: UK Ministry of Defence
- Open to the public: No
- Condition: Converted into a school

Location
- Location within Gibraltar
- Coordinates: 36.110626°N 5.348336°W

Site history
- Built: 1841
- Built by: UK Ministry of Defence

The Defensible Barracks is a fortified barracks located at Europa Flats in the British Overseas Territory of Gibraltar.

The British defensive strategy in Gibraltar predominantly focused on keeping enemies at a distance through the use of artillery. There were few inner lines of defence to address the risk of an enemy getting through the outer line. However, the southern tip of Gibraltar, Europa Point, was long felt to be potentially vulnerable to a surprise attack from the sea and was heavily fortified with gun batteries, perimeter walls and scarped cliffs.

In 1841, Major General Sir John Thomas Jones KCB recommended in a report on Gibraltar's fortifications that provision should be made for close defence of the batteries at Europa Point, which he identified as a possible invasion route. He recommended that "all barracks should be either bombproof or fireproof, and to a certain extent defensible." To that end, he designed a defensible barracks block which could be used both as a place of relaxation and as a fortification. Its front was pierced with loopholes to facilitate rifle fire, while the walled courtyard at the rear was protected by caponiers projecting out from each wall. The walls themselves were also pierced with loopholes.

The building was capable of withstanding small arms fire and a direct assault, but was still vulnerable to a naval bombardment. It was strengthened some years later by the construction of a New Defensible or Bombproof Barracks, built on the curtain wall between 1st Europa Right Flank and Woodford's Left Flank. The new barracks stood between the existing Defensible Barracks and the sea, with its massive stone wall providing shelter for the accommodation casemates.

The barracks complex is now used as a children's school.
