= Europa Pass Batteries =

Artillery batteries in Gibraltar

- Part of Fortifications of Gibraltar
- Gibraltar
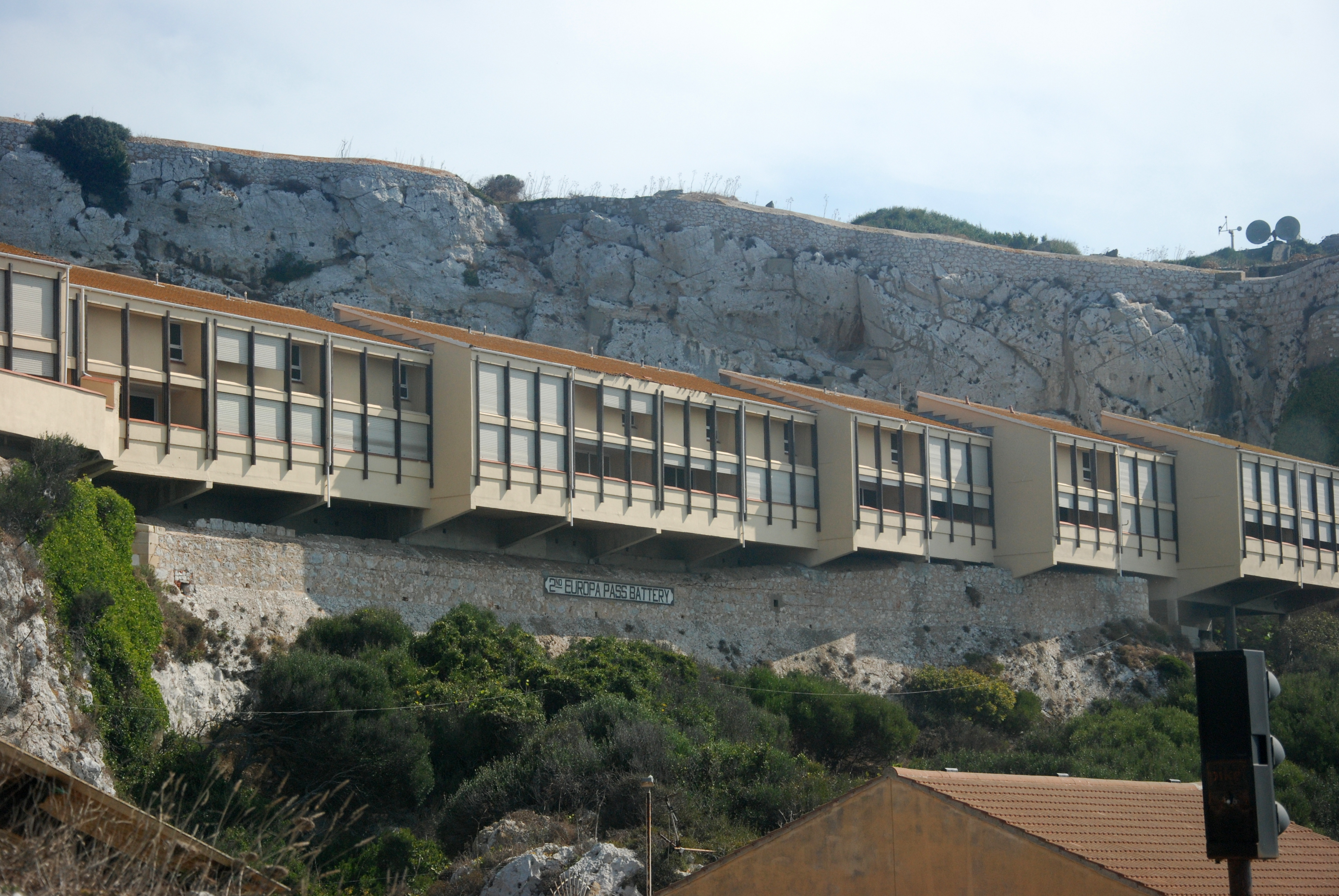
- 2nd Europa Pass Battery in 2012

Site information
- Type: Artillery batteries
- Owner: Government of Gibraltar

Location
- Location in Gibraltar
- Coordinates: 36.116589°N 5.348046°W

Europa Pass Batteries are a group of artillery batteries in the British Overseas Territory of Gibraltar. They are located north west of Europa Point in the south of Gibraltar, just off Europa Road.

In 1859 the battery had seven guns that looked over the west shoreline around Little Bay. Close to the shore was the Devil's Bowling Green Battery that was overlooked by this battery and the Buena Vista Battery.

The ownership of houses associated with the Europa Pass Batteries were passed from the UK Ministry of Defence to the Government of Gibraltar in 2011. The agreement swapped over 300 MOD houses and flats with the Government of Gibraltar and in exchange they agreed to build 90 new houses on remaining MOD land.
