= Woodford's Battery =

Artillery battery in Gibraltar

- Part of Fortifications of Gibraltar
- Europa Flats in Gibraltar

Site information
- Type: Artillery battery
- Owner: Government of Gibraltar
- Open to the public: Yes
- Condition: Abandoned

Location
- Location within Gibraltar
- Coordinates: 36.11085°N 5.3496°W

Site history
- Built by: UK Ministry of Defence

Woodford's Battery was an artillery battery in the British Overseas Territory of Gibraltar. It is located at Europa Flats between the Defensible Barracks and the Officer's Barracks and Eliott's Battery.

The battery was built before 1738 as a demi-bastion set into the old Spanish-era coastal wall, constructed by Charles V. It was originally called Five Gun Battery but its complement of guns was later expanded. It was equipped with four embrasures on the left flank, facing south-east towards Europa Point, and two on the right flank, facing north-west towards the nearby Hutment Battery. Further firing positions were provided a short distance further south by the three-gun Woodford's Left Flank battery, which together with the 1st Europa Point Right Flank battery enfiladed the ground in front of the Defensible Barracks. It was renamed after a governor of Gibraltar, Field Marshal Sir Alexander George Woodford, who served in that role between 1836 and 1843.

Nine guns had been installed in the battery by 1859 and it continued to mount a variety of guns up to 1892. During World War II it was used to mount a defence electric light, which was removed in the late 20th century.
