= Eliott's Battery =

- Part of Fortifications of Gibraltar
- Europa Flats in Gibraltar

Site information
- Type: Artillery battery
- Owner: Government of Gibraltar
- Open to the public: Yes
- Condition: Mostly built over

Location
- Location within Gibraltar
- Coordinates: 36.111987°N 5.350112°W

Site history
- Built by: UK Ministry of Defence

Eliott's Battery was an artillery battery in the British Overseas Territory of Gibraltar. The battery is located in front of the Officer's Barracks at Europa Flats between Prince George's Battery and Woodford's Battery. The battery is named after George Augustus Eliott, 1st Baron Heathfield, Governor of Gibraltar 1777–1790.
