= Lighthouse Battery =

Artillery battery in Gibraltar

- Part of Fortifications of Gibraltar
- Gibraltar

Site information
- Type: Artillery battery
- Owner: Ministry of Defence

Lighthouse Battery was an artillery battery in the British Overseas Territory of Gibraltar.

== Description ==
Lighthouse Battery had four 3.7-inch (94 mm) Anti-Aircraft guns during World War II. It was the penultimate battery at the southern end of Gibraltar which is known as Europa Point.
