= Half Way Battery =

Artillery battery in Gibraltar

- Part of Fortifications of Gibraltar
- Gibraltar

Site information
- Type: Artillery battery
- Owner: Ministry of Defence

Location
- Location in Gibraltar
- Coordinates: 36.113°N 5.3435°W

Site history
- Built by: British

Half Way Battery was an artillery battery in the British Overseas Territory of Gibraltar. The battery was on the coast on the eastern side of the isthmus just north of Europa Point Lighthouse. In 1859 there were two guns.
