= Europa Point =

Southernmost point of Gibraltar

Coordinates: 36.109609°N 5.34626°W

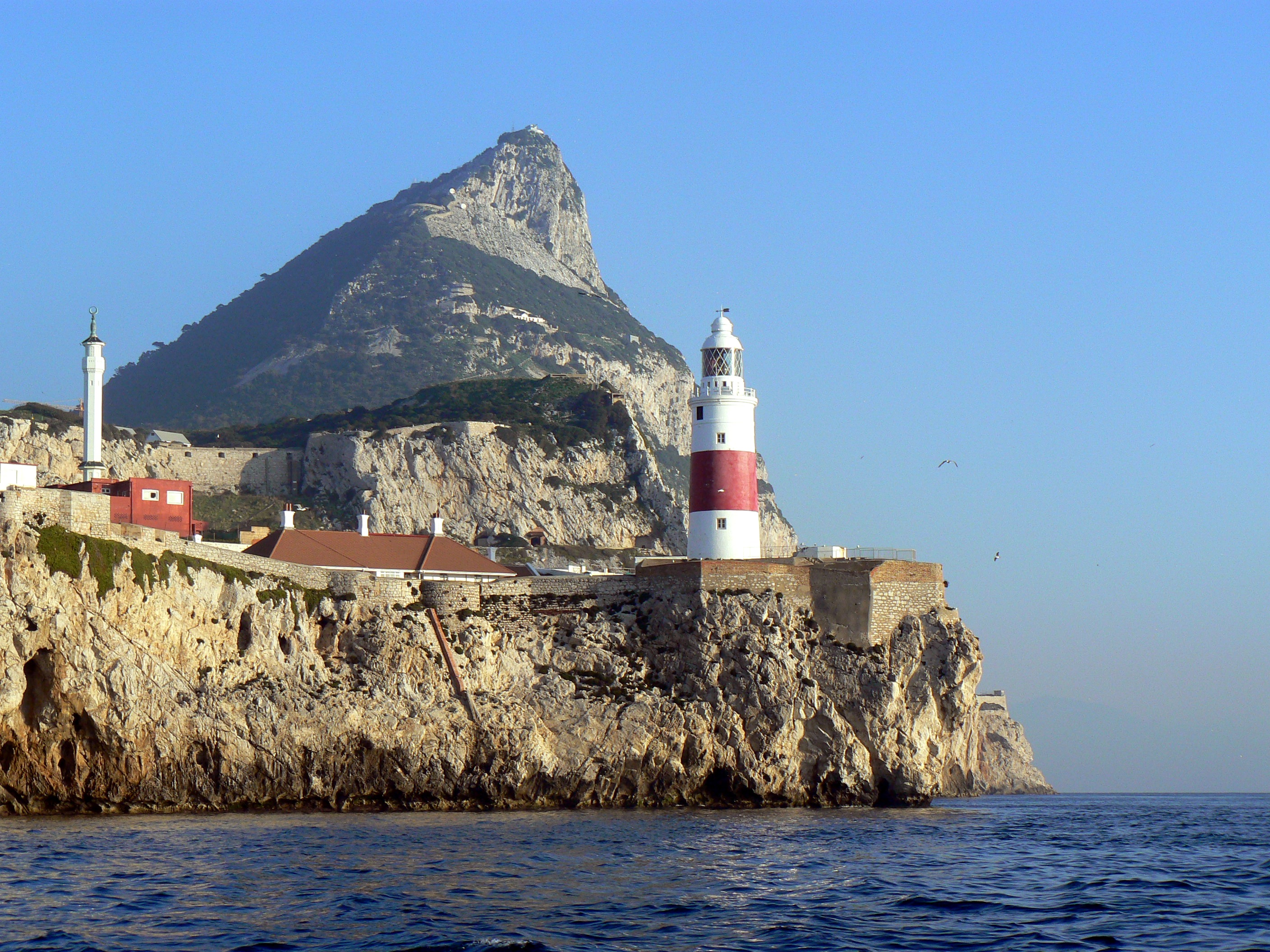
Europa Point as seen from the Strait of Gibraltar.

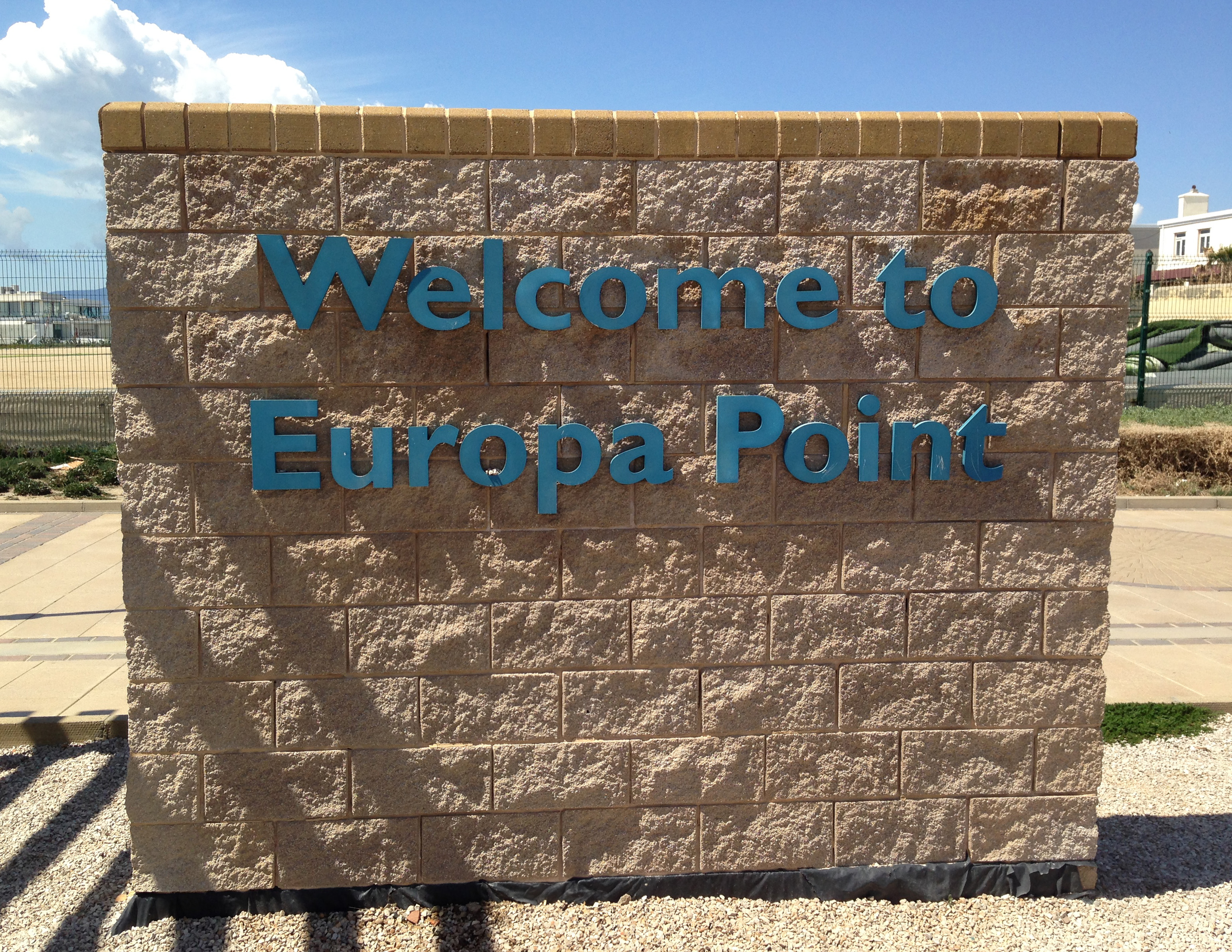
Europa Point Sign

Europa Point (Spanish and Llanito: Punta de Europa or Punta Europa) is the southernmost point of Gibraltar. Although not the southernmost point of the Iberian Peninsula, Europa Point defines the boundary between the Straits of Gibraltar in the Atlantic Ocean, and the Alboran Sea within the Mediterranean. At the end of the Rock of Gibraltar, the area is flat and occupied by such features as a playing field and a few buildings. On a clear day, views of North Africa can be seen across the Strait of Gibraltar including Ceuta and the Rif Mountains of Morocco; as well as the Bay of Gibraltar and the Spanish towns along its shores. It is reached from the old town by Europa Road.

== Overview ==
There are five notable buildings, Harding's Battery, the Ibrahim-al-Ibrahim Mosque, the Roman Catholic Shrine of Our Lady of Europe, the Europa Point Lighthouse and the Nun's Well. Europa Point is also the location of Gibraltar's only dedicated cricket oval where the Gibraltar national cricket team play and since 2013 Europa Point has been the location of the Sikorski Memorial.

Europa Point is linked with the Eastern side of the Rock, including Sandy Bay and Catalan Bay, via Dudley Ward Tunnel. The tunnel re-opened in 2010 after eight years closure following a fatal rockfall.

The Government of Gibraltar spent £4.4 million on refurbishing Europa Point in 2011 and it was opened by the then Chief Minister of Gibraltar Peter Caruana. In 2013 an original RML 12.5 inch 38 ton gun was mounted on a custom made replica carriage at Harding's Battery and the memorial to General Wladislaw Sikorski was relocated here from Sir Herbert Miles Road.

== Notable buildings ==
=== Harding's Battery ===
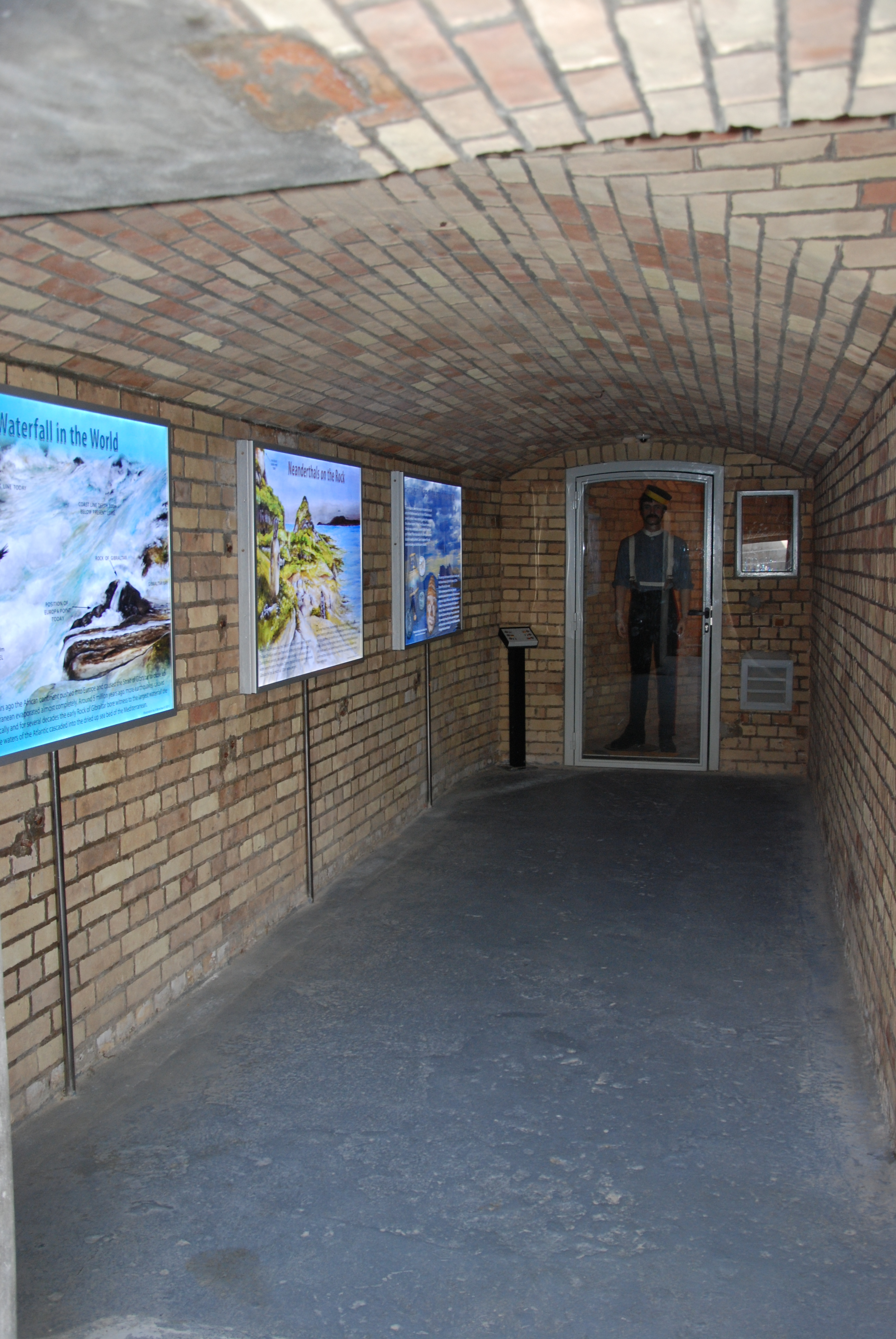
Europa Sunken Magazine today

Europa has been the site of Spanish and Moorish fortifications as well as those constructed by the British which added to the cliffs which were part of Gibraltar's natural defences. Additions included walls, the scarping of the rocks to remove foot and handholds and a large number of batteries supported by a local barracks. Today, Harding's Battery is central to the land at the end of the point. Built in the 19th century, this battery shows the scale of guns that could fire 800 pound projectiles over a foot in diameter over to the other side of the Straits of Gibraltar. The Europa Sunken Magazine that contained this ammunition is now a visitor centre.

=== Lighthouse ===
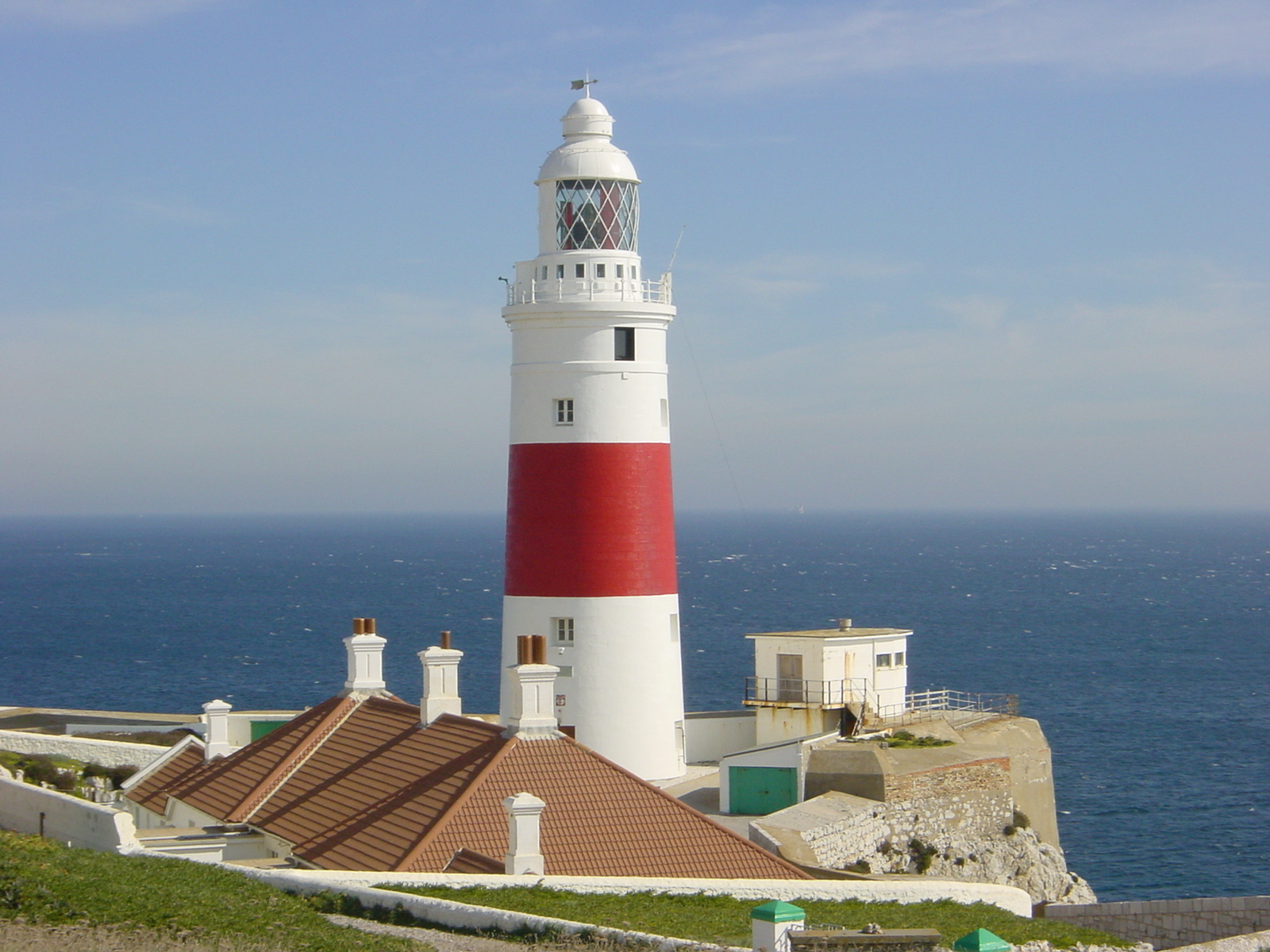
Europa Point Lighthouse

The Europa Point Lighthouse was built by Governor Sir Alexander Woodford between 1838 and 1841. It was fully automated in February 1994 and its loom can be seen over a distance of 27 km (17 mi). It is the southernmost lighthouse for which Trinity House is responsible, and the only one outside the British Isles.

Gibraltarians refer to it as "la farola" when conversing in Llanito. The Gibraltar Amateur Radio operators transmit from the area of the lighthouse.

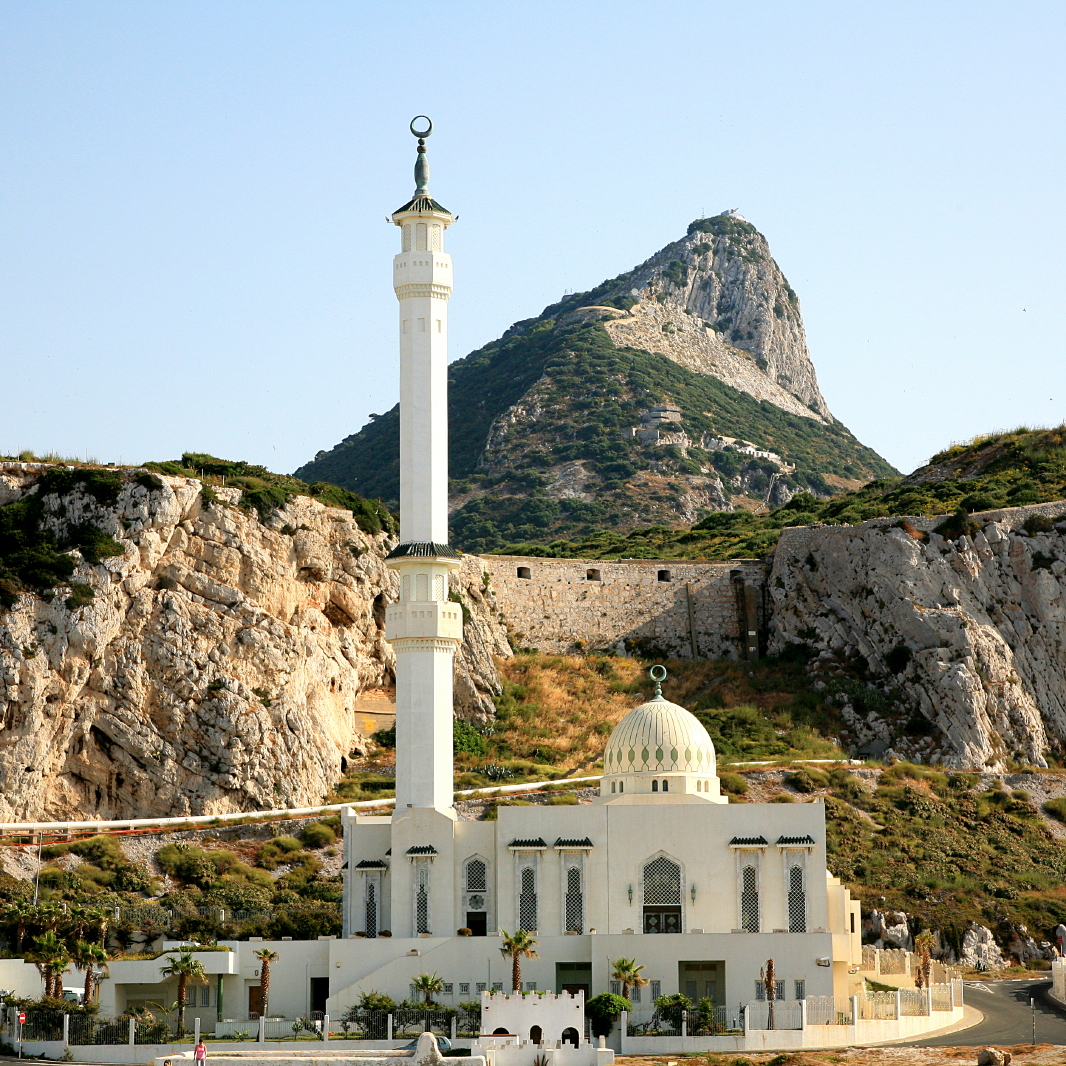
View of the Southern Face of the Mosque.

=== Ibrahim-al-Ibrahim Mosque ===
The mosque, also known as the King Fahd bin Abdulaziz al-Saud Mosque or the Mosque of the Custodian of the Two Holy Mosques, was a gift from King Fahd of Saudi Arabia and took two years to build at a cost of around £5 million. It was officially inaugurated on 8 August 1997. The mosque complex also contains a school, library, and lecture hall. It is the only purpose-built mosque in Gibraltar to serve the Muslims in the territory who number over 1,000.

=== Shrine of Our Lady of Europe ===
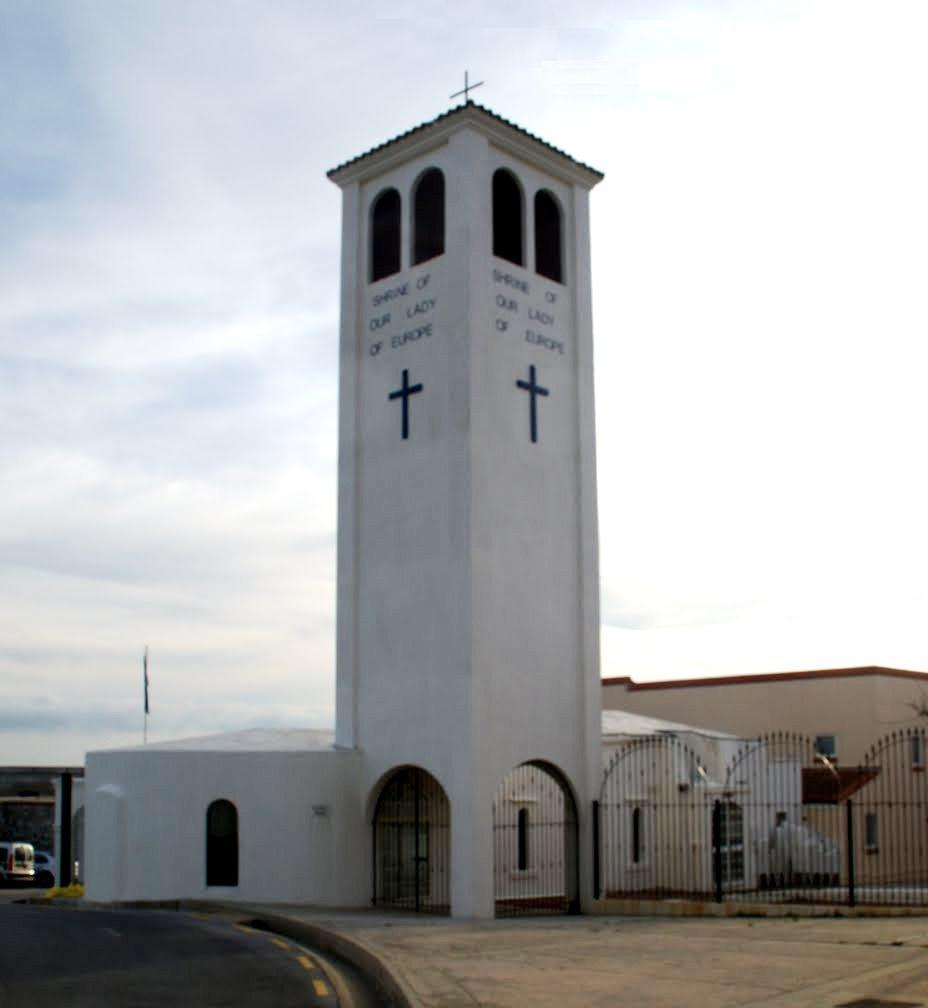
The Shrine of Our Lady of Europe.

On 20 August 1462, on St. Bernard of Clairvaux's feastday, the Spaniards under Don Rodrigo Ponce de León, recaptured Gibraltar from the Moors. They found a little mosque at Europa Point and converted it into a Christian shrine in honour of Our Lady as Patroness of Europe, with devout intention of consecrating to God, through Mary, the whole continent, from a place of prayer and worship at its southernmost point.

They built a large chapel at right angles to the mosque's east wall and the whole area became the Shrine of Our Lady of Europe. A statue of the Virgin and Child was installed in this shrine. The statue was quite small, only .6 m (2.0 ft) in height, carved in wood and polychromed in royal red, blue and gold. The Virgin was seated in a simple chair, with the Child Jesus on her lap. Both were crowned and the Virgin held in her right hand a sceptre with three flowers denoting Love, Truth and Justice. The shrine prospered in fame and popularity, for well over two centuries. Ships passing through the Strait saluted Our Lady as they passed Europa Point and mariners often came ashore with gifts to the shrine. Provisions were made by them for a constant supply of oil so that a light could be kept burning not only in front of the image but also in the tower.

In 1979 Pope John Paul II officially approved the title of Our Lady of Europe as Patroness of Gibraltar, and subsequently, the shrine was restored.

=== Nun's Well ===
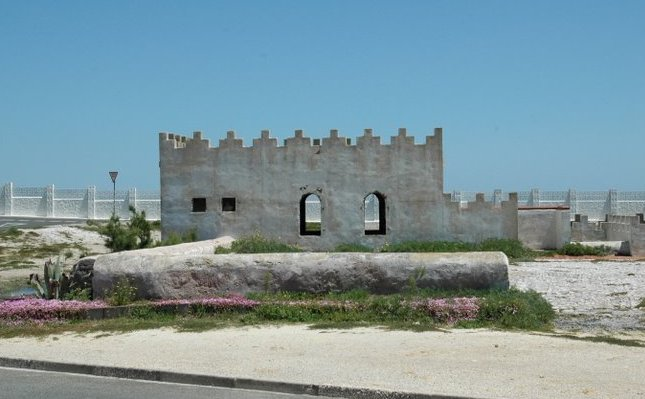
Nun's Well, Europa Point, Gibraltar

Nun's Well is an old underground water store opposite the end of the Keightley Way Tunnel. The water was used in the nineteenth century to make beer. In 1988 the buildings were repaired in order that it could be used by visitors to Gibraltar.

== Gallery ==
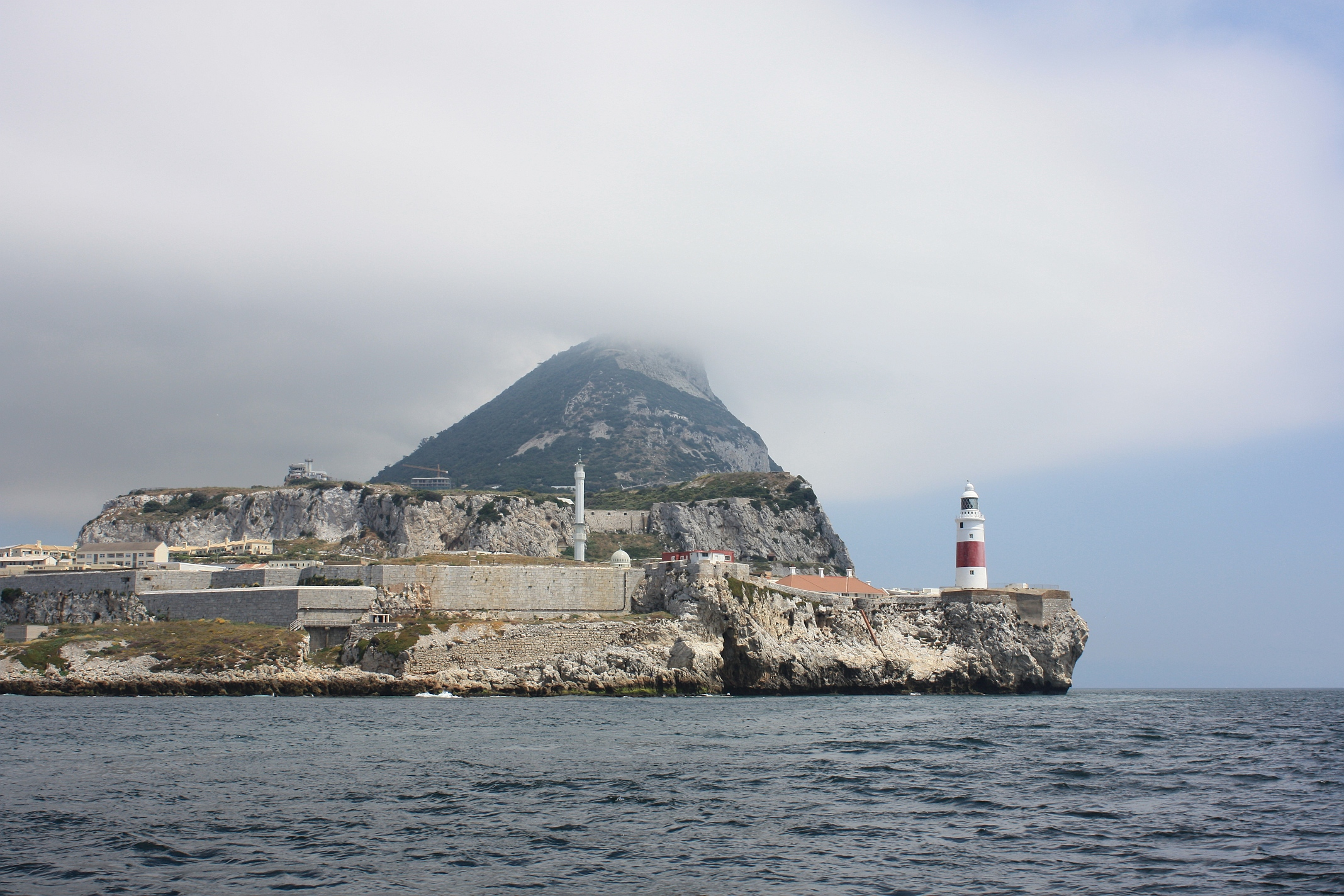
View of Europa Point and the Rock of Gibraltar from the Strait of Gibraltar. Levante Cloud overhead.

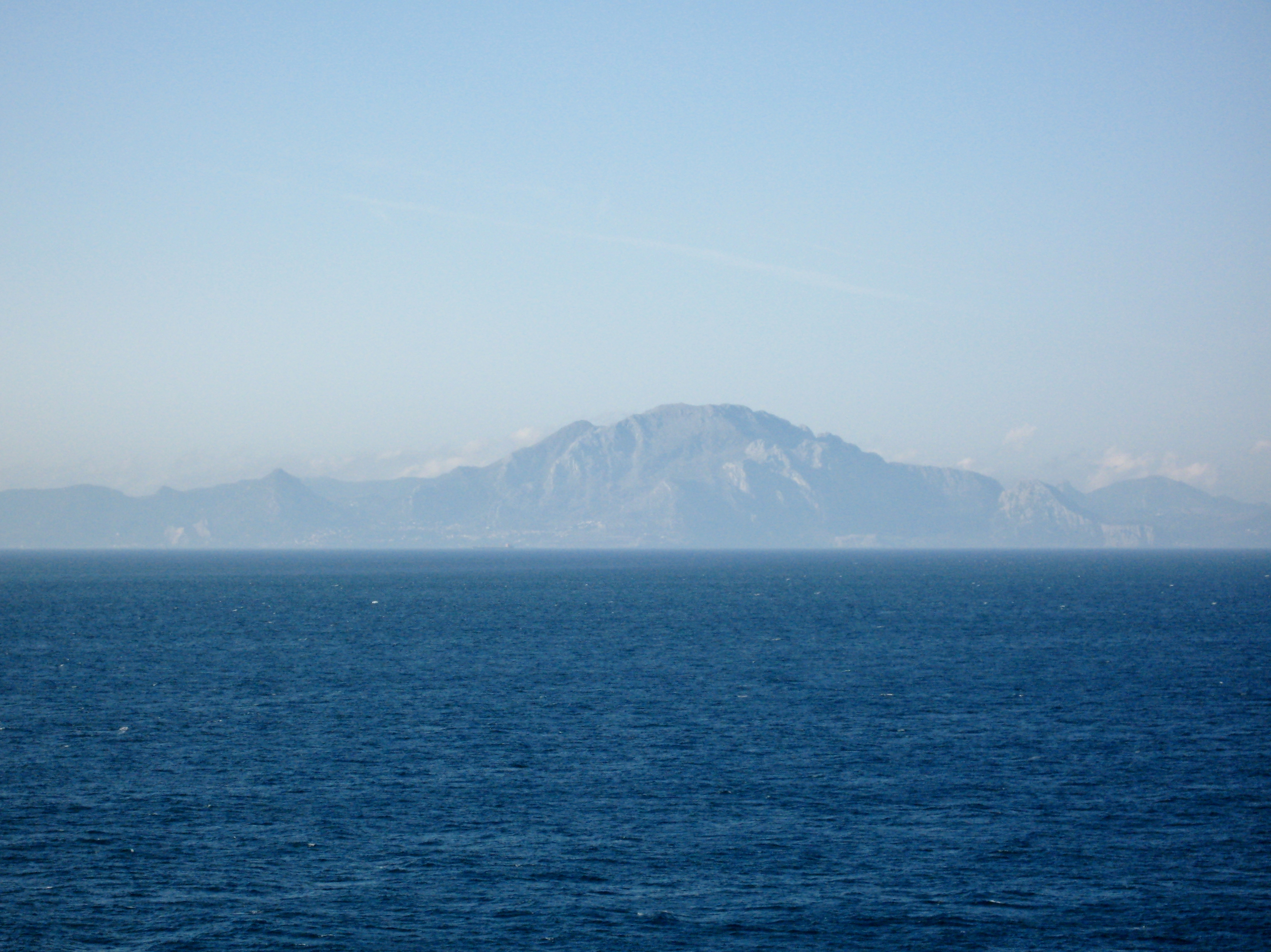
View of the Rif mountains in Morocco across the Strait of Gibraltar from Europa Point.

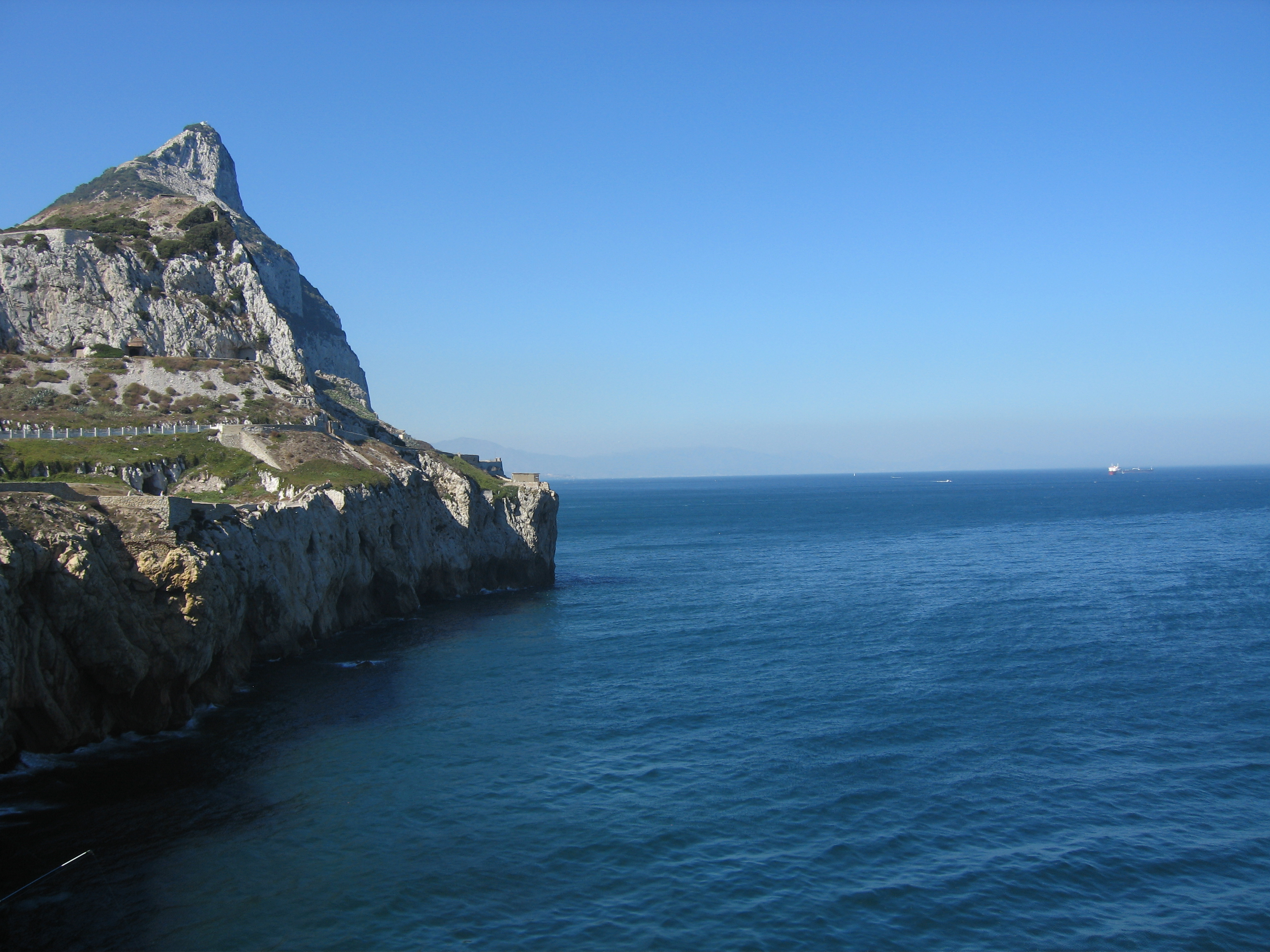
Europa Point toward Mediterranean sea

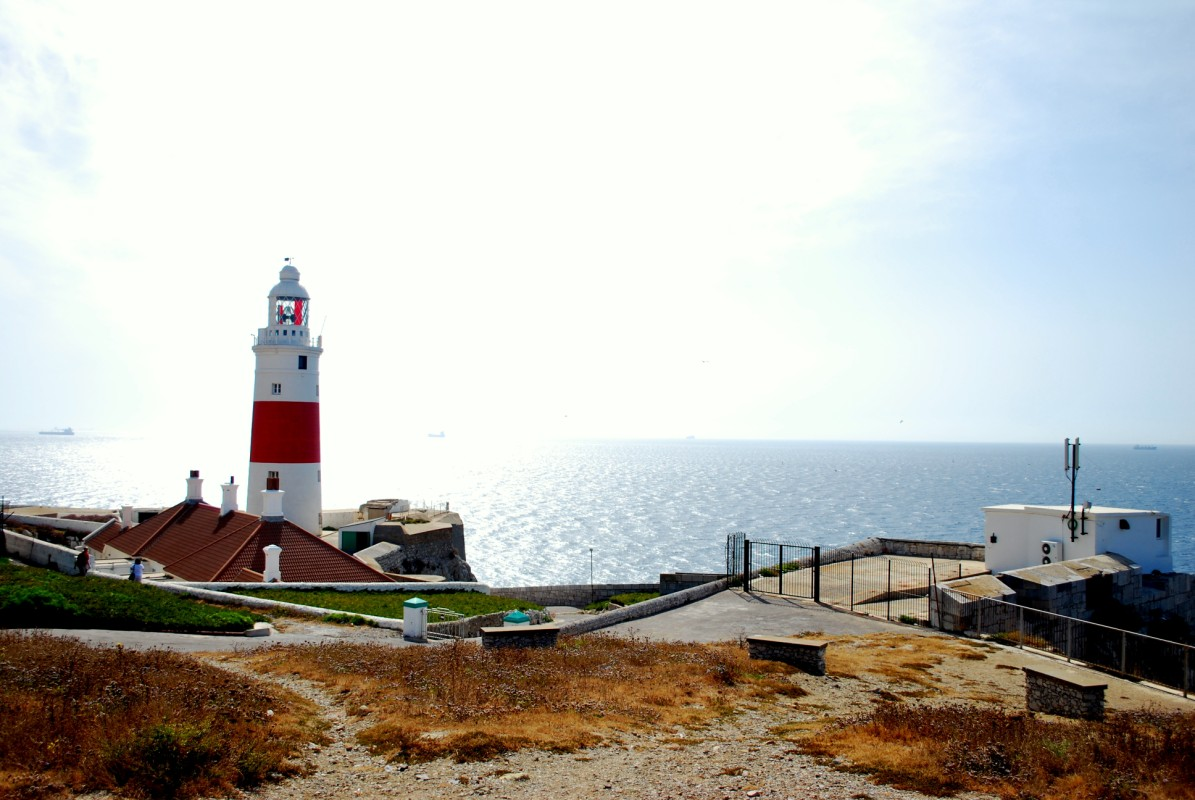
Europa Point Lighthouse

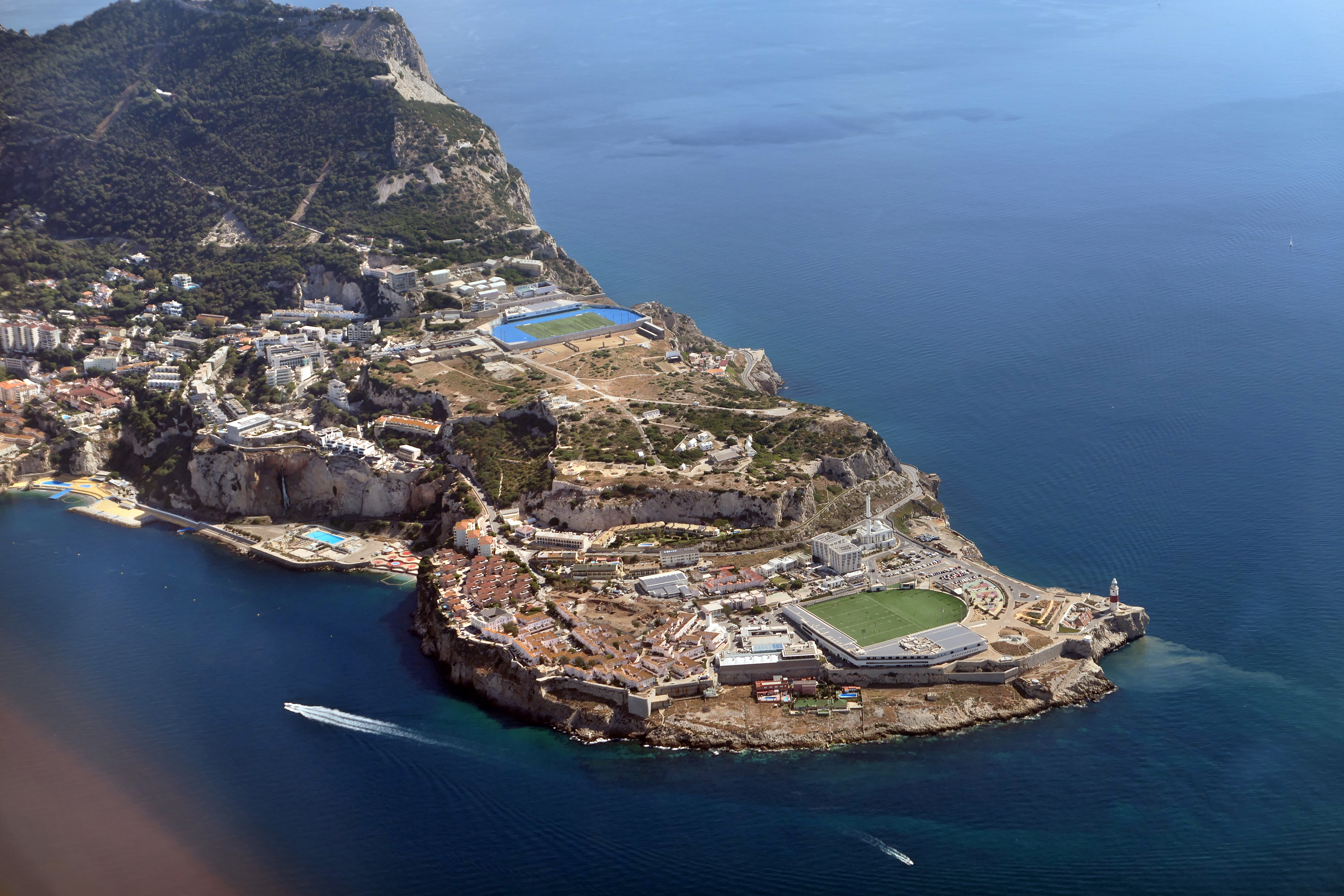
An aerial view.

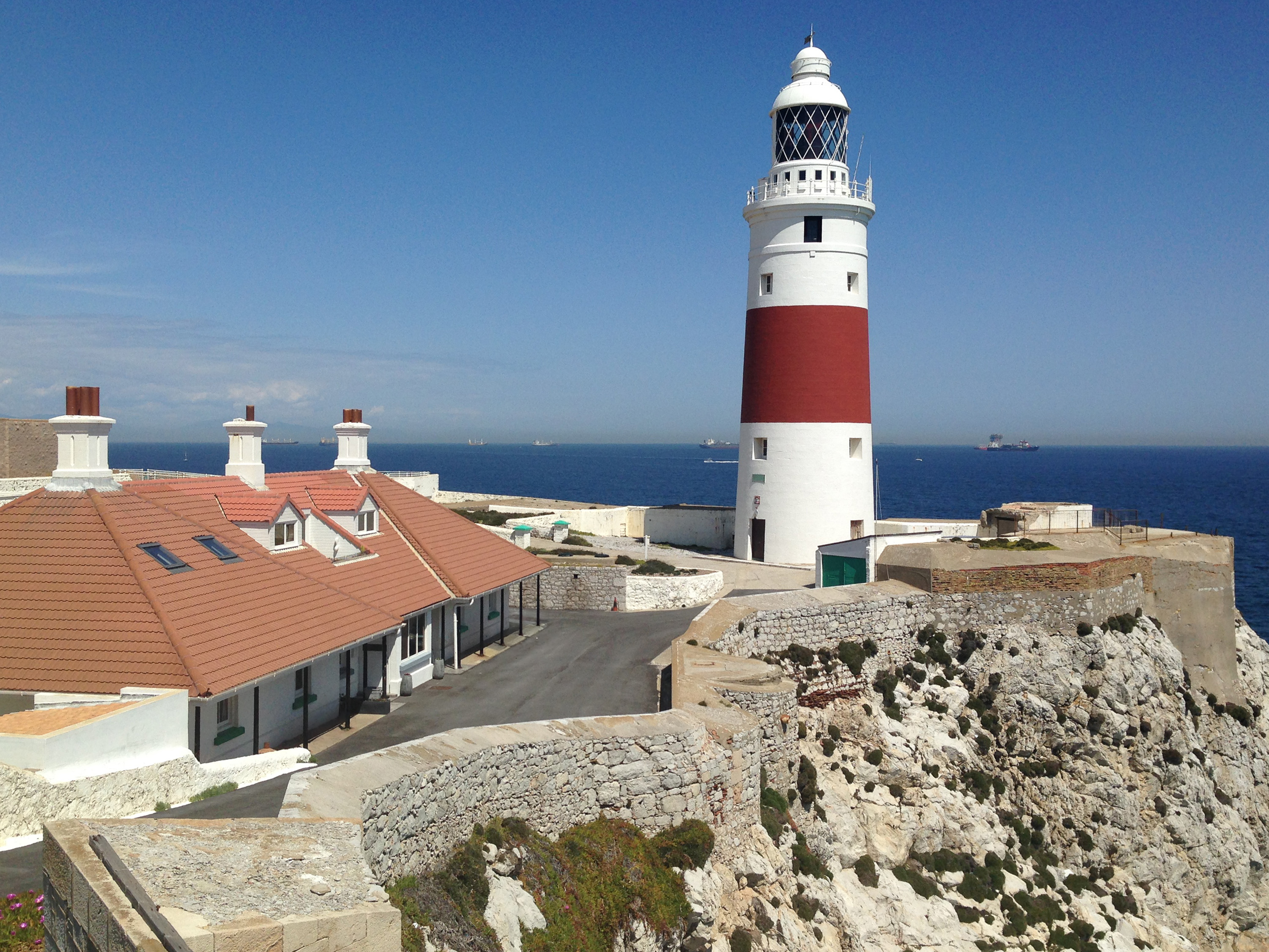
Europa Point Lighthouse

== See also ==
- MV Fedra
- MV New Flame
- Punta Carnero, Spain
- Europa Point Stadium

== Literature ==
- Ferrer‐Gallardo, X., & Van Houtum, H. (2013). Europe without an Endpoint. Period. Tijdschrift voor economische en sociale geografie, 104(2), 243-249.
