= Our Lady of Europe =

Catholic Marian title from Gibraltar

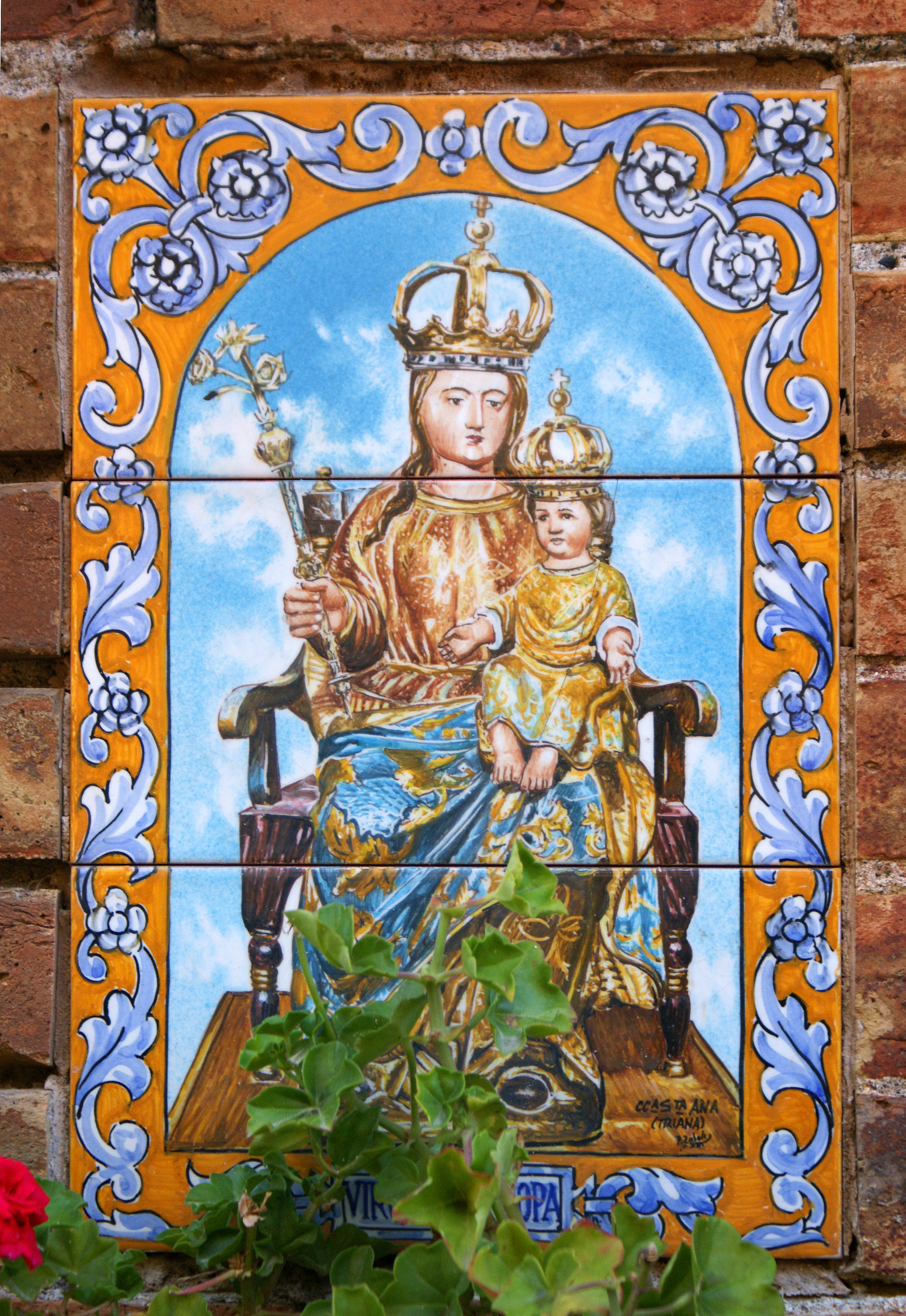
- Gibraltar plaques - Our Lady of Europe, Gibraltar.
- Venerated in: Catholic Church
- Major shrine: Shrine of Our Lady of Europe
- Feast: 5 May (Europe Day) since 1979; previously it was celebrated on 30 May and 15 August
- Patronage: Patroness of Gibraltar; Protectress of Europe

Our Lady of Europe (Spanish: Nuestra Señora de Europa or Virgen de Europa) is a title given to the Blessed Virgin Mary as patroness of Gibraltar and protectress of Europe. The entire European continent was consecrated under the protection of Our Lady of Europe in the early 14th century from the Shrine in Gibraltar where devotion continues to this day, over 700 years on.

Together with Saint Bernard of Clairvaux, Our Lady is a Catholic patron saint of Gibraltar, and as such protector of the whole of Europe.

== Background ==
The peninsula now known as Gibraltar was at one time called Calpe. Gibraltar takes its name from the phrase Gibel Tarik, which means "the Mountain of Tarik", and commemorates the capture of the peninsula by Tarik Ibn Zayid in 710. Muslim troops built a fortress and a mosque at Europa Point at the southernmost part of Gibraltar, located just across from the North African coast.

== Devotion in Gibraltar ==
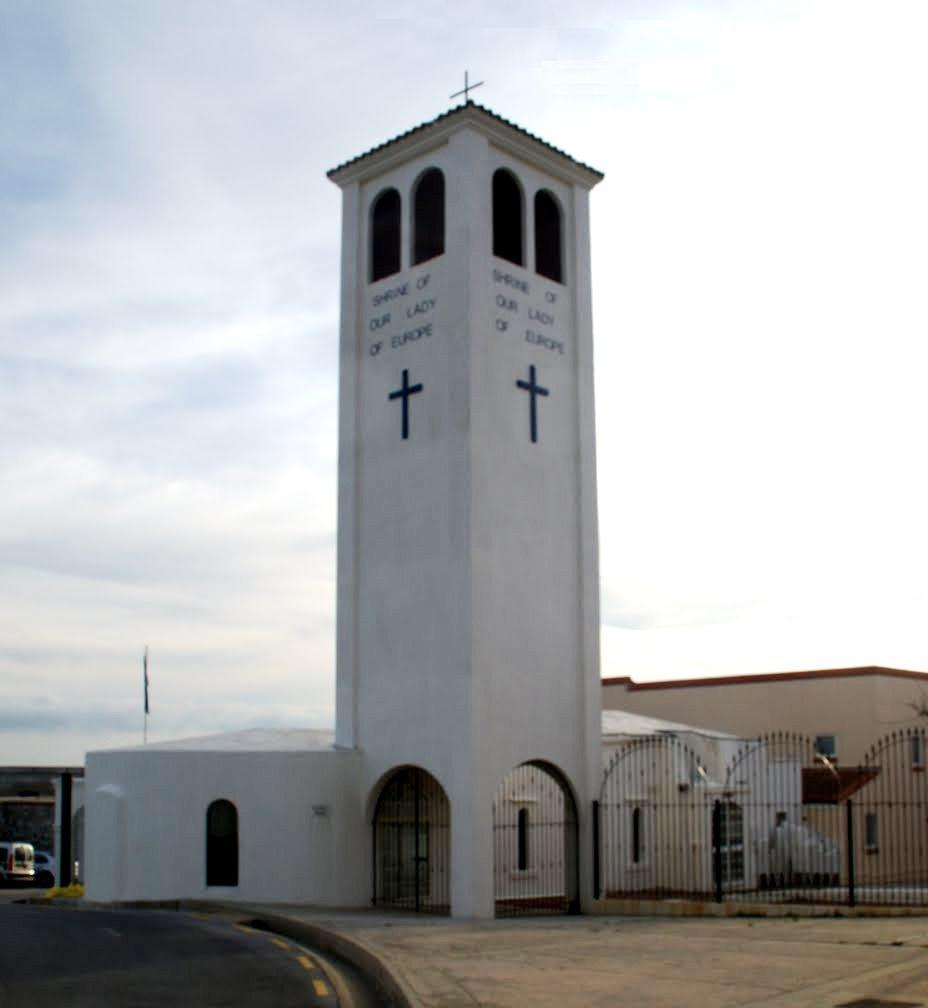
Shrine of Our Lady of Europe, at Europa Point, Gibraltar.

=== Origins during the Spanish period ===
In 1309, King Ferdinand IV of Castile took Gibraltar, driving the Muslim troops back across the strait to Africa. The King converted the ancient mosque into a Christian Shrine. The Muslims again captured Gibraltar 24 years later in 1333. In 1462 King Henry IV recaptured Gibraltar and restored the devotion to Our Lady of Europe initiated by his grandfather, Ferdinand, once again transforming the ancient mosque into a Christian Shrine.

Ceuta, on the southern shore of the Strait of Gibraltar, had been captured in 1415 by the Portuguese, under King John I. In 1421 the King's son, Henry the Navigator, sent a Holy Virgin's statue to Ceuta in order to consecrate Africa to the Blessed Virgin Mary under the invocation of Our Lady of Africa. That way, each of the two Pillars of Hercules was the site of a Marian shrine, consecrating both continents to Our Lady.

A chapel was later built over the remains of the mosque and the whole area became known as the Shrine of Our Lady of Europe (Spanish: Santuario de Nuestra Señora de Europa). A statue of the Virgin and Child was installed in there in the 15th century. The statue was quite small, only two feet in height, carved in wood and polychromed in royal red, blue and gold. The Virgin was seated in a simple chair, with the Child Jesus on her lap. Both were crowned and the Virgin held in her right hand a sceptre with three flowers denoting Love, Truth and Justice.

On September 10, 1540, Gibraltar suffered a raid by Barbarossa's Barbary corsairs. The Shrine was pillaged and the statue of Our Lady badly mutilated and broken into pieces. It was eventually restored in Seville and brought back to the Shrine.

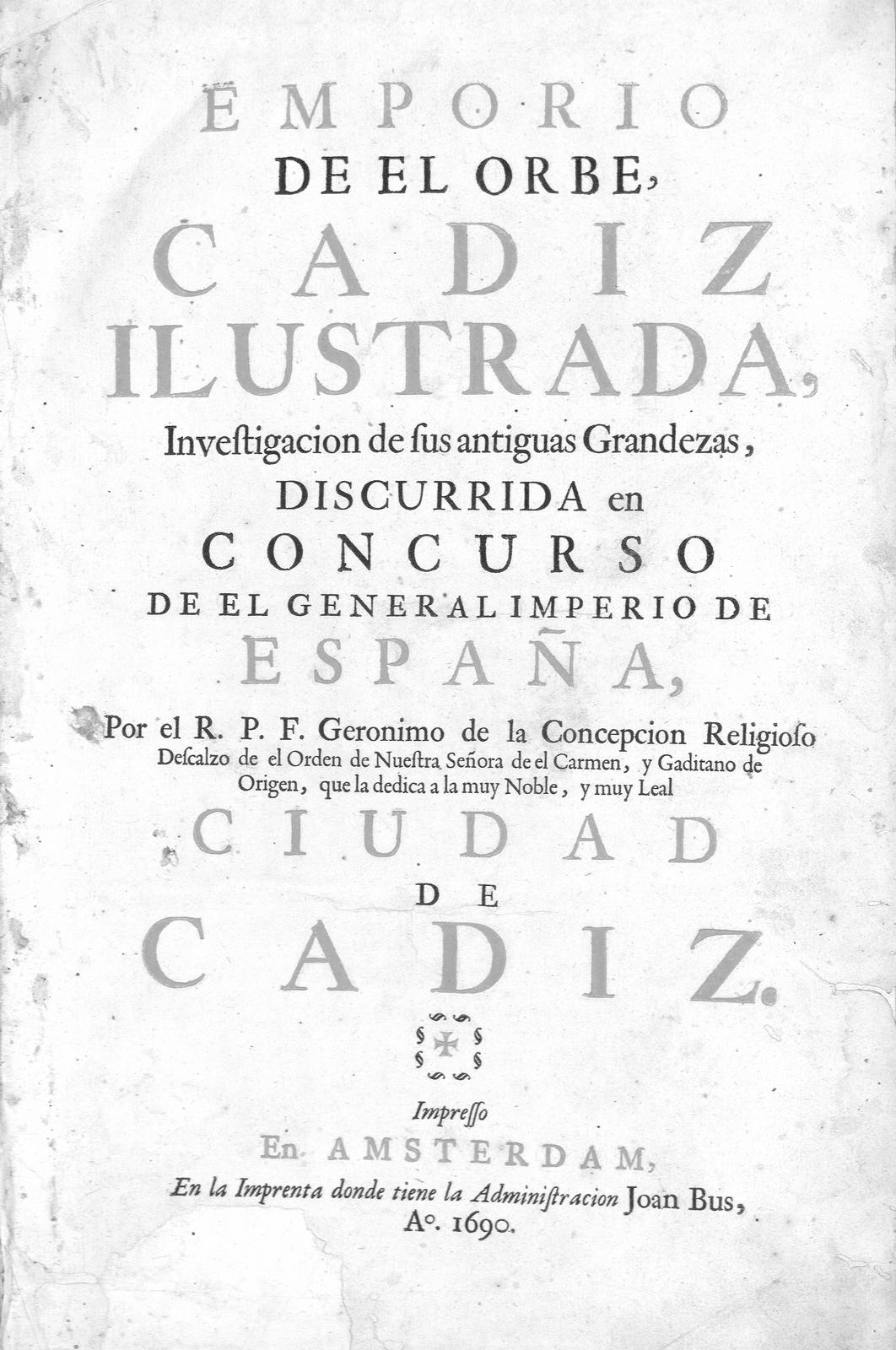
Front cover of Cadiz Ilustrada (1690), a work by Fray Jerónimo de la Concepción where he describes various claims of miracles in Gibraltar attributed to Our Lady of Europe.

The shrine prospered in fame and popularity, for well over two centuries. Ships passing through the Strait of Gibraltar saluted Our Lady as they passed Europa Point and mariners often came ashore with offerings for the shrine. Provision was made for a supply of oil to keep a lamp burning in the shrine tower (former minaret), thus making it a navigational beacon. Notable gifts include a silver lamp, given in 1568 by Giovanni Andrea Doria (great-nephew of the great Genoese admiral Andrea Doria), and two massive silver lamps presented by John of Austria, upon his victory at the Battle of Lepanto.

Alonso Hernández del Portillo, a councilor from Gibraltar during late 16th and early 17th century and first chronicler of the city, narrates in his Historia de la Muy Noble y Más Leal Ciudad de Gibraltar (1610–22) (English: History of the Very Noble and Most Loyal City of Gibraltar) the story of many other declared miracles attributed to Our Lady of Europe, one of them having been witnessed by himself. Another historian, Fray Jerónimo de la Concepción, in his work Cadiz Ilustrada (1690), also records many such miracles which occurred in Gibraltar.

One notable miracle was that of fisherman Luis Lecayo in 1633. He was caught in a heavy storm at night, thrown into the turbulent sea, and considered himself lost only praying to Our Lady of Europe for help. He survived and later gave his account of the claimed miracle to the Bishop of Cádiz, Domingo Cano de Haro, who promoted devotion to Our Lady within the Diocese of Cádiz.

A confraternity, the Confraternity of Our Lady of Europe (Spanish: Cofradía de Nuestra Señora de Europa), was later established. A larger statue of Our Lady of Europe was specifically carved and enthroned in the town's central church, the Church of St. Mary the Crowned and St. Bernard (Spanish: Iglesia de Santa Maria la Coronada y San Bernado, presently the Cathedral of the Roman Catholic Diocese of Gibraltar). The confraternity was disestablished some time after 1704.

=== The Capture of Gibraltar ===
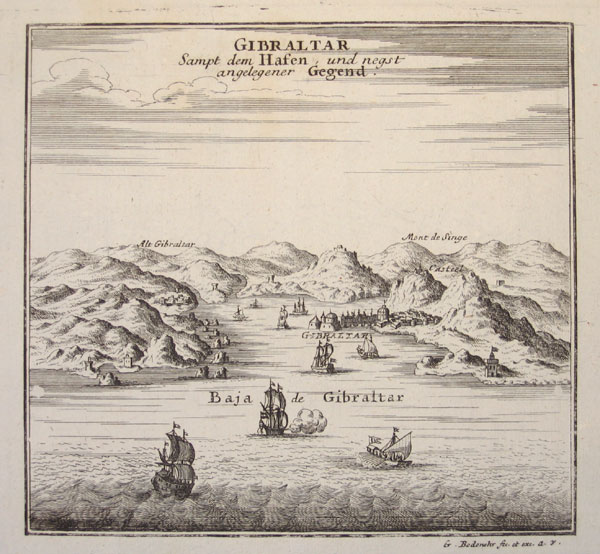
Gibraltar c. 1704. The Shrine of Our Lady of Europe can be seen in the foreground on the right-hand side.

In 1704, during the War of the Spanish Succession, Anglo-Dutch troops captured Gibraltar. The shrine, as most other Catholic places of worship was desecrated and was taken over for military use. The shrine was looted and the statue of the Virgin and Child was broken and its remains thrown out to sea. As the statue was carved from wood, the pieces were recovered by a fisherman who found them floating in the Bay of Gibraltar and later delivered them to Juan Romero de Figueroa, the priest in charge at the Church of St. Mary the Crowned and St. Bernard, who took the pieces of the statue to Algeciras for safekeeping. They were placed in the Chapel of St. Bernard, which was then dedicated to Our Lady of Europe and named (Spanish: Capilla de Nuestra Señora de Europa).

=== Consolidation during the British period ===
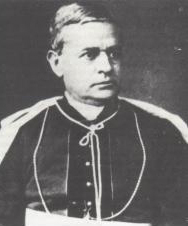
Vicar Apostolic John Baptist Scandella arranged for the return of the original statue to Gibraltar.

The Great Siege of Gibraltar was an unsuccessful attempt by Spain and France to capture Gibraltar from the British. It lasted three years and seven months from 1779 to 1783 and caused great damage to the town. The old shrine was no exception, and this eventually led to its demolition. A replica of the statue had been made to replace the original, held in Algeciras. The copy was kept at the Cathedral of St. Mary the Crowned and St. Bernard, but when the church came under bombardment it relocated to Windmill Hill. After the end of the siege, the statue returned to the cathedral.

In the early 1860s, the Vicar Apostolic of Gibraltar, John Baptist Scandella, petitioned for the return of the original statue from Algeciras. The Bishop of Cadiz and the Primate of Spain were involved in the discussions, and eventually a solution acceptable to all parties was agreed upon. The original statue was to return to Gibraltar as requested so long as an exact replica would be carved and placed in the Chapel of Our Lady of Europe in Algeciras. According to the terms of the compromise, a new statue was carved in Seville. At the same time the original statue repaired by the same craftsman. The original statue was eventually returned to Gibraltar in 1864.

As the Shrine of Our Lady of Europe remained in military hands, the statue was provisionally placed in the Loreto Convent, at the time located in front of the governor's official residence in Main Street. Scandella aimed to house the statue as near to Europa Point as possible. After a popular fundraising campaign, a site was acquired along Engineer Road. The statue was paraded from the Loreto Convent to its new location in a procession lined on both sides by soldiers. The statue was carried shoulder-high on a bier, accompanied by a military band. The ceremony was devised as a reparation act for the 1704 desecration. The new chapel was of simple design and later included a marble altar donated by Pope Pius IX. Scandella attended the First Vatican Council (1869–1870) as Council Father. During his stay in Rome, Scandella succeeded in bringing the Shrine of Our Lady of Europe to the attention of the Pope, thus the donation of the altar. Its front piece depicted the Coat of arms of Pope Pius IX and that of Bishop Scandella, together with a monogram of Our Lady of Europe. The statue of Our Lady was enthroned on this altar. During World War II, the statue was returned to the cathedral for safekeeping. During this time, the Child, which had to be dressed in brocade silk according to the liturgical season, was replaced by a newly carved dressed Bambino sculptured by Francisco Moreira. After the war, the statue was once again relocated, this time to St. Joseph's Parish Church, the closest church to Europa Point.

In the meantime, during the bishopric of Richard Joseph Fitzgerald, extensive developments in the Cathedral of St. Mary the Crowned were accomplished. Bishop Fitzgerald decided to replace the statue of Our Lady of Europe in order to make the two side-altars symmetrical. As the right altar had an upright statue of the Sacred Heart of Jesus, a similar statue was desired for the left one (where the old statue of Our Lady of Europe was placed). The new statue was manufactured in France, and put in the altar where the old statue stood, but the faithful never held it in the same esteem as the old one, which was stored away. In 1965, Charles Caruana (later Bishop of Gibraltar, then the priest responsible of the cathedral's sacristy) rediscovered the lost statue in a store. It was however, damaged due to humidity and an arm and hand had become detached. After restoration, the statue was placed in the Cathedral sacristy. It was Bishop Bernard Devlin who in 1986 reinstalled the statue in its original location, where it remains to this day.

The building erected at the place of the old Shrine of Our Lady of Europe remained property of the British Ministry of Defence until 1961. It had been an army storehouse for oil and packing case. Since 1928 it had been used as a library for the garrison, but with the outbreak of World War II, it was returned to a storage facility. By 1959, the military authorities, which had begun to withdraw many military installations in Gibraltar, noticed that it was no longer required and decided to demolish it. However, this never happened and due to the efforts of Bishop John Healy it was ceded to the Catholic diocese on 17 October 1961, in a private ceremony. Restoration works began in 1962. For the first time in 258 years, a mass was celebrated at the Shrine on 28 September 1962. The statue was finally transferred to the Shrine in public procession from St. Joseph's Parish Church on 7 October 1967. The statue of Our Lady remains in the Shrine to this day.

Bishop Edward Rapallo was responsible for making Our Lady of Europe the principal Patroness of Gibraltar and for changing the feast day to Europe Day (5 May). With regard to the former, he officially asked the Sacred Congregation for the Evangelisation of Peoples to intercede for its petition with the Pope John Paul II. On 31 May 1979 the Pope approved "Our Blessed Lady as the Principal Patroness of the Diocese of Gibraltar, under the title of Our Lady of Europe". Regarding the feast day, by linking it with Europe Day, he aimed to highlight the relevance of Our Lady of Europe in modern times. The feast day had been celebrated on 15 August (the feast day of the Assumption of Mary) from Spanish times until Scandella's episcopate in the mid-19th century, when it was changed to 30 May. Authorisation for the celebration on 5 May was granted by the Holy See also in 1979.

In 2002, on the occasion of his ad limina visit to Rome, Bishop Caruana took with him the statue of Our Lady of Europe, for the Pope John Paul II to bless and crown her. He also presented the Pope with a replica of the statue as a gift. Today, it can be found at the Casa Romana del Clero.

Since its establishment in 2003, the Shrine of Our Lady of Europe belongs to the European Marian Network, which links twenty Marian sanctuaries in Europe (as many as the number of decades in the Rosary).

=== Septcentenary of the devotion to Our Lady of Europe ===
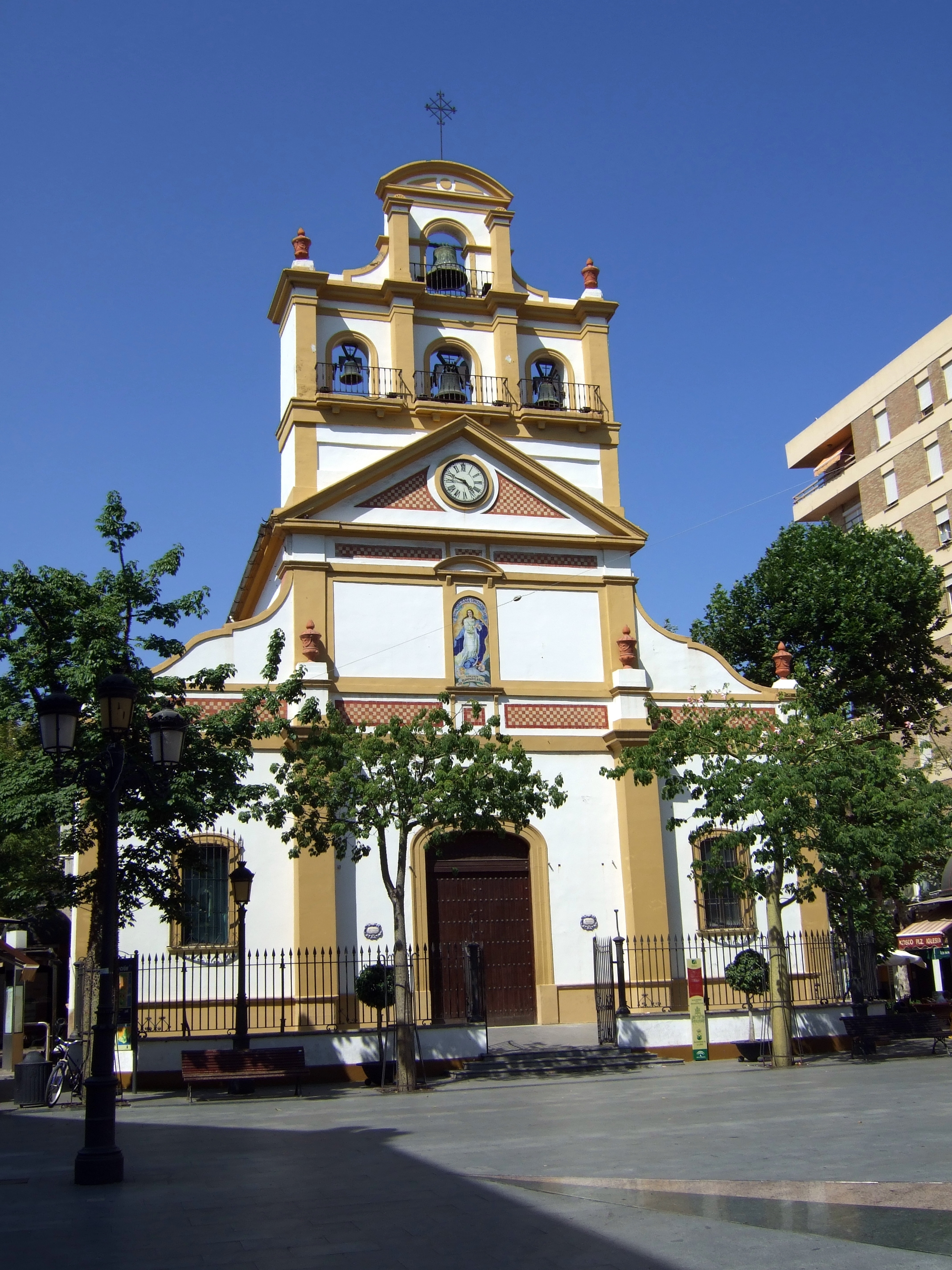
Façade of the Church of the Immaculate Conception, where a copy of the statue of Our Lady of Europe was placed in 2009, during the celebration of the jubilee.

Although historians acknowledge the consecration of the pre-existing mosque as a Christian shrine in the first Christian occupation (1309–1333), it is not clear that its consecration to Our Lady of Europe took place during this same period. Despite this, the Diocese of Gibraltar asserts that the original consecration did take place during this short Christian occupation of the territory, in 1309, under the rule of King Ferdinand IV and not during the second Christian occupation which began in 1462. Therefore, Bishop Caruana requested the Holy See to authorised a jubilee year to be celebrated on the 7th centenary of the foundation of devotion to Our Lady of Europe. The authorisation was duly granted by the Pope Benedict XVI and the Bishop Caruana opened a "jubilee year" on 12 May 2008, with a Solemn Mass. The Pope granted an "indulgence" to faithful to Our Lady who fulfilled certain requisites.

The jubilee celebrations included processions, masses and various other acts of devotion. On 5 May, the feast day of Our Lady of Europe, a solemn High Mass took place in a marquee outside the shrine, with the attendance of a delegation of some 70 leading senior ecclesiastical figures from across Europe. Civil representatives included Chief Minister Peter Caruana, Governor Sir Adrian Johns, Leader of the Opposition Joe Bossano and other members of the Gibraltar Parliament, Mayor Solomon Levy as well as the Spanish mayor of La Línea Alejandro Sánchez García. The statue of Our Lady of Europe was brought in procession from the Shrine at Europa Point. During the mass, the Shrine and the Roman Catholic Diocese in Gibraltar received the Golden Rose, a rare gift bestowed by the Pope. The Continent was re-consecrated to Our Lady of Europe.

Celebrations also involved cross-border elements. A procession took place on April 27 from Gibraltar to the bordering Spanish municipality of La Línea de la Concepción. It was led by Bishop Caruana, and Mayor Solomon Levy and it carried the gift of a replica statue of Our Lady of Europe. The procession was met on the Spanish side of the border by an ecclesiastical delegation led by the Bishop of Cádiz and Ceuta comprising all the congregations of La Línea, including its mayor, one from Marbella and another from Castellar de la Frontera. The procession concluded in the Church of the Immaculate Conception (Spanish: Iglesia de la Inmaculada Concepción), La Linea's main church, and an open-air mass was celebrated. Some days earlier, a pilgrimage of Spanish worshipers proceeded from La Línea to the Shrine of Our Lady of Europe in Gibraltar. On April 15, Bishop Caruana had held a conference in San Roque with the title "Our Lady of Europe: 700 years of history of the devotion of this land to the Mother of God". According to Bishop Caruana, the celebrations opened up an opportunity "to strengthen links with the dioceses of Málaga and Cádiz, and with the municipalities of the Campo. The Eucharist (.) was very emotional [for him]".

In addition to these celebrations, Bishop Caruana authored the book History of Our Lady of Europe, published by the Vatican Press as part of the commemoration. A joint issue of postage stamps Gibraltar and the Vatican City also formed part of the jubilee celebrations (only in 1966, a Gibraltar stamp had been devoted to Our Lady of Europe). A commemorative 50p coin, and a silver medal were also issued.

In March 2010, an International Marian Congress was to be held in Gibraltar, with the themes Mary, a sign of Christian identity; religion, anthropology, history and art. Its object, according to Bishop Charles Caruana, is:

..to disseminate the importance of Marian devotion to the image of Our Lady of Europa through its history and the artistic legacy that has developed around it; and that it should become the centre of studies of the figure of the Virgin Mary from the standpoint of faith, art, history and anthropology.

=== Hymn ===
La Plegaria a la Virgen de Europa (English: The Hymn to Our Lady of Europe) is a traditional Spanish language hymn about Our Lady of Europe. It was composed in the late 1950s with music by Louis Diaz and lyrics by Elio Cruz (the author of the famous plays La Lola se va pá Londre and Connie con cama camera en el comedor). It was first performed by the group Los Trovadores in 1958 at the Theatre Royal. The hymn has become part of the popular culture of Gibraltar and has been compared to the patriotic song Llévame Donde Nací in the way Gibraltarians identify with it. The hymn was written during the years following the evacuation of the civilian population of Gibraltar during World War II and its repatriation (which ended in 1951). During this difficult time, the devotion to Our Lady of Europe by the Gibraltarian evacuees strengthened.

The Plegaria was traditionally performed live as the last song (before God Save The Queen) on Radio Gibraltar's open day. When the event transferred to GBC Television, the tradition continued for several years. After its first performances, it was recorded by other groups, such as The Peninsulares, who kept the song alive as part of their repertoire. Followed by the Valerga Brothers or Louis Caballero. Throughout the years it has been sung in local churches, excursions and popular events.

Although not on purpose, it was re-recorded in 2009 during the jubilee year celebrating the septcentenary of the devotion to Our Lady of Europe.

== Devotion beyond Gibraltar ==
=== In Algeciras ===
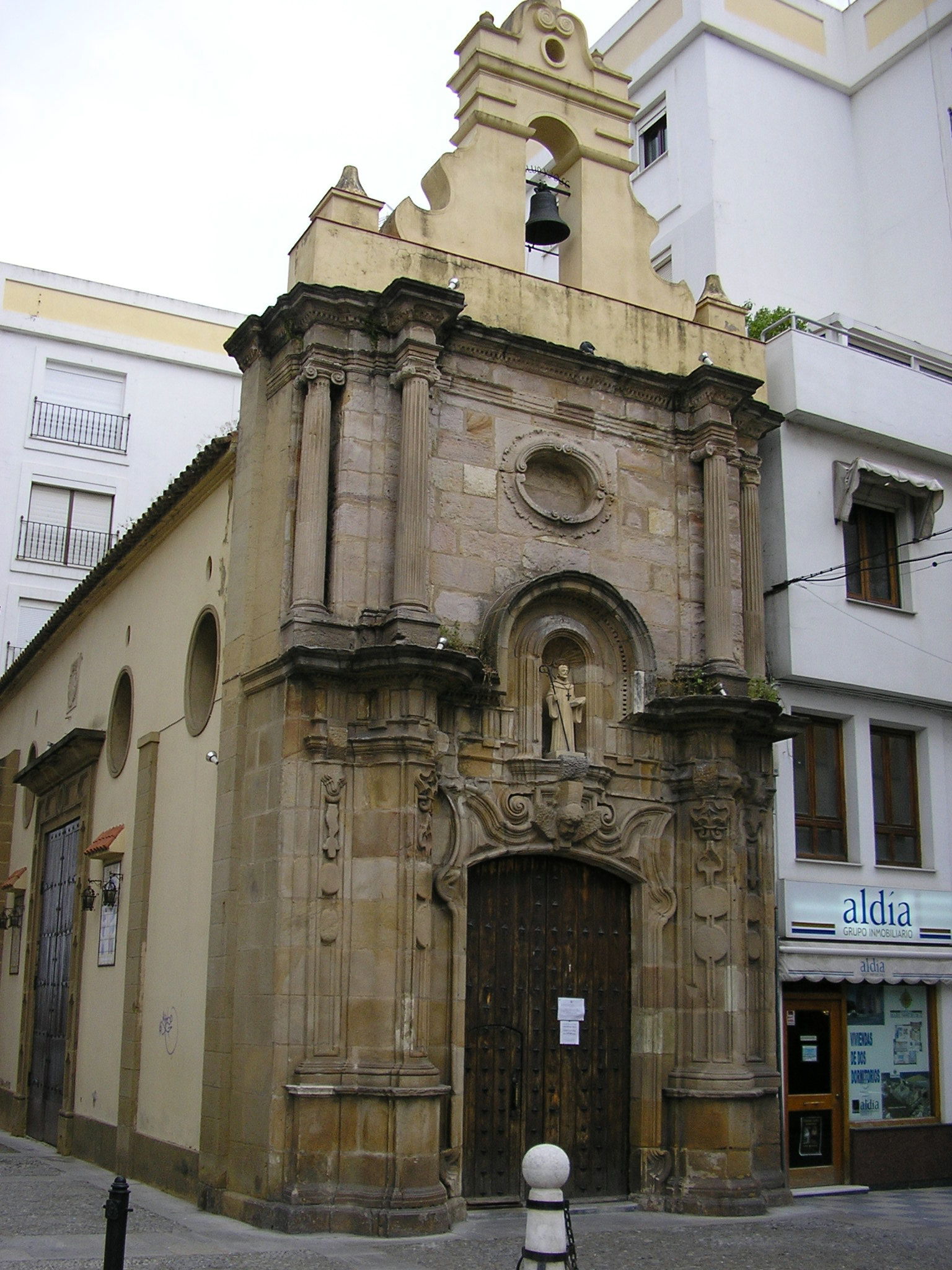
The Chapel of Europe (Spanish: Capillita de Europa) in Algeciras.

After the Capture of Gibraltar by the Anglo-Dutch fleet, almost all the inhabitants of the town left it and settled down in different locations within the Campo. While most did it around the hermitage of Saint Roch (what nowadays is San Roque, others established themselves in Los Barrios or in the remains of Algeciras, around the Chapel of St. Bernard, patron saint of Gibraltar and its Campo, which was located in the cortijo (farm) of one of the wealthiest families of Gibraltar, the Gálvez, in 1690. As described above, the statue of Our Lady of Europe venerated in Gibraltar had been taken to Algeciras for safekeeping after being desecrated. It was placed in said Chapel, which was then dedicated then to Our Lady of Europe and named Chapel of Our Lady of Europe (Spanish: Capilla de Nuestra Señora de Europa).

The chapel became parish church in 1721, and remained so until 1736, when its function was taken over by the neighbouring Church of Our Lady of the Palm (Spanish: Iglesia de Nuestra Señora de la Palma). Devotion to Our Lady of Europe continued, especially because of the role of the Chapel in the re-establishment of the town and the presence of the original statue of Our Lady in the church. In 1769 it was rebuilt, as the original building was severely affected by the 1755 Lisbon earthquake and had to be demolished. The statue did not suffer any damages. In 1864, after the petition of the Vicar Apostolic of Gibraltar, John Baptist Scandella, the original statue returned to Gibraltar, and an exact replica was carved and placed in the Chapel of Our Lady of Europe. This remains dedicated to Our Lady of Europe up to this day.

=== In Medina Sidonia ===
The devotion to Our Lady of Europe dates from the time Gibraltar was a seigneury belonging to the House of Medina Sidonia. Since then, the troops of the House have always carried a statue of Our Lady in their missions. At present, a statue of Our Lady of Europe is venerated in the cloistered Convent of the Augustinians Recollects in Medina Sidonia under the name of "La Galeota". It's a replica of the original statue of Our Lady in Gibraltar.

=== In Seville ===
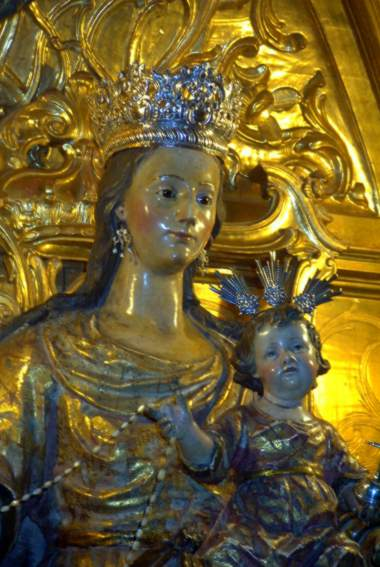
The statue of Our Lady of Europe with the Holy Child in the Church of Saint Martin, Seville.

Devotion in Seville began in the seventeenth century during the Spanish period of Gibraltar by inhabitants of the town which settled down near the parish church of St. Martin (Spanish: Iglesia Parroquial de San Martín). Initially, there was a small chapel dedicated to Our Lady of Europe, where a painting of Our Lady of Europe had been placed, enclosed in an Altarpiece. It was located in a square called Plaza de Europa (English: Europe Square). In 1695, a confraternity devoted to Our Lady of Europe (Spanish: La Muy Ilustre Hermandad de Nuestra Señora de Europa) was also created there where it participated in public devotions. About 1715 a statue was carved, possibly by Benito Hita del Castillo, and a new chapel-niche with the altarpiece was built. From an iconographic point of view, the statue resembled a piece of medieval art, as Our Lady is seated and wearing a crown. She has the Child Jesus on her left hand and holds in her right hand a flower. There could have been a former statue, from the seventeenth century.

During the eighteenth century, the confraternity developed an intense activity, celebrating Our Lady's feast day each 8 September as well as public daily praying of the rosary. In 1854, Our Lady's statue and painting were moved to its current location, the parish church of St. Martin. However, the confraternity held its last meeting in 1986 as devotion to Our Lady of Europe in Seville died out.

=== In Madrid and Barcelona ===
The Gibraltar priest Diego de Astorga y Céspedes, born in 1664, was the main person accountable for spreading the devotion to Our Lady of Europe to the Spanish capitals of Madrid and Barcelona. De Astorga was ordained Bishop of Barcelona in 1717 and Archbishop of Toledo and Primate of Spain in 1720.

While leading the Diocese of Barcelona, De Astorga noticed a statue on an archway in Manresa that reminded him to that of Our Lady of Europe in Gibraltar. The statue had no name, so the Bishop titled her as Our Lady of Europe and therefore the archway become El Portal de Europa (English: Europa Archway). Unfortunately, the archway was demolished and the statue taken to another church, being known from that point on as Our Lady of the Snow.

De Astorga was later elevated to the See of Toledo, to which Spain's capital, Madrid, belonged to at the time. There, the Archbishop ordered the carving of a new statue of Our Lady of Europe and paraded it through the streets of Madrid. The last records of the statue locate it in the Convent of St. Teresa of Jesus (Discalced Carmelites). Another seated statue of Our Lady of Europe stands in the Royal Convent of La Encarnación, also in Madrid. Although it is currently dedicated to Our Lady of the Kings, Europe was its original advocation.

=== In Spain ===
There are several Catholic parishes in Spain named Nuestra Señora de Europa. There is one in Madrid and another in Chiclana, Cádiz. La Línea de la Concepción also has a college which belongs to the Diocese of Cádiz y Ceuta and is attached to the University of Cádiz, named Escuela Universitaria de Magisterio 'Virgen de Europa' (English: University College 'Our Lady of Europe').

=== In Italy ===
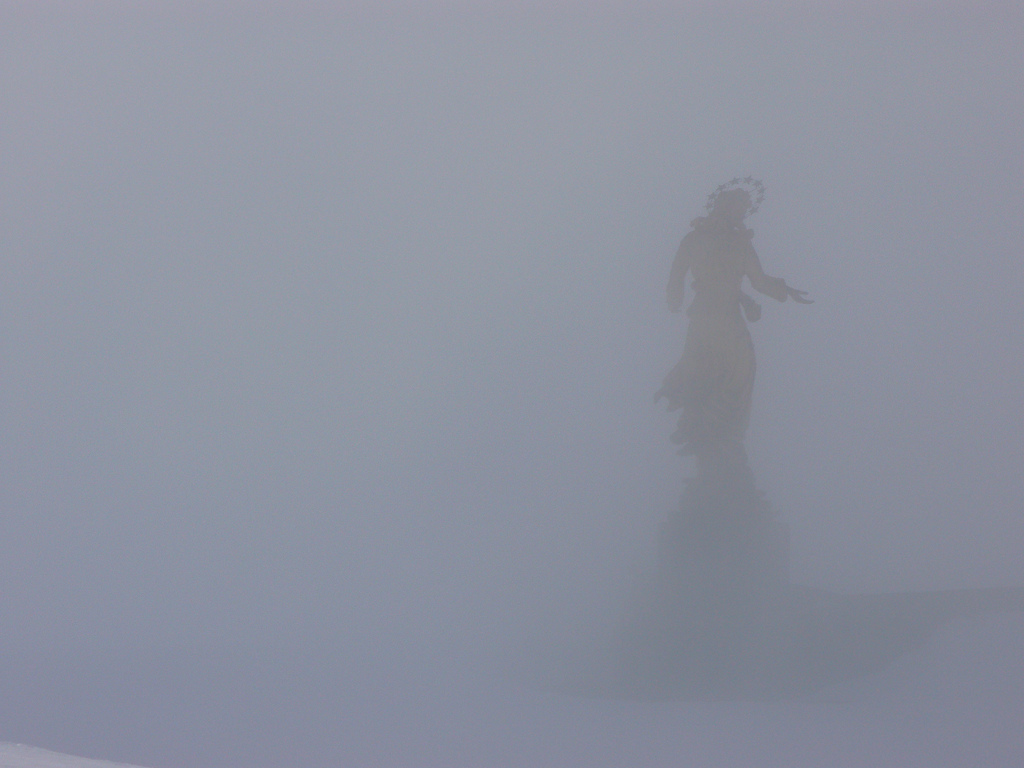
Statue of the Madonna d'Europa in fog.

During the late 1950s, Catholic sectors felt that the Europeist movements would need a Catholic dimension and thought of placing Europe under protection of Our Lady. However, they were unaware that such a devotion was already in existence, albeit at a local level. The movement, supported by the Archbishop of Milan, decided to place a statue in the Italian Dolomites, in the hydrological centre of Europe, since it was the watershed separating the basins of the Rhine, the Danube and the Po.

A 13 metres (43 ft) high statue in honour of Our Lady of Europe (Italian: Madonna d'Europa) was erected at 2,000 metres (6,600 ft) above sea level in the frazione of Motta in the region of Valchiavenna, Italy. It is a gilt bronze statue, which was sculptured by Egidio Casagrande taking inspiration from the Shroud of Turin. The statue rests on a circular structure atop a shrine with an altar below. The structure weighs 4 tonnes (8,800 lb). The monument was blessed by the Archbishop of Milan Giovanni Montini (later Pope Paul VI) on 14 September 1958.

The Shrine of Our Lady of Europe (Italian: Santuario di Nostra Signora d'Europa) is currently the headquarters of the European Ecumenical Centre for Peace.

=== Elsewhere in Europe ===
The Catholic chapel of the International Zaventem Airport in Brussels is dedicated to Our Lady of Europe. Also, in early 2010, it was announced that the Catholic Bishop of Iceland had consecrated a church to Our Lady of Europe.

== See also ==
- Titles of Mary
- Shrine of Our Lady of Africa
