= Gibraltar-Vatican Joint Issue =

- Country of production: Gibraltar and Vatican City
- Date of production: February 10, 2009 (Issue Date)
- Designer: Stephen Perera
- Printer: BDT International, Ireland
- Dimensions: 30 mm × 40 mm (1.2 in × 1.6 in)
- Commemorates: Septcentenary of Devotion to Our Lady of Europe
- Depicts: Statue of the Virgin and Child at the Shrine of Our Lady of Europe at Europa Point, Gibraltar
- Notability: First Joint issue of Gibraltar and Vatican City

The Gibraltar-Vatican Joint Issue is a postage stamp that was released by Vatican City and the British Overseas Territory of Gibraltar in 2009. It commemorated the septcentenary of the devotion to Our Lady of Europe. The image on the stamp was a photograph of the statue of the Virgin and Child found in the Shrine of Our Lady of Europe at Europa Point in Gibraltar. The stamp was the first joint issue between Gibraltar and the Vatican.

While joint issues between the Vatican and other authorities were uncommon for most of the 20th century, there was a substantial increase in such joint issues in the early 21st century. Gibraltar's history of joint issues with authorities other than the Vatican is remarkable for one that was unsuccessful. A joint issue with Israel was cancelled at the last minute in 2011 when the British Government found the planned image of the David Citadel in Jerusalem to be too controversial.

== History ==
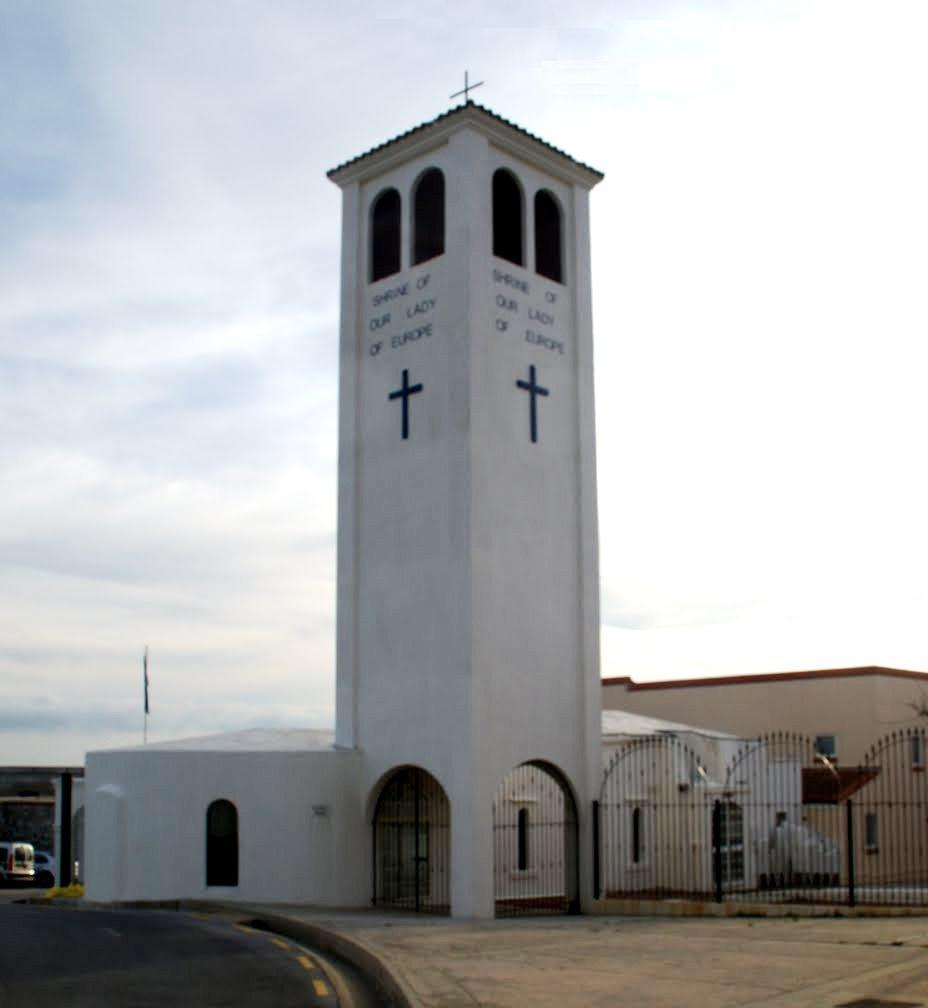
Shrine of Our Lady of Europe at Europa Point

In 2009, the Vatican and the British Overseas Territory of Gibraltar released a joint issue of stamps to commemorate the 700th anniversary of Gibraltar's devotion to Our Lady of Europe. The stamps, which featured an image of the hand-carved statue of the Virgin and Child in the shrine at Europa Point, were the design of photographer Stephen Perera. It represented the first time that Gibraltar participated in a stamp joint issue with the Vatican. The sheetlet for the Gibraltar stamp had a background image of St. Peter's Basilica and Square, while the sheet for the Vatican stamp featured the Rock of Gibraltar. The Gibraltar Philatelic Bureau also released a limited edition folder, containing both the Vatican and Gibraltar stamps. The set consisted of two sheetlets, each with four stamps, measuring 30 x 40 mm. The limited edition folder also included information on Our Lady of Europe, as well as images of the statue and shrine.

Pope John Paul II sanctioned Our Lady of Europe as the official Patroness of Gibraltar in 1979. The process of releasing the joint issue thirty years later involved Bishop Charles Caruana and Father Charles Azzopardi consulting with the Gibraltar Philatelic Bureau to determine how best to celebrate the septcentenary. Meetings were also scheduled at various stamp exhibitions and, finally, the Vatican Philatelic Bureau. The photographer Perera had the distinction of being the first Gibraltarian to design a stamp that was released by another country. The joint issue and its design were approved by various parties, including Queen Elizabeth II, the Government of Gibraltar, Pope Benedict XVI, and Bishop Caruana, the Bishop of Gibraltar. In Gibraltar, the official release of the stamp occurred on 10 February 2009 at the Shrine of Our Lady of Europe at Europa Point, the southernmost portion of the country.

== Other joint issues ==
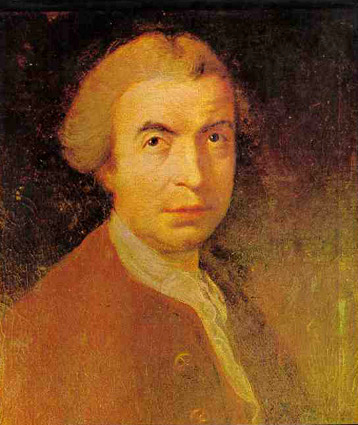
Rugerius Boscovich (1711-1787)

The Vatican City State issued its first stamps in 1929, the same year that it was established under the Lateran Treaties. It released its first joint issue in 1969. Joint issues of stamps by the Vatican and other countries were uncommon for most of the twentieth century. In 2000, the Vatican and Poland released a joint issue designed by Czeslaw Slania which commemorated the eightieth birthday of John Paul II. However, the early twenty-first century saw a substantial increase in joint issues. In 2003, a set released by the Vatican and Poland celebrated the twenty-fifth anniversary of John Paul II's pontificate. The following year, a joint issue of the same countries commemorated the pope's return visits to Poland. In 2005, five of the eleven stamp sets released by the Vatican were joint issues. There have also been joint issues with Germany since Benedict XVI became Pope. In 2011, the Vatican and Croatia released a joint issue which commemorated the tercentenary of the birth of Rugerius Boscovich (1711 – 1787).

Gibraltar issued its first postage stamps in 1886. It has released joint issues with authorities other than the Vatican, including Malta and San Marino in 2010. However, the January 2012 issue of the Hebrew philatelic journal Shovel disclosed that a joint release of a stamp for Gibraltar and Israel was cancelled when the British Government raised last-minute objections to the depiction of the David Citadel in Jerusalem. When Britain insisted that the image be replaced with one of Tel Aviv, after the stamps were already printed and set to be released in June 2011, the Israel Philatelic Service withdrew from the project. The design had been approved by authorities in Gibraltar, and had featured the David Citadel and the Rock of Gibraltar, with the sentence: "Our friendship unites the west with the east of the Mediterranean." The reason given for the insistence on the part of Britain that the image be altered was that Jerusalem was "politically controversial." When Britain requested a Tel Aviv image not only on the stamps issued by Gibraltar, but also the ones issued by Israel, the project was cancelled. Gibraltar reimbursed Israel for the expenses related to printing of the stamps, and acknowledged that British approval should have been sought earlier in the process.
