= Plaza Alta =

Plaza Alta may refer to:

- Plaza Alta (Algeciras), Andalucía, Spain
- Plaza Alta (Badajoz), Extremadura, Spain
- Alta Plaza, San Francisco
