= John Baptist Scandella =

Gibraltarian Roman Catholic priest of Genoese descent

Monsignor John Baptist Scandella
- Roman Catholic Vicar Apostolic of Gibraltar
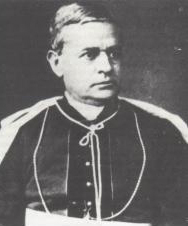
- John Baptist Scandella as Vicar Apostolic of Gibraltar
- Diocese: Roman Catholic Diocese of Gibraltar
- Installed: 28 April 1857
- Term ended: 27 August 1880
- Predecessor: Henry Hughes
- Successor: Gonzalo Canilla

Orders
- Ordination: 25 March 1845
- Consecration: 30 November 1857

Personal details
- Born: 10 September 1821 Gibraltar
- Died: 27 August 1880 (aged 58) Gibraltar
- Denomination: Roman Catholic
- Residence: Gibraltar

John Baptist Scandella STD (Gibraltar, 19 September 1821 - id., 27 August 1880) was a Gibraltarian Roman Catholic priest of Genoese descent. He was Vicar Apostolic of the Diocese of Gibraltar between 1857 and 1880. He spoke fluent English and his native Spanish. Scandella is mainly remembered in Gibraltar for seeing the return of the statue of Our Lady of Europe to Gibraltar from Algeciras in Spain and for his efforts to improve education in the territory.

== Early life ==
He was born to a Gibraltarian family of Genoese descent. As a child, he was a pupil of the Christian Brothers during their first stay in Gibraltar (1835-1837) and since he was very young he felt the call of the vocation to priesthood. He was a gifted student who later obtained a Doctorate of Sacred Theology with the mark of magna cum laude.

== Career ==
He was ordained priest on 25 March 1845 and was seconded to Corfu (then under British rule) as Vicar General to Bishop Nicholson. He remained there for ten years, returning to Gibraltar in 1855 to be appointed secretary to Vicar Apostolic Henry Hughes. Hughes resigned in 1856 and on 28 April 1857, Scandella was appointed new Vicar Apostolic of Gibraltar. He was also appointed Titular Bishop of Antinoë (since 1840, all Vicars Apostolic of Gibraltar were also appointed Titular Bishops). Scandella was the first Gibraltarian to be appointed to such dignity which was welcomed by Gibraltarian society. According to Charles Caruana, current bishop of Gibraltar:

"The people of Gibraltar was overjoyed at having an indigenous Bishop; Rome seemed to be saying that the Colony was mature enough to have one of its own to govern spiritually."

=== Return of the statue of Our Lady of Europe ===
At the time of the Capture of Gibraltar by the Anglo-Dutch fleet, the Shrine of Our Lady of Europe was plundered and desecrated. The statue of the Virgin and Child was broken and its remains thrown out to sea. The pieces had been recovered by a fisherman and later delivered to Juan Romero de Figueroa, the priest in charge at the Church of St. Mary the Crowned and St. Bernard. Romero de Figueroa eventually took the pieces of the statue to Algeciras for safekeeping in a chapel that took the name of Our Lady: the Chapel of Our Lady of Europe. During the early 1860s Scandella petitioned for the return of the original statue from Algeciras. After long discussions, it was agreed that the original statue was to return to Gibraltar so long as an exact replica would be carved and placed in the Chapel of Our Lady of Europe in Algeciras. The original statue eventually returned to Gibraltar in 1864. As the original Shrine of Our Lady of Europe remained in military hands, a new location for the statue had to be found, provided that, at Scandella's wishes, the new shrine were as near to Europa Point as possible. After a popular fundraising campaign, a site was acquired along Engineer Road, and a new chapel was built, where Our Lady of Europe was enthroned in May 1866.

Scandella attended the First Vatican Council (1869-1870) as Council Father. During his stay in Rome, he succeeded in bringing the Shrine of Our Lady of Europe to the attention of Pope Pius IX. The Pope later donated a marble altar to Our Lady of Europe in Gibraltar. Its front piece depicted the coat of arms of Pope Pius IX and that of Bishop Scandella, together with a monogram of Our Lady of Europe.

=== Improving education ===
His other concern was education, where he continued the efforts of his predecessor, Vicar Apostolic Hughes. Scandella promoted the institution of new schools, both primary and secondary, for boys and girls, charging the wealthy parents to support the education of poorer children. He first opened a school at Rosia Parade. When the Society of Saint Vincent de Paul established itself in Gibraltar in 1860, Scandella asked them to promote children's education, so the society eventually opened two additional schools, one in Catalan Bay and another at Lime Kiln Road. Two more were erected in the crypt of St. Joseph's Parish Church when it was completed in 1865. He was also the main person responsible for bringing the Christian Brothers back to Gibraltar and for the establishment of the Loreto Nuns in Gibraltar. After a five-year battle, he managed to obtain a 50% increase in the Colonial Office grant for all the schools in the territory.

The fame of the schools promoted by Scandella spread widely:

The Catholic Bishop pays for schools for the poor, and he presided over a magnificent college founded by him for young men and another one for girls. The children of the leading families of the place and even of the cities of Andalusia are eductated there with splendid results. None are better for the study of living languages, for English, French, Spanish, Arabic, etc. is spoken in Gibraltar.

Thanks to his efforts by the 1870s, the Roman Catholic Church took a position of pre-eminence in the Gibraltarian education that lasted until the twentieth century.

=== Civil society ===
Scandella was a prominent figure within Gibraltar's civil society, and had several clashes with the Governor or the colonial administration. In 1876, he rejected the imposition of a tobacco tax in order to avoid tobacco smuggling into Spain. He argued that if the British Government wished to impose such a tax, alternative employment had to be provided. He even traveled to London in order to lobby the Members of Parliament for the order to be withdrawn. Scandella tried to enlist the wealthiest classes of Gibraltar join his cause, however, the members of the Exchange and Commercial Library refused. This created a serious antagonism against Scandella, which worsened upon his death and the election of the new bishop, Scandella's secretary, Gonzalo Canilla.

Scandella has vigorously rejected the alien orders in council that prevented Spanish boys from attending his schools or refused to allow residence in Gibraltar to the children of native mothers and alien fathers (as it could incite illicit unions and the birth of illegitimate children). On the contrary, he rejected the presence of Maltese immigrants on the grounds that they were mostly criminals, an opinion shared with the majority of the Gibraltarian society at the time.
