= Shrine of Our Lady of Europe (Italy) =

Catholic shrine in Lombardy, Italy

- Santuario di Nostra Signora d'Europa
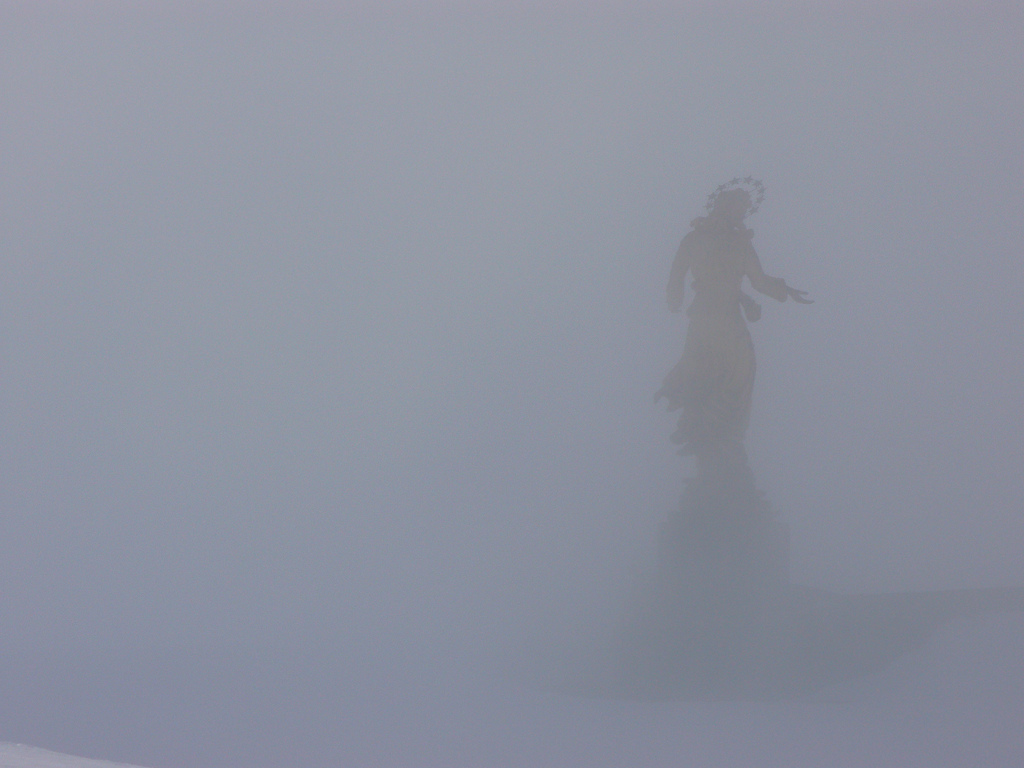
- Statue of the Madonna d'Europa in fog

Religion
- Affiliation: Roman Catholic Church
- Deity: Our Lady of Europe
- Rite: Roman Rite

Location
- Location: Campodolcino, Lombardy, Italy
- Interactive map of Shrine of Our Lady of Europe
- Coordinates: 46.4177768°N 9.3623668°E

Architecture
- Type: Shrine
- Completed: 1958

Specifications
- Materials: Gilt bronze
- Elevation: 1,925 m (6,316 ft)

The Shrine of Our Lady of Europe (Italian: Santuario di Nostra Signora d'Europa; Lombard: Santüari se la Madòna d'Europa) is a Roman Catholic shrine at Campodolcino, Lombardy, Italy. It is devoted to Our Lady of Europe (Italian: Madonna d'Europa; Lombard: Madòna d'Europa) and is currently the headquarters of the European Ecumenical Centre for Peace.

== History ==
During the late 1950s, Catholic sectors felt that the Europeist movements would need a Catholic dimension and thought of placing Europe under the protection of the Blessed Virgin Mary. However, they were unaware that such a devotion was already in existence, albeit at a local level, in the British territory of Gibraltar (where the original Shrine devoted to Our Lady still exists to this day) and to a lesser extent in some neighbouring locations in Spain. The movement, supported by the Archbishop of Milan, decided to place a statue in the region of the Italian Alps, which marks the hydrological centre of Europe, since it was the watershed separating the basins of the rivers Rhine, Danube and Po.

The monument was blessed by the Archbishop of Milan Giovanni Montini (later Pope Paul VI) on 14 September 1958.

== Statue ==
A 13 metres (43 ft) high statue in honour of Our Lady of Europe (also known as "Our Lady, Protector of Europe") was erected in 1957 at 1,925 metres (6,316 ft) above sea level on Mt. Serenissima, above Motta, a frazione of the comune of Campodolcino on the western slopes of the Valle Spluga to the north of Chiavenna. It is a gilt bronze statue, which was sculpted by Egidio Casagrande of Borgo Valsugana, taking inspiration from the Shroud of Turin. The statue rests on a circular structure atop a sanctuary with an altar below. The structure weighs 4 tonnes (8,800 lb).

The memorial was sponsored by priest Don Luigi Re, who raised $48,000 for the project after being caught in a mountain storm near the site and conceiving the idea of erecting a shrine along Europe's continental divide. Casagrande, whose primary business was manufacturing copper vases, spent five years creating the statue. The monument was blessed by the Archbishop of Milan Giovanni Montini (later Pope Paul VI) on 14 September 1958.
