= Church of Nuestra Señora de la Palma, Algeciras =

Church of Our Lady of the Palm Iglesia de Nuestra Señora de la Palma
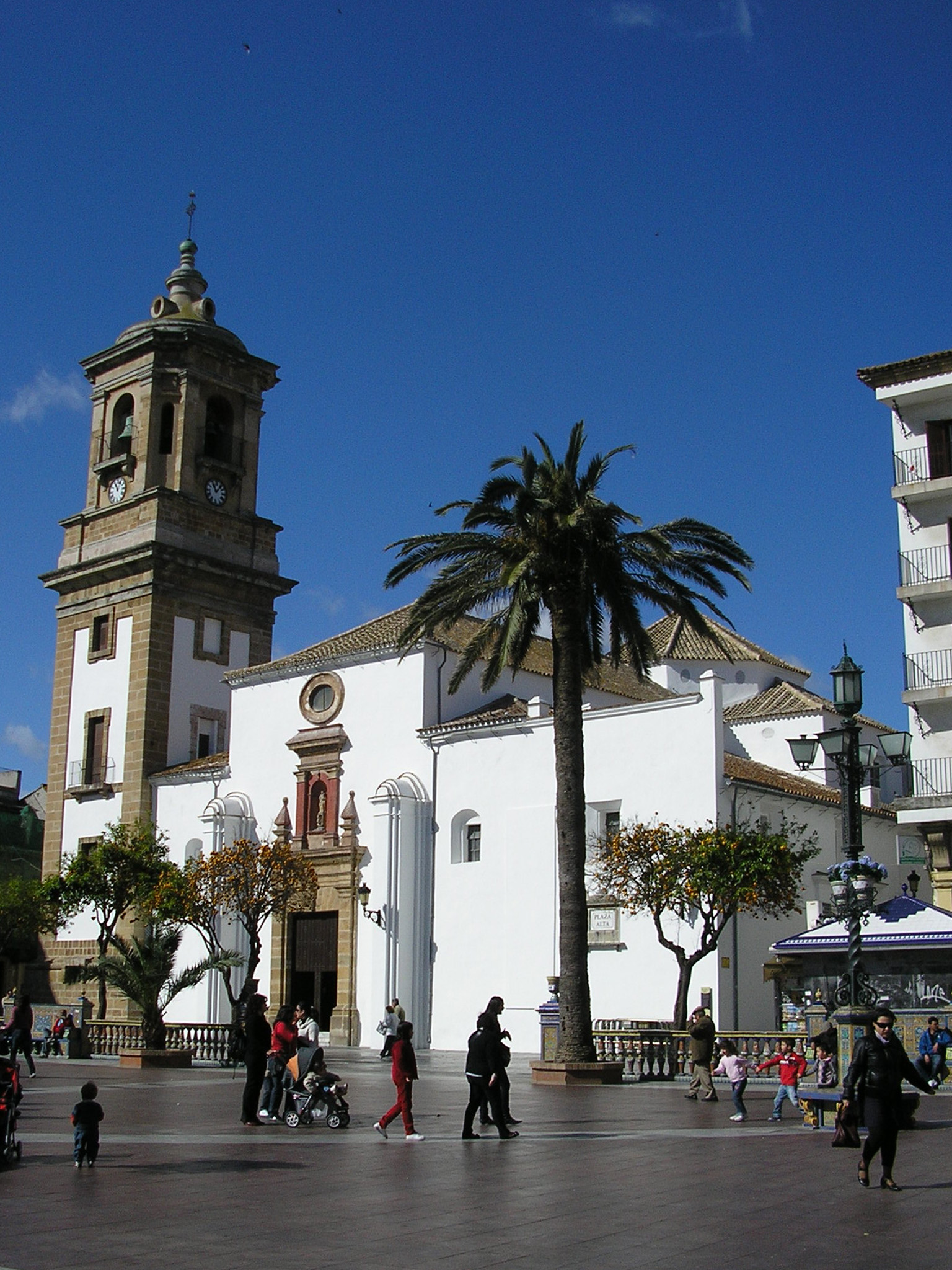
- Iglesia de Nuestra Señora de la Palma on the Plaza Alta
- Church of Our Lady of the Palm; Iglesia de Nuestra Señora de la Palma
- 36°7′51.22″N 5°26′51.84″W
- Location: Algeciras
- Country: Spain
- Denomination: Roman Catholic
- Website: Official website

History
- Status: Parish church
- Consecrated: 6 June 1738

Architecture
- Functional status: Active
- Heritage designation: Bien de Interés Cultural
- Designated: 4 July 1992
- Architect(s): Alonso Barranco, Isidro Casaus
- Groundbreaking: 1723
- Completed: 1738

Administration
- Archdiocese: Archdiocese of Seville
- Diocese: Cádiz y Ceuta

Clergy
- Priest: Jesús Casado Benito

The Church of Our Lady of the Palm (Spanish: Iglesia de Nuestra Señora de la Palma; alternates Virgen de la Palma and Virgen María, Mistica Palma) is a Roman Catholic church on the southwestern corner of the Plaza Alta in Algeciras, Spain. Listed as Bien de Interes Cultural by the Spanish Ministry of Culture in 1992, like the Spanish: Plaza Alta itself, it is an important city landmark.

== History ==
The church is consecrated to Santa María de la Palma (Mary the Virgin of Palm Sunday) since Palm Sunday 1344 when Alfonso XI of Castile conquered the city after the Siege of Algeciras (1342-1344). That year, Pope Clement VI created the Diocese of Algeciras which was linked to that of Cádiz after he had converted the grand mosque of Algeciras, in accordance with Christian rites, into a church. That city was, however, retaken by the Moors in 1368 and destroyed on the orders of Muhammed V of Granada. The Diocese of Algeciras disappeared with it. The church is the canonical seat of the Cofradía de Jesús Nazareno, Santo Cristo de la Fe, Santa Cruz de Jerusalén y María Santísima de la Amargura (Brotherhood of Jesus of Nazareth, Holy Christ of the Faith, Holy Cross of Jerusalem and Mary of Sorrows). At the occasion of the bicentenary of the church, Santa María de la Palma was made co-patron saint of Algeciras, with Saint Bernard of Clairvaux, in 1923 by Pope Pius XI.

Work began on the current building in 1723 when, as a result of population growth, the nearby Chapel of Our Lady of Europe no longer provided sufficient space for the congregation. It was started by Alonso Barranco and completed by Isidro Casaus. According to Pascual Madoz in his Gazetteer of 1843, "the church was completed in 1738 with alms from the faithful and other resources, allowing Bishop Lorenzo Armengual de la Mota on June 6 of that year, to give it the status of parish church which until then had been enjoyed by the primitive chapel of the Cortijo de Gálvez." In 1736, the Iglesia de La Palma, which was still under construction, assumed the paroquial responsibilities. The Plaza Alta, constructed in 1807, includes the Iglesia de Nuestra Señora de la Palma, as well as the Chapel of Our Lady of Europe, palm trees, and a fountain.

== Architecture and fittings ==
It originally consisted of a nave and two aisles but two smaller aisles were added under the gable roof in 1795. The tower, 150 feet (46 m) high, was built between 1793 and 1804. Stones from the old town walls were used as the building material. The blocks, which can be seen in the tower, still bear the marks of stonemasons that can be seen elsewhere in the city.

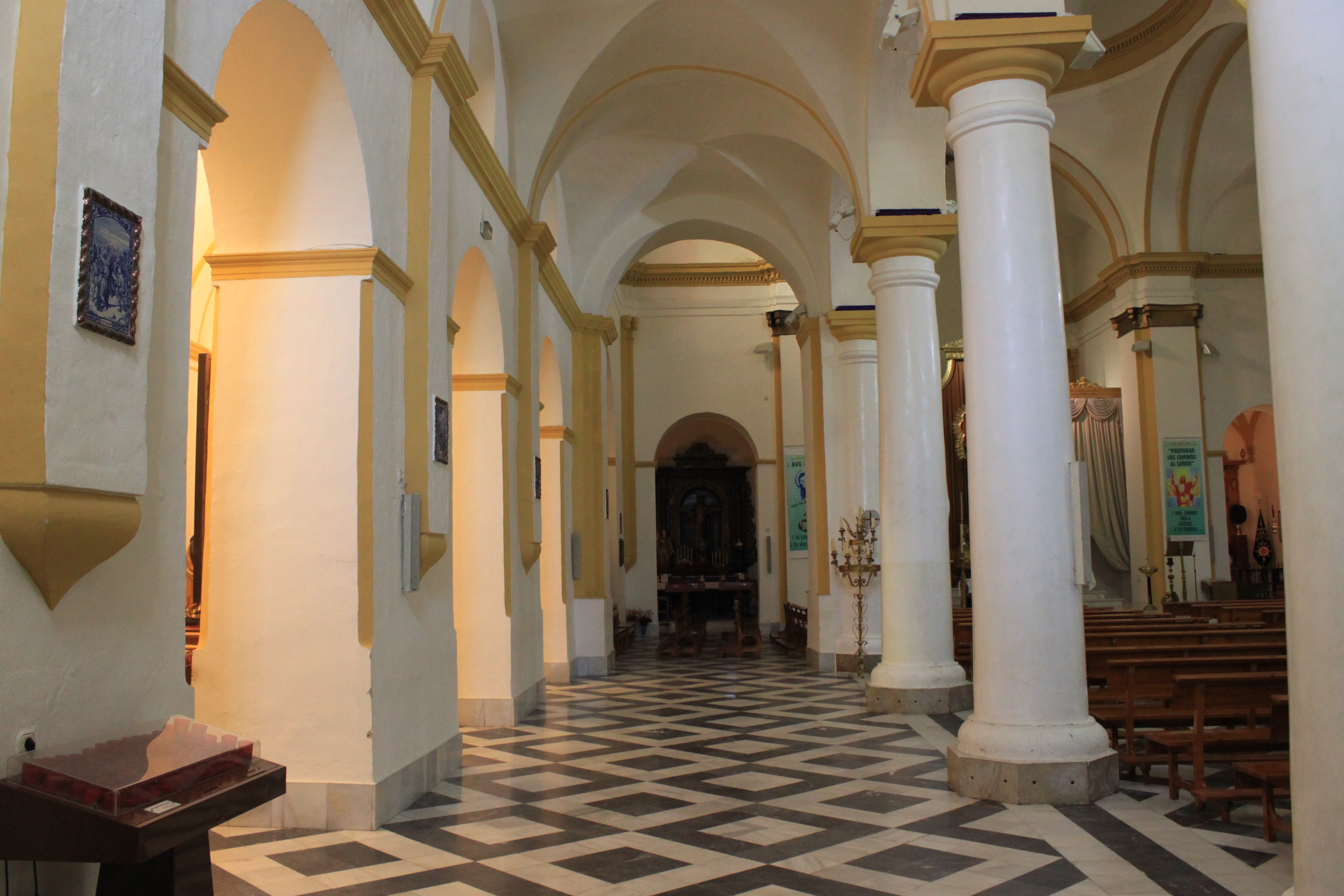
The church nave

The nave has a barrel vault, separated from the sides by thick Doric columns, while vaulting of the aisles is supported by pilasters. The main features of the facade are buttresses on either side of the door and a niche for the Virgin Mary. The rear of the building was cleared at the beginning of 21st century but there a modern building remains on the left, obliterating the view over the Calle Ventura Morón. Inside there is an 18th-century Italian alabaster sculpture which, according to legend, was taken from a boat that was prevented from leaving the port by bad weather. It was badly damaged during the anti-religious incidents of May 1931 but was later restored. Other features of the church were not so fortunate: the high altar and the monstrance were lost. Due to restoration work, the interior has been completely cleaned up but there are hardly any decorations or pictures.
