= Juan Romero de Figueroa =

Spanish priest (1646–1720)

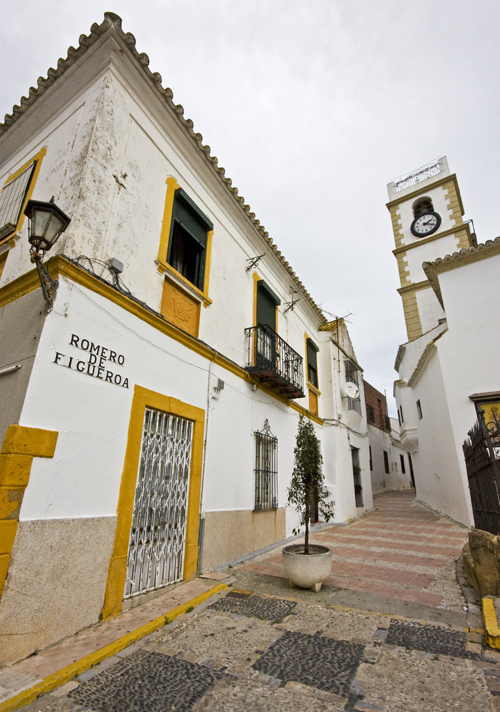
A street next to the Church of St. Mary the Crowned (Spanish: Iglesia de Santa María la Coronada) in San Roque named after Romero de Figueroa.

Juan Romero de Figueroa (Gibraltar, 16 September 1646 – 7 July 1720) was a Spanish Roman Catholic priest, in charge of the Parish Church of St. Mary the Crowned (Santa Maria la Coronada y San Bernardo) during the last years of Gibraltar's Spanish period and first ones of the British period, until his death. He remained at his post even after the territory's capture by an Anglo-Dutch fleet in 1704 on behalf of the Archduke Charles, one of the claimants to the Spanish throne in the War of the Spanish Succession, when most of its population abandoned Gibraltar (only about 60 out of 4,000 remained).

== Capture of Gibraltar ==
Juan Romero de Figueroa was born in Gibraltar and baptized on 16 September 1646 in the Church of St. Mary the Crowned. His parents were Álvaro Martín and Leonor Vázquez. He took the minor orders in 1661, and was appointed deputy chancellor of the Seminary of Cádiz in 1674. Since 1682 he had its parish in Gibraltar, and was the priest of the Parish Church of St. Mary the Crowned on 4 August 1704 when the city capitulated to the besieging Anglo-Dutch forces. Along with his curate and the bell ringer he successfully protected his church from the soldiers who ran amok after the surrender, other churches in the territory were desecrated.

The Terms of Surrender of Gibraltar and the definite phrasing of the Treaty of Utrecht allowed for the practice of the Catholic Faith, so Romero de Figueroa went on as the priest of the Catholic population of the town until his demise, in 1720. In order to facilitate and stabilise ecclesiastical governance, the Bishop of Cádiz y Ceuta, who had jurisdiction over the church in Gibraltar, made him the first Vicar General of Gibraltar. The altar of the Blessed Sacrament in the Cathedral of St. Mary the Crowned keeps a marble tablet with the initials of Juan Romero de Figueroa. His mortal remains lay buried in there.

Romero de Figueroa was an eye-witness to the capture of Gibraltar. His accounts of the incident and the first years of Habsburg and British dominion over the town are notable, as some of the very few primary sources available. Two main works were produced by him: the annotations in the Gibraltar baptismal records which are currently kept in the Church of St. Mary the Crowned (Spanish: Iglesia de Santa María la Coronada) in San Roque (a municipality in Gibraltar's township where most of the villagers settled down after the 1704 Anglo-Dutch siege), and a manuscript portraying the events he beheld, which went missing in the midst of the Peninsular War. However, the manuscript was verbatim quoted at length by Ignacio López de Ayala, author of Historia de Gibraltar (Madrid, 1782).

As soon as the Franco-Spanish siege of 1704–1705 had been lifted, Romero de Figueroa began secretly to send documents, religious jewellery and plate, pictures, and ornaments to the settlements established in the Campo de Gibraltar. He was also responsible for the safekeeping and rescue of the statue of Our Lady of Europe from the shrine of the same name. Soon after the capture of Gibraltar in 1704, the shrine was sacked and stripped of all its valuables by soldiers running amok, disobeying the orders of their officers. The statue of Our Lady was mutilated and flung onto the rocks below, where it was found by a fisherman. He took the remains to Romero de Figueroa, who sent them to the neighbouring Algeciras, where the statue was repaired and given a new home in a small chapel then dedicated to Saint Bernard of Clairvaux, which was later rededicated as the Chapel of Our Lady of Europe. In 1864 the statue was returned to Gibraltar, at the request of John Baptist Scandella, Vicar Apostolic of Gibraltar.
