= Henry Hughes (Vicar Apostolic of Gibraltar) =

Styles of Henry Hughes, O.F.M.
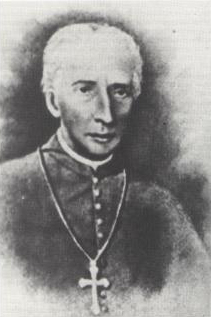
- Reference style: The Right Reverend
- Spoken style: My Lord
- Religious style: Bishop

Henry Hughes, O.F.M. (1788–1860) was an Irish-born Roman Catholic bishop and Franciscan friar who served as the Vicar Apostolic of Gibraltar from 1839 to 1856.

Born in Wexford, Ireland on 26 June 1788, he was appointed the Vicar Apostolic of Gibraltar and Titular Bishop of Heliopolis in Augustamnica by Pope Gregory XVI on 15 March 1839. His consecration to the Episcopate took place on 21 March 1841; the principal consecrator was Giacomo Filippo Fransoni, Cardinal-Priest of Santa Maria in Ara Coeli, with Ignazio Giovanni Cadolini, Titular Archbishop of Edessa in Osrhoëne, serving as co-consecrator.

Bishop Hughes resigned in 1856 and died on 12 October 1860, aged 72.

Catholic Church titles
Preceded by John Baptist Nosardy Zino	Vicar Apostolic of Gibraltar; 1839–1856	Succeeded by John Baptist Scandella
