= John Baptist Nosardy Zino =

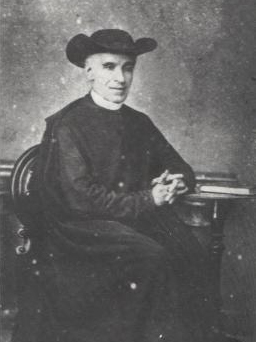
John Baptist Nosardy Zino

John Baptist Nosardy Zino was a 19th-century Roman Catholic priest.

He was appointed the Vicar Apostolic of Gibraltar by Pope Pius VII on 25 January 1816. After holding the post for twenty-three years, he resigned the position in 1839.

Catholic Church titles
| New title | Vicar Apostolic of Gibraltar; 1816–1839 | Succeeded by Henry Hughes |
