= Plaza Alta (Algeciras) =

Square in the old town of Algeciras, Spain

Coordinates: 36°7′52″N 5°26′50″W

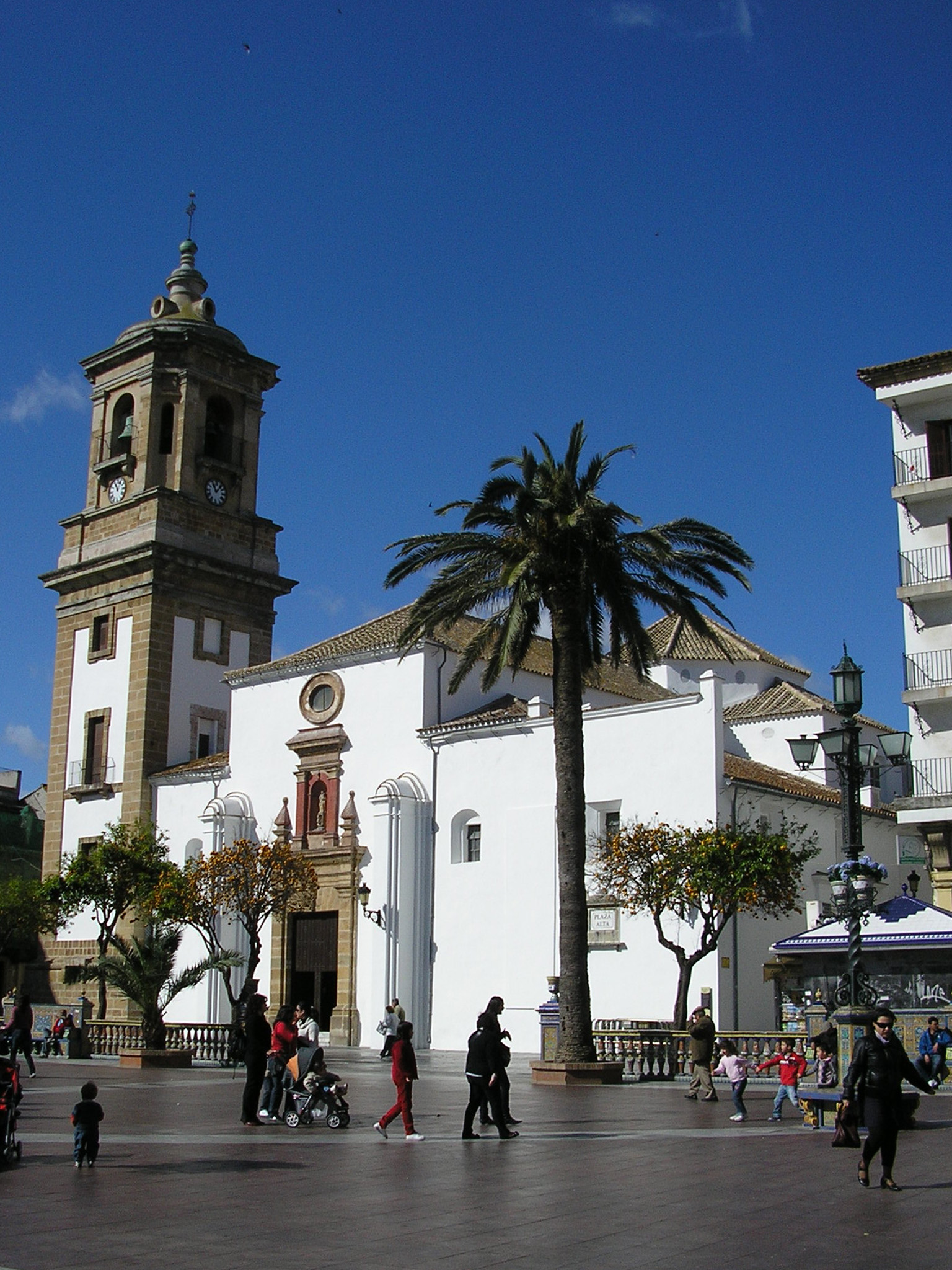
Iglesia de Nuestra Señora de la Palma on the Plaza Alta

Plaza Alta is a square in the old town of Algeciras, Spain. It is one of the major centres of activity in the city, hosting numerous events and festivals throughout the year. Some of the city's most important buildings such as the Iglesia de la Palma and the Capilla de Europa stand on the square while neighbouring streets include Calle Ancha and Calle Convento.

== Geography ==
The plaza is bounded by Camino Pablo Mayaho and Camino Ventura Moron. The Iglesia de la Palma is to the west, while the Capilla de Europa is to the southeast.

== Name ==
The square has had various names over time which mirror the history of Spain. Its first name, as today, was Plaza Alta which can be seen on a map dated 1725. After the city's replanning in 1807, Manuel Godoy called it Plaza del Almirante but shortly afterwards it became Plaza del Rey, then in conjunction with the 1821 insurrection, Plaza de la Constitución, returning to its previous name in 1824. From 10 October 1830, to mark Isabel II's ascension to the throne it was changed to Plaza de la Reina. In 1873, with the proclamation of the republic, it again became Plaza de la Constitución, a name it kept until 1931 when it was renamed Plaza de la República and in 1936, after the Civil War, Plaza del Generalísimo Franco. Finally during the transition, it finally returned to its original name, Plaza Alta, which in fact was what everyone had always called it.

== History ==
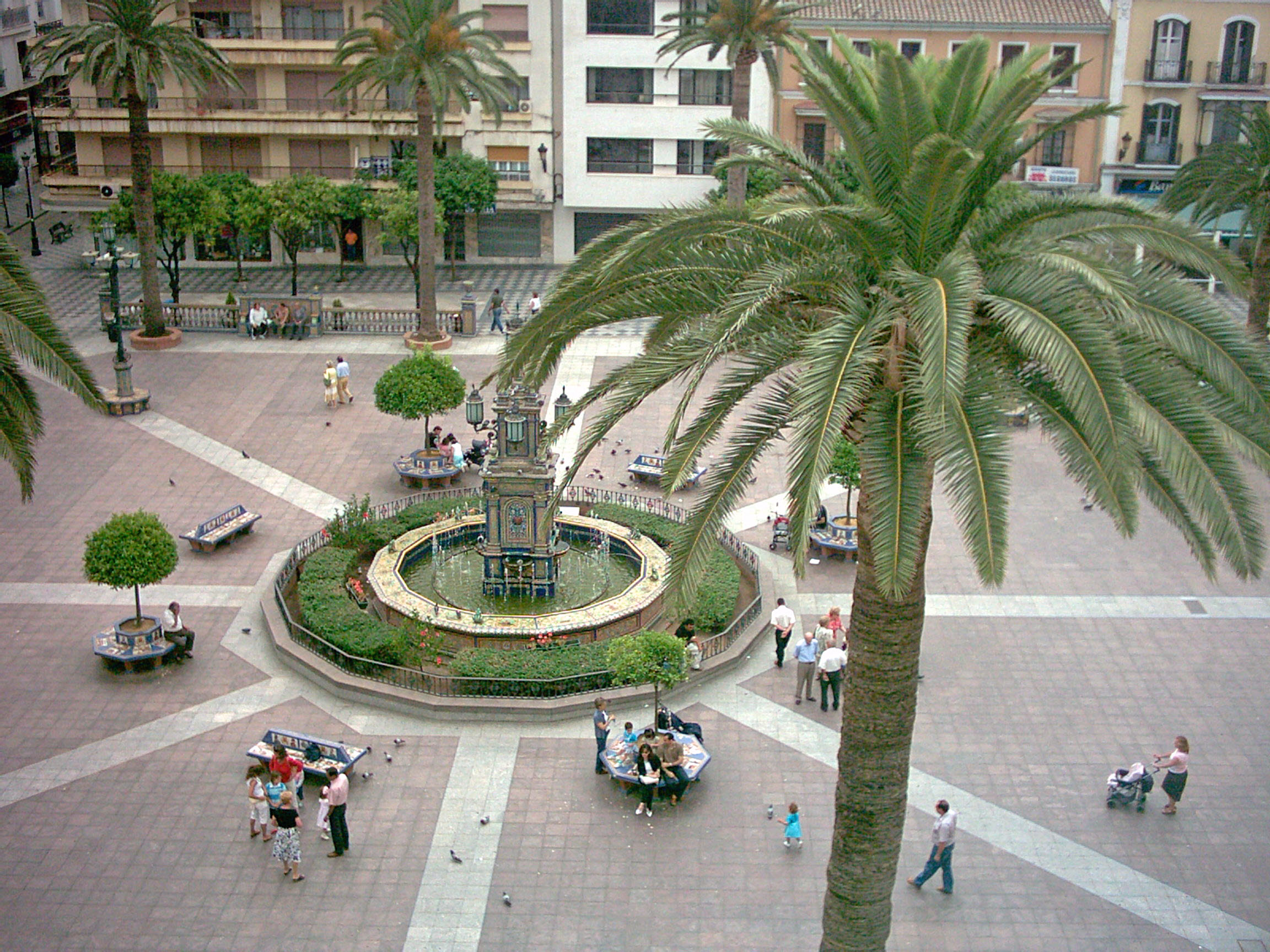
Aerial view

The area the Plaza Alta occupies has existed since the city was remodeled in accordance with plans the Marquis of Verboom produced. There it is designated "Plaza Alta" (high square), in contrast to the market square "Plaza Baja" (low square). Since 1783, it has had a public fountain, Los Arcos, supplied with water from the city's aqueduct. The first systematic replanning of the area was undertaken in 1807 by General Castaños, Governor of the Campo de Gibraltar. In the original plans, the western end of the square was raised to provide a level area and the boundaries with the surrounding streets were marked off with chains attached to stone posts. There were eight entrances: four in the corners and another four on the sides. The square was surrounded by poplars and there were orange trees in tubs. There was to have been an obelisk in the center of the square but it was replaced by a column designed by Joaquin Dolz. A bust of Manuel Godoy was planned for the top but in fact it was never added. The square was redesigned in 1925 by Mayor Joaquin Bianchi when the obelisk was blown up and the area was paved over. A little later, a street lamp was placed at the centre on a red brick structure which the people called la cocina económica (the cheap kitchen) while the pillars, chains and benches were kept until the surrounding streets were widened for traffic in 1929. A year later in 1930, the square was once again remodeled by Mayor Emilio Morillas Salinas, taking on the appearance it has today. The plaza was considered to be a landmark the childhood of Paco de Lucía.

== Architecture and fittings ==
The symmetrical plaza contains a monumental fountain at the centre, circular benches and lamp posts all around, while a balustrade borders the surrounding streets, all decorated with Seville ceramics from the factories Cerámica Santa Ana and Cerámica Triana Casa Gonzále. Little has changed since the 1930 remodel, although a few benches have been added with ceramic decorations inspired by Cervantes' Don Quixote, a few palm trees have been planted and there are potted floral decorations.
