= European Marian Network =

The European Marian Network connects twenty Catholic Marian sanctuaries in Europe (as many as the number of decades in the Rosary). It was established in 2003, promoted by the Holy See.

Only one sanctuary per country (the best known) was chosen. The sanctuaries, and their devotions, are the following:

- Chapel of the Miraculous Image in Altötting, Germany
- Our Lady of Banneux in Banneux, Belgium
- Shrine of Mary Help of Christians in Brezje, Slovenia
- Our Lady of Csíksomlyó in Șumuleu Ciuc, Romania
- Our Lady of Częstochowa in Częstochowa, Poland
- The Black Madonna of the Einsiedeln Abbey in Einsiedeln, Switzerland
- Our Lady of Fátima in Fátima, Portugal
- Shrine of Our Lady of Europe in Gibraltar
- (Republic of Ireland) Our Lady of Knock in Knock, Ireland
- Mariánska hora in Levoča, Slovakia
- Basilica della Santa Casa in Loreto, Italy
- Sanctuary of Our Lady of Lourdes in Lourdes, France
- Our Lady of Máriapócs in Máriapócs, Hungary
- Basilica of the Birth of the Virgin Mary in Mariazell, Austria
- Mary of the Snows in Marija Bistrica, Croatia
- Sanctuary of Our Lady of Mellieħa in Mellieħa, Malta
- Our Lady of the Gate of Dawn in Vilnius, Lithuania
- Our Lady of Walsingham in Walsingham, United Kingdom
- Cathedral-Basilica of Our Lady of the Pillar in Zaragoza, Spain
- Theotokos of Zarvanytsia in Zarvanytsia, Ukraine

The Sanctuary Animators from the members of the Network meet each year to get to know each other better and, above all, to understand better the needs of the millions of pilgrims and visitors who frequent these Sanctuaries. The gathering in 2003 took place in Lourdes, in 2004 it took place in Fátima, in 2005 it took place in Máriapócs, in 2006 in Sanctuary of Our Lady of Knock, in 2007 in Vilnius, in 2008 in Zaragoza and in 2009 in Częstochowa. 2010 took place in Gibraltar, 2011 was in Walsingham, 2012 was in Rome and in 2013, it took place in Mellieħa

== See also ==
- Shrines to the Virgin Mary
- Titles of Mary
