= La Inmaculada Concepción, La Línea de la Concepción =

Iglesia de la Inmaculada Concepción
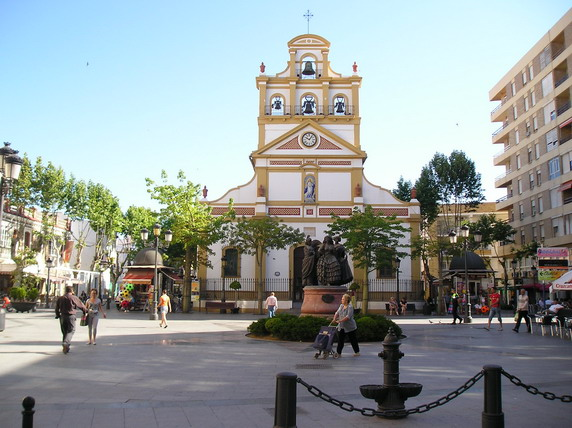
- Plaza de la Iglesia
- Iglesia de la Inmaculada Concepción
- 36°09′44.1″N 5°21′05.2″W
- Location: C / Sol, 39; 11300 La Línea de la Concepción (Cádiz)
- Country: Spain
- Denomination: Roman Catholic
- Website: Web site

Iglesia de la Inmaculada Concepción is a parish church in the town of La Línea de la Concepción, in Andalusia, Spain.

== History ==
When the town was created, one of the first priorities was a church. There was a chapel already available but it would only hold 80 people and it belonged to the military. In 1870, La Línea achieved the official status of a municipality (it had belonged to San Roque up to then). The city council answering to popular demand set up a committee to decide where a new church should be constructed. Progress was slow and by 1879 pragmatic decisions needed to be made to create a working place of worship. December of that year saw the church in use as long as it did not rain. The roof was not waterproof and the priest was left to gather funds to complete the roof and other fixtures and fittings.

== Description ==
The main Parish church was built in the 19th century colonial style. Notable features are the 17th-century reredos and the image of St. Mary made by the San Roque sculptor Luis Ortega Bru. The church became a shrine at the end of 2005. The exterior of the building echoes the interior layout, with a remarkable simplicity and beauty.

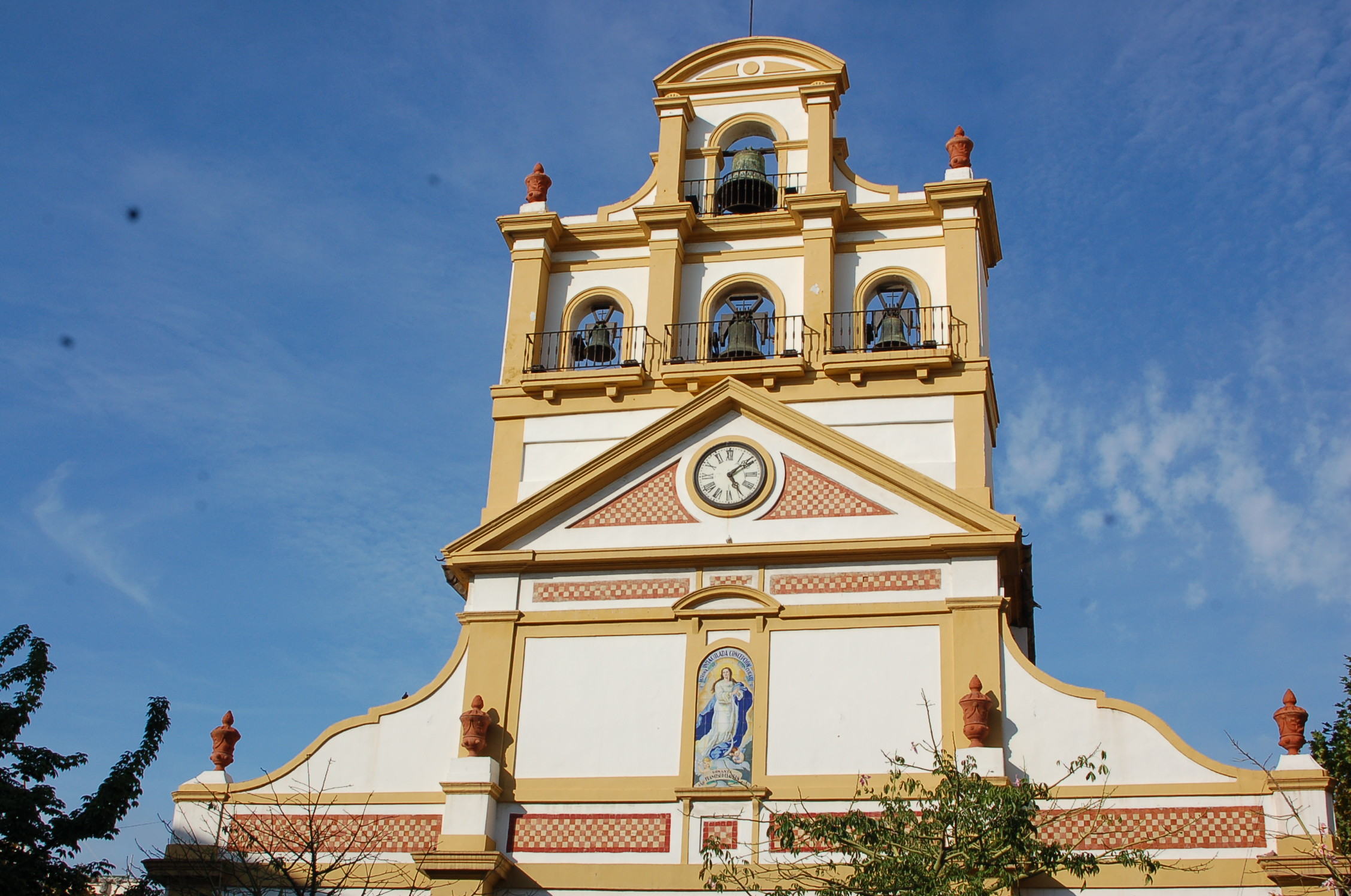
Facade detail

Inside the parish church of the Immaculate Conception there are images of Jesús del Gran Poder, and others belonging to four religious guilds.
