= Egidio Casagrande =

Italian sculptor and metalworker

- Born: Borgo Valsugana, Trentino, Italy
- Occupations: Sculptor, metalworker
- Known for: Our Lady, Protector of Europe statue; Fontana Evita
- Children: Ezio Casagrande, Lucia Casagrande, Franco Casagrande, Josette Casagrande (deceased)

Egidio Casagrande was an Italian sculptor and metalworker from Borgo Valsugana, Trentino, known for his copper and brass work. He is best remembered for creating the monumental statue Our Lady, Protector of Europe (Madonna d'Europa), a 14 metres (46 ft) copper sculpture installed in the Alps in 1957, and the Fontana Evita, a major public fountain that served as Borgo Valsugana's town symbol for over three decades.

== Career ==
=== Casagrande workshop ===
Casagrande operated a metalworking business in Borgo Valsugana, specializing in the hand manufacture of copper vases and decorative items. His workshop, which opened in the late 1930s, produced a wide range of copper and brass work, including plates and panels depicting rural life scenes, religious art, amphorae, vases, planters, clocks, weathervanes, mirrors, jewelry, and crucifixes.

From 1955 to 1960, Casagrande employed 120 workers and shipped products worldwide, and it was one of the major employers in the Valsugana region. Pieces were marked "E. Casagrande Italy Borgo Valsugana" with individual production numbers. The workshop trained apprentices in copper and brassworking. The business continued until 1986, when it closed due to changing market conditions and competition from industrial production.

=== Our Lady, Protector of Europe ===
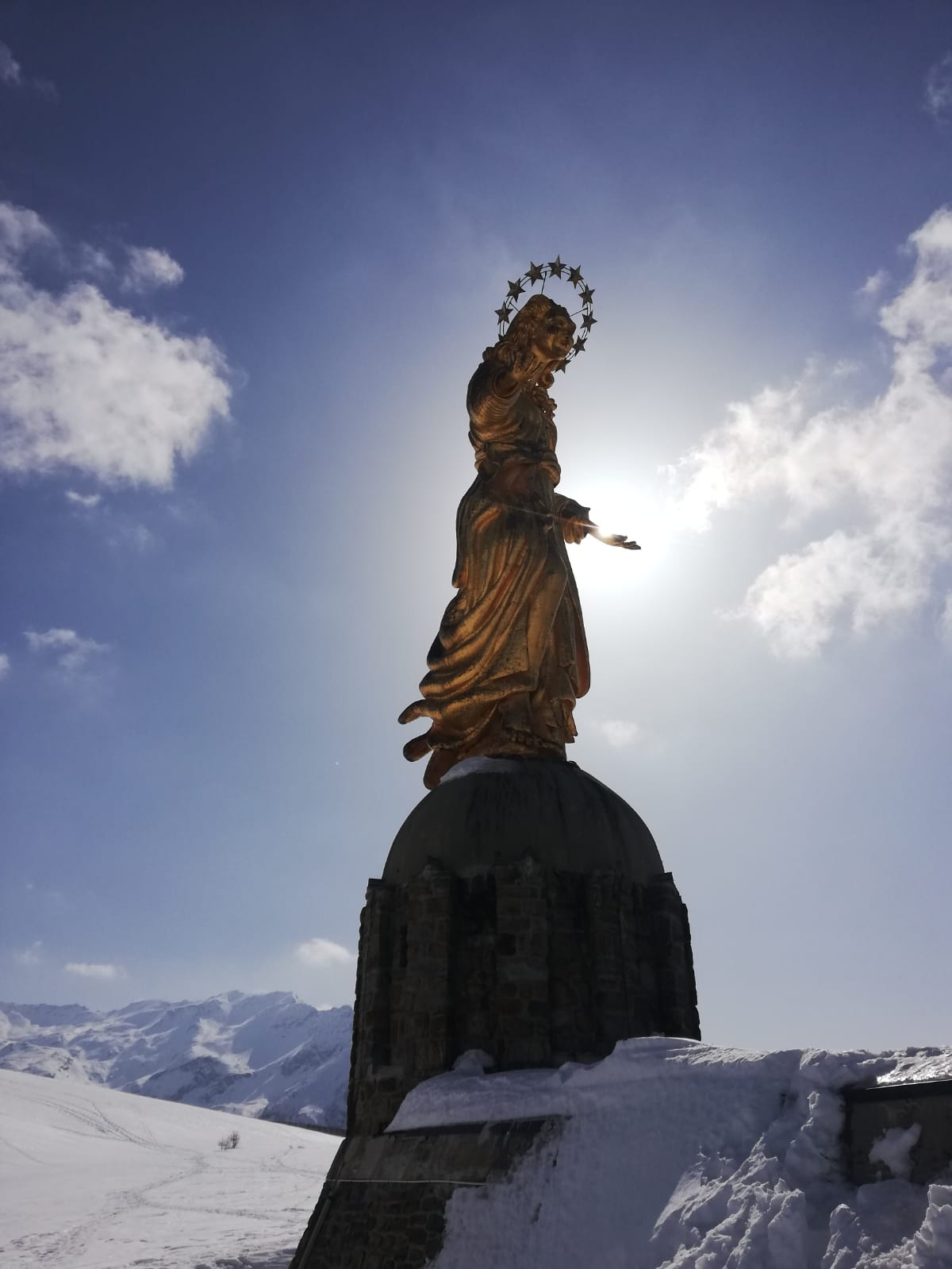
Our Lady, Protector of Europe statue

Casagrande's best-known work, "Our Lady, Protector of Europe" (Vergine delle Vette, transl. "Virgin of the Peaks"), was commissioned by priest Don Luigi Re. Initially intended for Pizzo Stella at an altitude of 2,000 metres (6,600 ft), the statue was ultimately installed at the Shrine of Our Lady of Europe at Motta di Madesimo due to safety concerns about the original location.

The sculpture, made of copper repoussé over a steel framework, stands 14 metres (46 ft) high and weighs 4 tonnes (8,800 lb). Though not formally trained, Casagrande completed the statue in ten months, working from 1955 to 1956. The statue was later covered with gold foil by skilled goldsmiths from Italy and other European countries.

The statue began its journey from Borgo Valsugana in 1956, stopping in Pergine Valsugana and Rovereto before reaching its final destination. The monument was inaugurated on 15 October 1957 and is an outdoor sanctuary at the Shrine of Our Lady of Europe, at 2,000 meters above sea level.

=== Fontana Evita ===
Casagrande designed the Fontana Evita, a monumental copper fountain dedicated to Eva Perón that was completed posthumously by his workshop in the 1970s. The fountain, measuring approximately 10 to 12 metres (33 to 39 ft) in height with a 9 metres (30 ft) circumference, featured Evita's figure alongside three ballerinas, a globe, and two supporting statues, all in copper.

The fountain was located at the town's main entrance and served as Borgo Valsugana's primary symbol for over 30 years until its removal in 2002. In 2022, the Trentino provincial government approved funding for the fountain's restoration and reinstallation.

== Personal life ==
Casagrande was a member of the Alpini (Italian Alpine troops). His son Ezio worked in the family metalworking business.

== Legacy ==
After the closure of Casagrande's workshop in 1986, traditional copper and brass working largely disappeared from the Valsugana area. In 2018, former employees, including his son Ezio, organized an exhibition of Casagrande's works and those of other local metal artisans to document the region's lost metalworking tradition.
