= Shrine of Our Lady of Europe =

Catholic church in Gibraltar

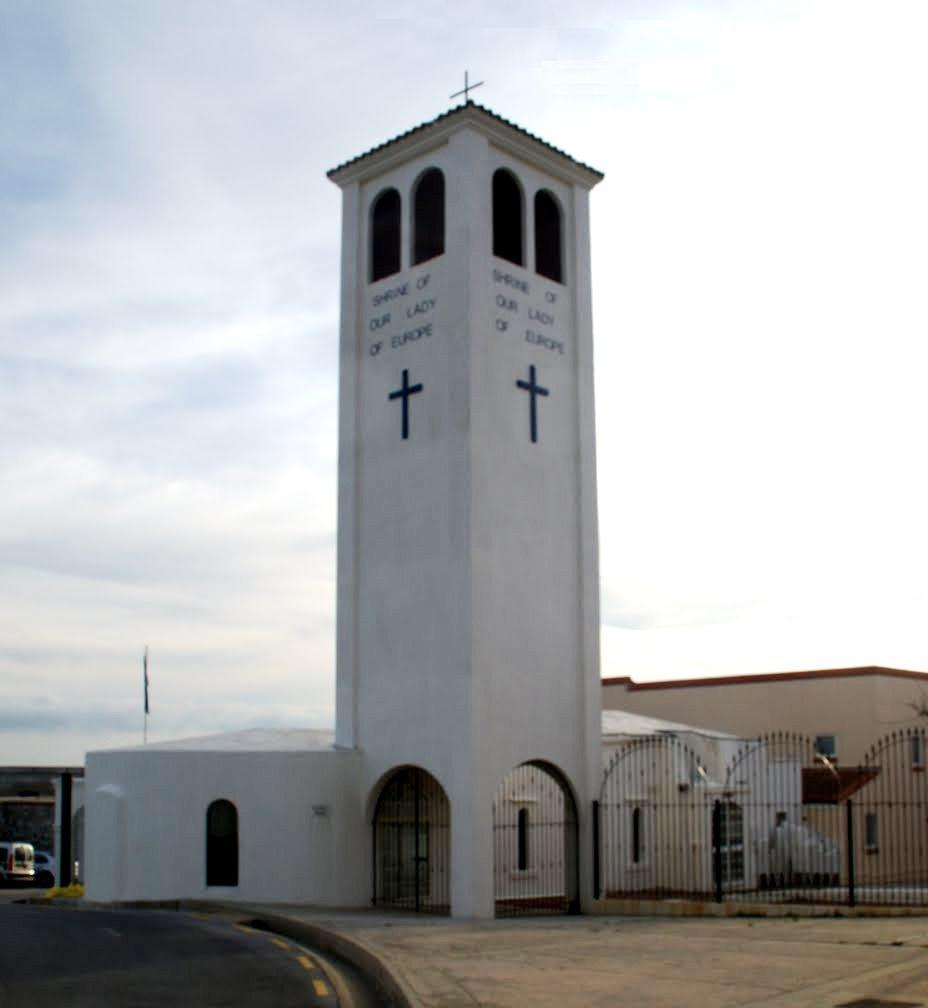
- Shrine of Our Lady of Europe

Religion
- Affiliation: Roman Catholic
- Province: Diocese of Gibraltar
- Ecclesiastical or organisational status: National Shrine, Parish
- Leadership: Fr. Charles Azzopardi
- Year consecrated: 20 August 1462

Location
- Location: Europa Point, Gibraltar
- Interactive map of Shrine of Our Lady of Europe
- Coordinates: 36.111332°N 5.348293°W

Architecture
- Groundbreaking: 14th century

Website
- www.ourladyofeurope.net

The Shrine of Our Lady of Europe is a Roman Catholic parish church and national shrine of Gibraltar located at Europa Point. The church is dedicated to Our Lady of Europe, the Catholic patroness of Gibraltar.

It belongs to the European Marian Network, which links twenty Marian sanctuaries in Europe (as many as the number of decades in the Rosary).

== History ==
=== The Spanish period ===
At the beginning of the 14th century, during the Moor period of the town, a small mosque was erected in Europa Point. It is known that during the first Spanish period (1309–1333) the mosque was turned into a Christian shrine.

On 20 August 1462, on St. Bernard of Clairvaux's feast day, the Spaniards recaptured Gibraltar from the Moors. They converted again the little mosque at Europa Point into a Christian shrine in honour of Our Lady as Patroness of Europe (Spanish: Ermita de la Virgen de Europa), with devout intention of consecrating to God, through Mary, the whole continent, from a place of prayer and worship at its southernmost point.

They built a large chapel at right angles to the mosque's east wall and the whole area became the Shrine of Our Lady of Europe. A statue of the Virgin and Child was installed in this shrine in the 15th century. The statue was quite small, only two feet in height, carved in wood and polychromed in royal red, blue and gold. The Virgin was seated in a simple chair, with the Child Jesus on her lap. Both were crowned and the Virgin held in her right hand a sceptre with three flowers denoting Love, Truth and Justice. The shrine prospered in fame and popularity, for well over two centuries. Ships passing through the Strait of Gibraltar saluted Our Lady as they passed Europa Point and mariners often came ashore with gifts to the shrine. Provisions were made by them for a constant supply of oil so that a light could be kept burning not only in front of the image but also in the tower. Therefore, the light kept burning in the tower above the chapel was the Gibraltar's first lighthouse.

In the 16th century, the Mediterranean coasts of Spain were the target of the Barbary pirates. In 1545, Gibraltar was attacked and looted by a lieutenant of Barbarossa, Hali Hamat. The shrine was sacked and all its valuables were stolen, but the statue of the Virgin and Child was respected. The shrine recovered and was protected by new walls, erected by Philip II. New notable gifts were received, such as a silver lamp, given in 1568 by Giovanni Andrea Doria, son of the great Genoese admiral Andrea Doria, and two massive silver lamps presented by John of Austria, upon his victory at the Battle of Lepanto (1571).

=== The British period ===
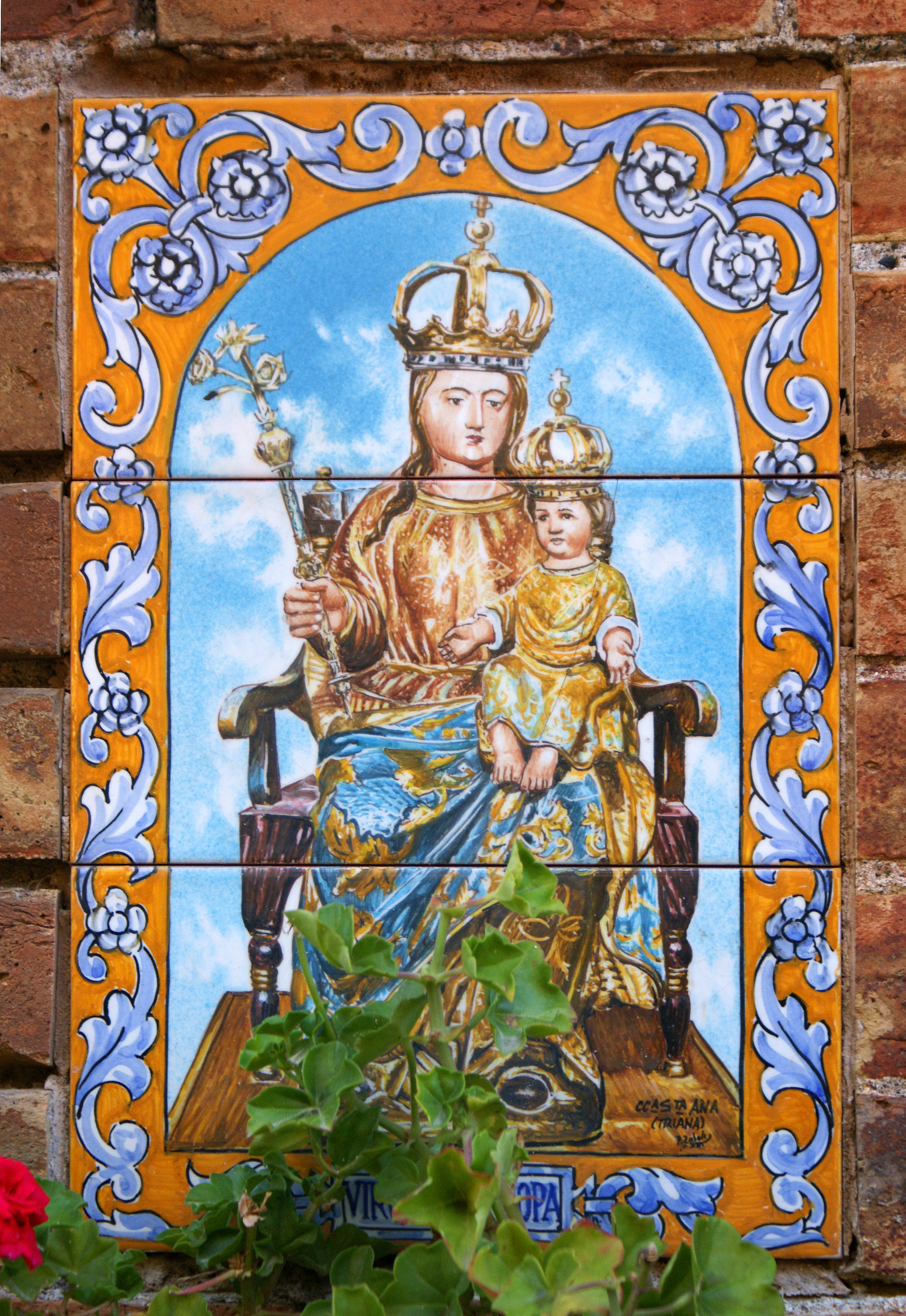
Gibraltar plaques - Our Lady of Europe, Gibraltar.

After the French bombing in 1693, the next attack to the shrine took place in August 1704 as the city was captured by a mainly Anglo-Dutch fleet on behalf of the pretender to the Spanish crown, the Archduke Charles. As the bombardment of the city began, most of the women and children of Gibraltar were evacuated to the shrine led by several priests. Part of the troops of Captain Edward Whitaker, who had landed at Rosia Bay, headed to the shrine and captured the women. They also looted:

... twelve silver lamps, candlesticks, lecterns, crowns, gems and consecrated vessels, the clothes of many families, who had withdrawn there, and when there was nothing else to rob, they broke off the head of the statue which is so venerated in Spain and the child Jesus and threw it among the stones.

Some women had been killed in a gunfight before the soldiers took the shrine, but did not suffer from further molestation when the shrine was sacked. The head of the statue of the Virgin and the child Jesus were broken off. Once broken, the remains were thrown out into the strait landing among the rocks below. However, as the statue was wooden, the remains floated out into the Bay of Gibraltar where they were found by a fisherman, who later delivered them to Juan Romero de Figueroa, the priest in charge at the parish of St. Mary the Crowned. Romero de Figueroa remained in the city even when the majority of the population left Gibraltar after the capture of the city and eventually took the statue's remains to Algeciras for safekeeping, one of the places where the former Spanish inhabitants of Gibraltar had settled down. The statue was hosted in a small chapel dedicated to St. Bernard, which was later renamed to the Chapel of Our Lady of Europe.

At the time of the capture of Gibraltar by the Anglo-Dutch fleet, the shrine, as all other Catholic places of worship in Gibraltar except for the Church of St. Mary the Crowned (now Gibraltar's Roman Catholic cathedral), was desecrated and ceased to be used, but taken over for military use. It also suffered heavy damage during the Great Siege of Gibraltar and subsequently demolished with a new one rebuilt on the same site in subsequent years.

In the early 1860s, the Vicar Apostolic of Gibraltar, John Baptist Scandella, petitioned for the return of the original statue from Algeciras. It was eventually returned to Gibraltar in 1864. As the Shrine of Our Lady of Europe remained in military hands, the statue was provisionally placed in a new chapel erected along Engineer Road. The new chapel included a marble altar donated afterwards by Pope Pius IX. During the Second World War, the statue was returned to the cathedral for safekeeping. After the War, the statue was once more relocated, this time to St. Joseph's Parish Church, the closest church to Europa Point.

The building erected at the place of the old Shrine of Our Lady of Europe remained property of the Ministry of Defence until 1961. It had been an army storehouse for oil and packing cases. Since 1928 it had been used as a library for the garrison, but with the outbreak of World War II, it was returned to a storage facility. By 1959, the military authorities, which had begun to withdraw many military installations in Gibraltar, noted that it was no longer required and decided to demolish it. However, this never happened and due to the efforts of Bishop John Healy it was ceded to the Diocese on 17 October 1961, in a private ceremony. Restoration works began in 1962. For the first time in 258 years, a mass was celebrated at the Shrine on 28 September 1962. The statue was finally transferred in public procession from St. Joseph's Parish Church to the Shrine on 7 October 1967. In the early 1970s, the building underwent changes. The statue of Our Lady remains in the Shrine to this day. in 1997, the sanctuary was rebuilt, and the statue restored.

== Recent years ==
=== Papal approval ===
In 1979 Pope John Paul II officially approved the title of Our Lady of Europe as Patroness of Gibraltar, and subsequently the shrine was restored.

=== Jubilee ===
Upon the 700th anniversary of the devotion to Our Lady of Europe, the shrine received the Golden Rose, a rare gift given by the Pope Benedict XVI in May 2009.

== See also ==
- Roman Catholicism in Gibraltar
- Roman Catholic Diocese of Gibraltar
- Shrine of Our Lady of Africa
