= Chapel of Our Lady of Europe =

Roman Catholic chapel in Andalusia, Spain

Chapel of Our Lady of Europe Capilla de Nuestra Señora de Europa (in Spanish)
- previously: Chapel of St. Bernard (Spanish: Capilla de San Bernardo)
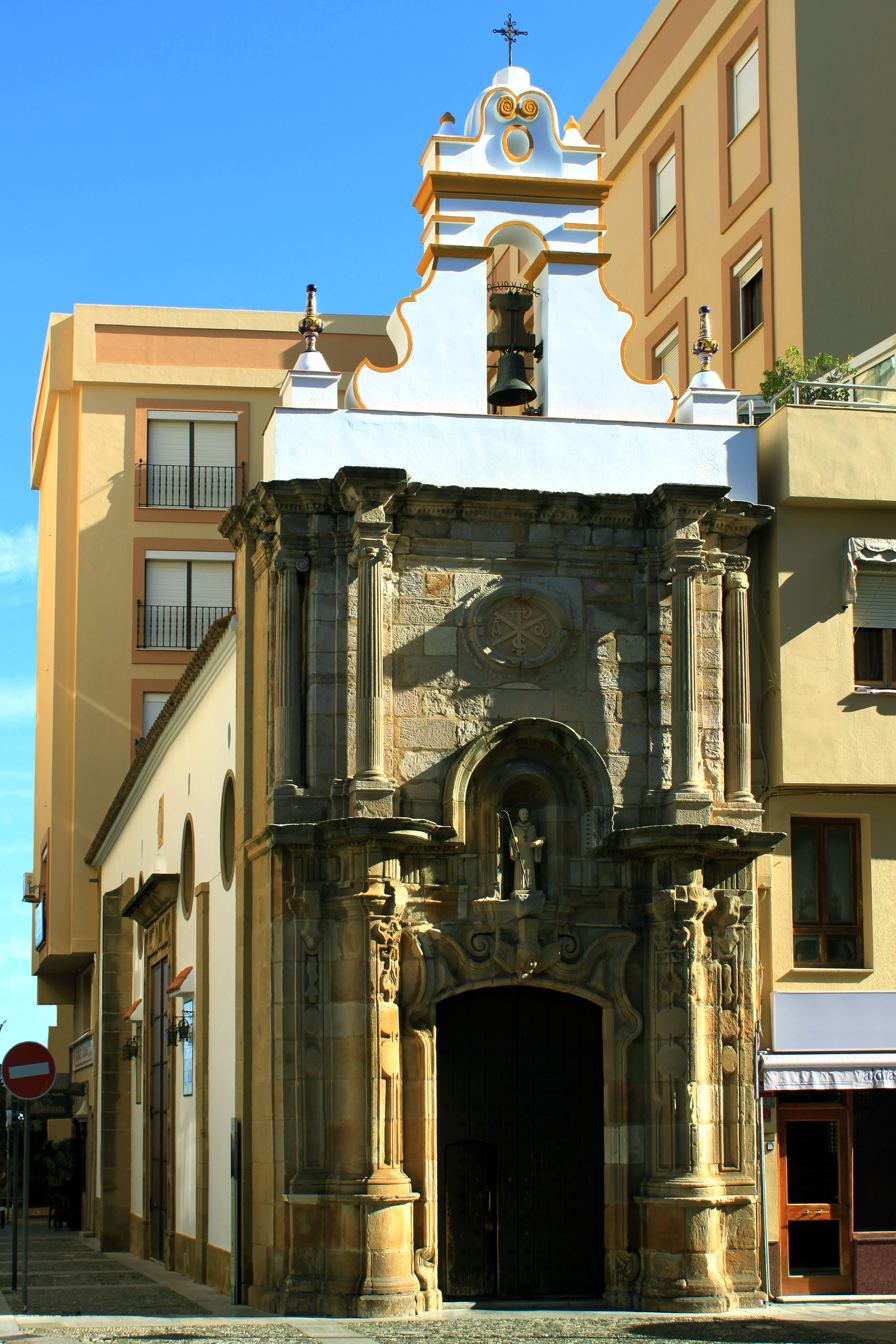
- Façade of the chapel

Religion
- Affiliation: Roman Catholic
- Province: Diocese of Cádiz and Ceuta
- Ecclesiastical or organisational status: Chapel
- Leadership: Bishop Rafael Zornoza Boy
- Year consecrated: 1690 (St. Bernard); 1704 (Our Lady of Europe)

Location
- Location: Plaza Alta, Algeciras, Spain
- Interactive map of Chapel of Our Lady of Europe; Capilla de Nuestra Señora de Europa (in Spanish)
- Coordinates: 36.131065°N 5.447556°W

Architecture
- Architect: Torcuato Cayón
- Style: Baroque
- Founder: Gálvez family
- Groundbreaking: 1695
- Completed: 1769
- Spanish Cultural Heritage
- Official name: Capilla de Nuestra Señora de Europa
- Type: Non-movable
- Criteria: Monument
- Designated: 1981
- Reference no.: RI-51-0004487

The Chapel of Our Lady of Europe (Spanish: Capilla de Nuestra Señora de Europa) is a Roman Catholic chapel located in the High Square (Spanish: Plaza Alta) of Algeciras (Spain). The popularly known "Capillita de Europa" (English: Small Chapel of Europe) is considered as the foundational element of the modern city of Algeciras. It was the host of the statue of the Virgin and the Child kept in the Shrine of Our Lady of Europe from the capture of Gibraltar by the Anglo-Dutch fleet in 1704 to 1864.

== Description ==
It was built in its current form in 1769, since the original building was severely affected by the 1755 Lisbon earthquake and had to be demolished. The first chapel had been dedicated to St. Bernard, patron saint of Gibraltar and its Campo, and was placed in the cortijo (farm) of one of the wealthiest families of Gibraltar, the Gálvez, in 1690, with the authorization of the bishop of Cádiz. It was declared Bien de Interés Cultural in 1981.

In 1704, following the Capture of Gibraltar by an Anglo-Dutch fleet on behalf of the Archduke Charles, claimant to the Spanish throne, almost all the population left the town. Some of the refugees built their houses by the chapel; in theory they were provisional buildings, since they were entrusting that Gibraltar would be recovered soon. However, with the passage of the time, the provisional settlement became the seed of a new town, beginning in this way the modern history of Algeciras after his destruction in 1379. The hermitage gave shelter to the statue of Our Lady of Europe. The statue of the Virgin and the Child was venerated in Gibraltar, in the Shrine of Our Lady of Europe. At the time of the capture, the shrine was looted and the statue of the Virgin and Child was broken and its remains thrown out to sea. As the statue was carved from wood, the pieces were recovered by a fisherman who found them floating in the Bay of Gibraltar and later delivered them to Juan Romero de Figueroa, the priest in charge at the Church of St. Mary the Crowned and St. Bernard in Gibraltar. Romero de Figueroa remained in the town after the capture and eventually took the pieces of the statue to Algeciras for safekeeping in the former Chapel of St. Bernard, which was dedicated then to Our Lady of Europe and named Chapel of Our Lady of Europe (Spanish: Capilla de Nuestra Señora de Europa). The original statue was returned to Gibraltar in 1864.

The design belongs to the architect Torcuato Cayón; it possesses an alone Barrel vault and a dome sustained by pendentives, this dome is divided in eight sections, in them and in the pendentives the Apostles are represented.

The Facade possesses two bodies and belfry, on the door a niche exists with an image of St. Bernard, patron saint of the city, placed in recent times. It was plundered in 1931 and then sold by the bishopric to an individual in 1936, during the decade of 1940 it was in complete abandon as store of a workshop of mechanics. Later in 1943 it was restored by the town hall. In 1989 it proceeded to a new restoration, necessary since the building of his left side was destroyed.

It is the see of the Brotherhood of the Cristo Atado a la Columna (Christ Tied to the Column), work of José Román Corzanego and of María Santísima de las Lágrimas (Holy Mary of the Tears), work of the Salesian workshops of Seville.
