= Catholic Church in Gibraltar =

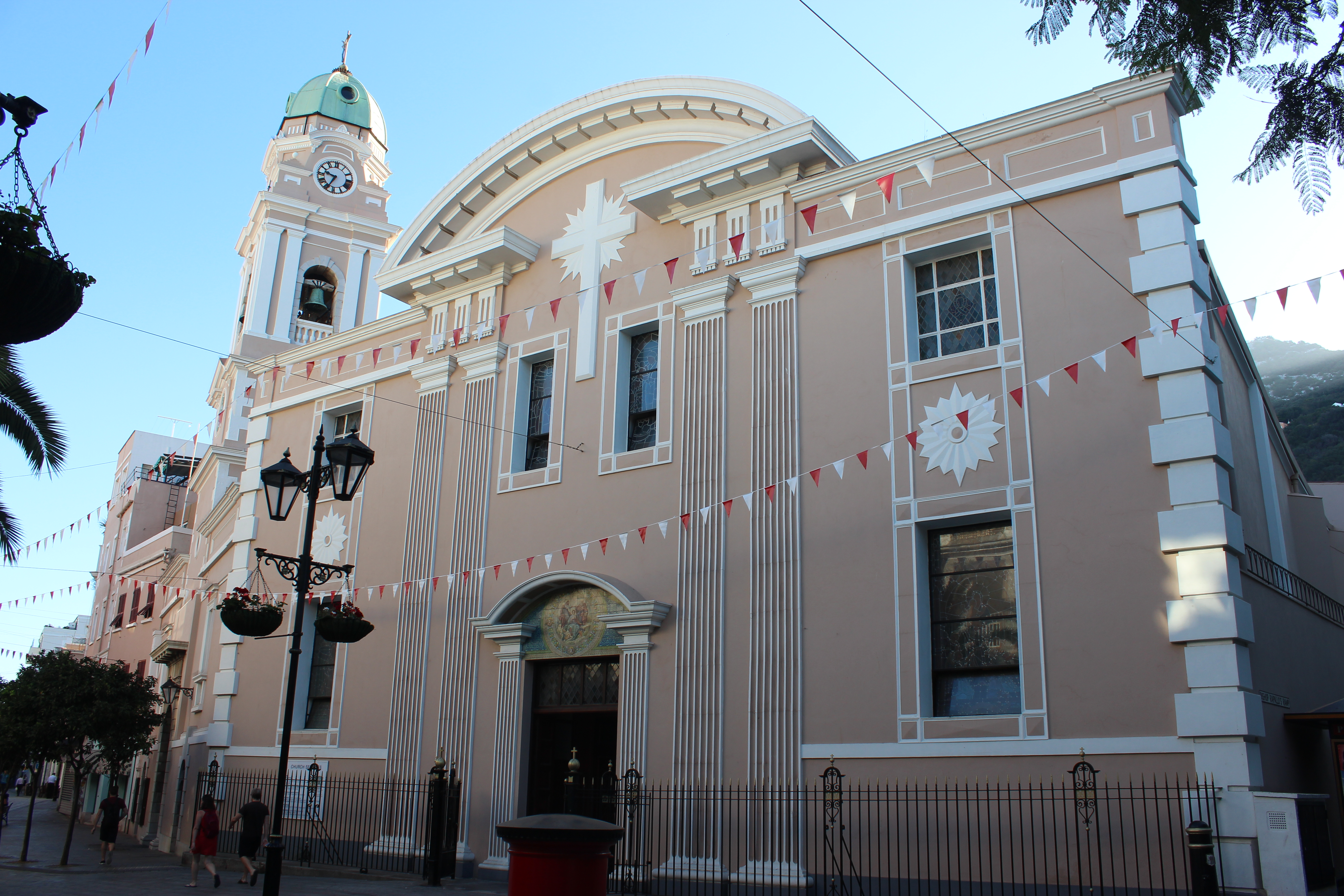
Cathedral of St. Mary the Crowned

The Catholic Church in Gibraltar is part of the worldwide Catholic Church, under the spiritual leadership of the Pope in Rome. There are an estimated 23,000 baptised Catholics in Gibraltar, making up 72 percent of the population.

Gibraltar is a single diocese led by the Bishop of Gibraltar and immediately subject to the Holy See. The incumbent, Carmelo Zammit, who was appointed Bishop of Gibraltar on 24 June 2016 and received episcopal ordination on 8 September 2016, was installed there on 24 September 2016.

== Places of worship ==
The primary centre of Catholic worship in Gibraltar is the Cathedral, but there are also six churches and a shrine.

=== Cathedrals ===
- Cathedral of St. Mary the Crowned

=== Churches ===
- St. Theresa's Parish Church
- St. Paul's Parish Church
- St. Joseph's Parish Church
- St. Bernard's Church
- Sacred Heart Parish Church
- Our Lady of Sorrows Church

=== Shrines ===
- Shrine of Our Lady of Europe
