= Richard Joseph Fitzgerald =

- Bishop of Gibraltar
- Church: Catholic Church
- Diocese: Diocese of Gibraltar
- In office: 25 May 1927 – 15 February 1956
- Predecessor: Henry Gregory Thompson
- Successor: John Farmer Healy

Orders
- Ordination: 15 August 1905
- Consecration: 9 October 1927 by John Harty

Personal details
- Born: 12 August 1881 Midleton, County Cork, United Kingdom of Great Britain and Ireland
- Died: 15 February 1956 (aged 74)

Styles of Richard Joseph Fitzgerald
- Reference style: The Right Reverend
- Spoken style: My Lord
- Religious style: Bishop

Richard Joseph Fitzgerald (12 August 1881 – 15 February 1956) was an Irish-born Roman Catholic prelate who served as the Bishop of Gibraltar from 1927 to 1956.

Born in Midleton, County Cork, Ireland on 12 August 1881, he was ordained to the priesthood on 15 August 1905. He served as a curate in Macrrom County Cork. He served as vice-rector of the Irish College at Salamanca, in Spain, before he was appointed the Bishop of the Diocese of Gibraltar by Pope Pius XI on 25 May 1927. His consecration to the Episcopate took place on 9 October 1927; the principal consecrator was the Most Reverend John Harty, Archbishop of Cashel, with the Most Reverend James Roche, Bishop of Ross and the Right Reverend Peter Amigo, Bishop of Southwark, serving as co-consecrators.

Bishop Fitzgerald died in office on 15 February 1956, aged 74.

Catholic Church titles
Preceded by Henry Gregory Thompson	Bishop of Gibraltar; 1927–1956	Succeeded by John Farmer Healy
