= Edward Rapallo =

Monsignor Edward Rapallo
- Roman Catholic Bishop of Gibraltar
- Diocese: Roman Catholic Diocese of Gibraltar
- Installed: 5 July 1973
- Term ended: 6 February 1984
- Predecessor: John Farmer Healy
- Successor: Bernard Patrick Devlin

Personal details
- Born: 1 March 1914 Gibraltar
- Died: 6 February 1984 (aged 69) Gibraltar
- Buried: Cathedral of St. Mary the Crowned
- Denomination: Roman Catholic
- Residence: Gibraltar

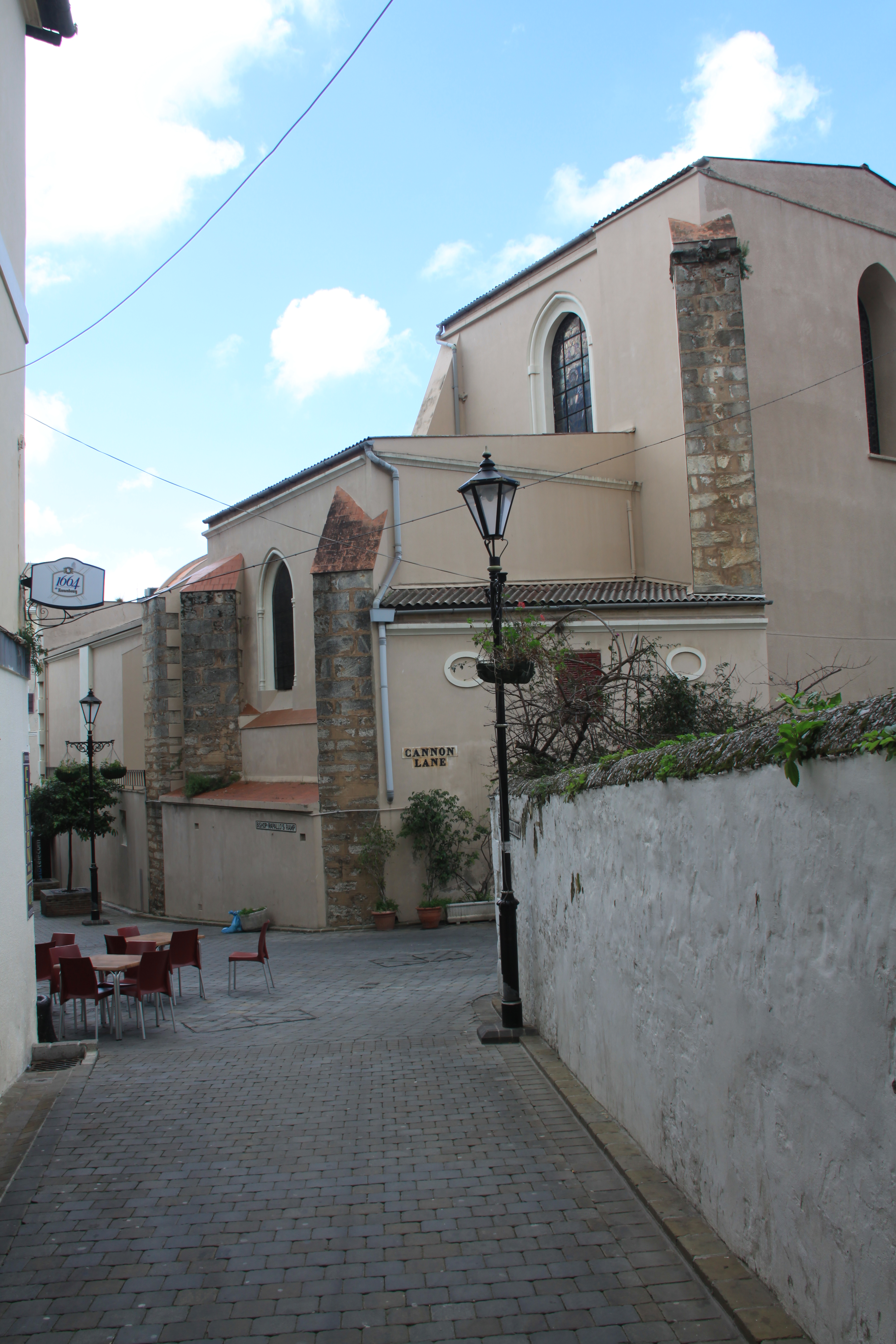
Bishop Rapallo's Ramp and Cannon Lane (to the right) meet in Gibraltar

Edward Rapallo (1 March 1914 – 6 February 1984) was the third Gibraltarian born Roman Catholic Bishop of Gibraltar following in the footsteps of Bishop Scandella and his successor Bishop Canilla.

== Biography ==
Rapallo was born in Gibraltar on 1 March 1914 and had been ordained a priest by the time he was 23. He served 46 years as a priest with over ten of them as Bishop of Gibraltar. The ceremony to establish him as Bishop had been conducted inside the RAF Gibraltar aircraft hangar.

Rapallo died suddenly in Gibraltar on 6 February 1984. Michael Bowen, Archbishop of Southwark, who had assisted at his consecration as bishop in 1973, returned to the Rock for his funeral. Bowen praised Rapallo's pastoral skills and his ability to bring together the Jewish, Indian and Christian communities of Gibraltar.

== Legacy ==
Rapallo was responsible for establishing Our Lady of Europe as one of the patron saint of Gibraltar and petitioned to have her feast day moved to 5 May to coincide with Europe Day. Rapallo also reconsecrated the Shrine of Our Lady of Europe. A pedestrianised street next to the Cathedral of St. Mary the Crowned in Gibraltar, was renamed Bishop Rapallo's Ramp (formerly Church Lane).
