= Remigio =

Remigio may refer to:

- Remigio (given name)
- Remigio (surname)
- Meanings of minor planet names: 58001–59000#672
