= Bishop of Gibraltar =

The Bishop of Gibraltar may refer to the ordinary of the Roman Catholic or Anglican Diocese of Gibraltar:

- Roman Catholic Bishop of Gibraltar
- Bishop in Europe, (Anglican Bishop of Gibraltar) in Europe
