= John Farmer Healy =

Jamaican-born Roman Catholic prelate

- Bishop of Gibraltar
- Church: Catholic Church
- Diocese: Diocese of Gibraltar
- In office: 18 July 1956 – 17 February 1973
- Predecessor: Richard Joseph Fitzgerald
- Successor: Edward Rapallo

Orders
- Ordination: 11 June 1927 by Peter Amigo
- Consecration: 11 October 1956 by Gerald O'Hara

Personal details
- Born: 3 December 1900 Kingston, Crown Colony of Jamaica and Dependencies, British Empire
- Died: 17 February 1973 (aged 72)

Styles of John Farmer Healy
- Reference style: The Right Reverend
- Spoken style: My Lord
- Religious style: Bishop

John Farmer Healy CBE (3 December 1900 − 17 February 1973) was a Jamaican-born Roman Catholic prelate who served as the Bishop of Gibraltar from 1956 to 1973.

Born in Kingston, Jamaica on 3 December 1900, he was ordained to the priesthood on 11 June 1927. He was appointed the Bishop of the Diocese of Gibraltar by Pope Pius XII on 18 July 1956. His consecration to the Episcopate took place on 11 October 1956; the principal consecrator was the Most Reverend Gerald O'Hara, Bishop of Savannah, Georgia, USA, with the Right Reverend Cyril Cowderoy, Archbishop of Southwark, England and the Right Reverend John Petit, Bishop of Menevia, Wales, serving as co-consecrators. Bishop Healy participated in all the four sessions of the Second Vatican Council, held between in 1962 and 1965.

He died in office on 17 February 1973, aged 72.

Catholic Church titles
Preceded by Richard Joseph Fitzgerald	Bishop of Gibraltar; 1956–1973	Succeeded by Edward Rapallo
