= Bernard Patrick Devlin =

British-based Irish Roman Catholic bishop

Monsignor Bernard Patrick Devlin KC*HS CMG GMH
- Roman Catholic Bishop Emeritus of Gibraltar
- Diocese: Roman Catholic Diocese of Gibraltar
- Installed: 6 January 1985
- Term ended: 14 April 1998
- Predecessor: Edward Rapallo
- Successor: Charles Caruana

Orders
- Ordination: 9 December 1945

Personal details
- Born: 10 March 1921 Youghal, County Cork, Ireland
- Died: 15 December 2010 (aged 89) Clergy House, Cannon Lane, Gibraltar
- Buried: The Crypt, Cathedral of St. Mary the Crowned, Gibraltar
- Denomination: Roman Catholic
- Residence: Artillery House, Cannon Lane, Gibraltar

Bernard Patrick Devlin, KC*HS, CMG, GMH (10 March 1921, Youghal — 15 December 2010, Gibraltar) was an Irish clergyman of the Roman Catholic Church. He served as fifth bishop of the Roman Catholic Diocese of Gibraltar from 1985 to 1998.

== Early life and education ==
Devlin was born in Youghal, County Cork, Ireland, on 10 March 1921, the only son of Richard and Mary (née Hill). His education began in 1927 at the Loreto Convent in Youghal and he later attended the Christian Brothers School in 1933. Devlin finished completed his schooling in 1939 at the Cistercian College in Dublin and concluded his ecclesiastical studies in 1945 at the Pontifical Beda College in Liverpool.

== Priesthood ==
Devlin was ordained a priest on 9 December 1945 at the Cathedral of St John the Evangelist, Portsmouth, United Kingdom. He arrived in Gibraltar on 29 June 1946.

Devlin was appointed Parish Priest of St. Theresa's Church in 1974 and Vicar General of the diocese in 1975. On 20 October 1984 it was announced that he would succeed the late Edward Rapallo as Roman Catholic Bishop of Gibraltar and this was later confirmed on 14 November of that year.

He, together with six other priests from around the world, was ordained bishop by Principal Consecrator Pope John Paul II and co-consecrators Cardinal Eduardo Martínez Somalo and Cardinal Duraisamy Simon Lourdusamy on 6 January 1985 at St. Peter's Basilica, Vatican City. A group of over 200 people travelled from Gibraltar to the Vatican City to witness the event.

Devlin retired as Bishop of Gibraltar on 14 February 1998 and was succeeded by Bishop Charles Caruana on 24 May of the same year.

== Awards ==
On 30 March 1985, at a ceremony held at the Cathedral of St. Mary the Crowned, Archbishop Michael George Bowen invested Bishop Devlin as a Knight Commander (with star) of the Equestrian Order of the Holy Sepulchre of Jerusalem.

He was created Commander of the Order of St Michael and St George by Queen Elizabeth II.

Devlin was also bestowed with the Freedom of the City of Gibraltar, and as such, was later entered into the Roll of Recipients of the Gibraltar Medallion of Honour in 2008.

== Death ==
Bishop Emeritus Devlin died at the age of 89, in the early morning of 15 December 2010 at the cathedral's Clergy House. By noon his body had been moved to St. Theresa's Church by Monsignors Paul Bear and Charlie Azzopardi and other clergy, escorted by two riders of the Royal Gibraltar Police, where his body lay in state until his funeral. The coffin bearing his body was then transferred to the City Hall at 4:30pm on 17 December from where it was carried in procession by members of the Royal Gibraltar Regiment and essential services to the Cathedral of St. Mary the Crowned via Parliament. The procession was headed by the drums and bagpipes of the Gibraltar Sea Scouts and flanked by the Knights of the Holy Sepulchre, behind the Knights of St Gregory the Great, and local and visiting clergy including the Bishop of Cádiz and priests from the Campo de Gibraltar. A funeral mass was celebrated at 5:00pm in the cathedral by Bishop Ralph Heskett. The congregation was headed by Governor of Gibraltar Sir Adrian Johns, Chief Minister of Gibraltar Peter Caruana, Leader of the Opposition Joe Bossano and other local dignitaries and representatives from various faiths. His body was later laid to rest in the Cathedral Crypt as is customary with bishops.

Bishop Emeritus Devlin's death came just two months after the death of his successor as Bishop of Gibraltar, Charles Caruana.
