= St. Bernard's Church =

St. Bernard's Church, or similar, may refer to:

in Gibraltar

- St. Bernard's Church, Gibraltar, a symbol of Roman Catholicism in Gibraltar

in the Netherlands

- Saint Bernard Church (Ubachsberg), monumental church, Ubachsberg, Limburg

in the United States

(by state then city)

- St. Bernard Church (Rockville, Connecticut)
- Saint Bernard Church (Alpena, Michigan), a Michigan State Historic Site
- Church of St. Bernard (Saint Paul, Minnesota)
- St. Bernard's Church and Parish House, Bernardsville, New Jersey, NRHP-listed
- Church of St. Bernard (Manhattan), a former Roman Catholic parish which combined with the Church of Our Lady of Guadalupe (Manhattan).
- St. Bernard's Church (Akron, Ohio), listed on the NRHP in Akron, Ohio
- St. Bernard's Catholic Church (Burkettsville, Ohio), listed on the NRHP in Mercer County, Ohio as St. Bernard Catholic Church and Rectory
- St. Bernard's Catholic Church (Hoven, South Dakota), listed on the NRHP in Potter County, South Dakota
- St. Bernard Church and Cemetery, Camden, West Virginia, NRHP-listed
- St. Bernard Catholic Church (Madison, Wisconsin)

== See also ==
- Saint Bernard (disambiguation)
