= Henry Gregory Thompson =

Welsh-born Roman Catholic bishop

Henry Gregory Thompson O.S.B.
- Bishop of Gibraltar
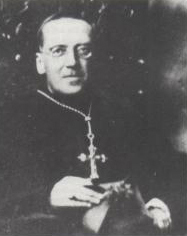
- Church: Catholic Church
- Diocese: Diocese of Gibraltar
- In office: 10 November 1910 – 25 May 1927
- Predecessor: Remigio Guido Barbieri
- Successor: Richard Joseph Fitzgerald
- Other post: Titular Bishop of Thermopylae (1927-1942)

Orders
- Ordination: 19 October 1902
- Consecration: 21 December 1910 by Peter Amigo

Personal details
- Born: 27 March 1871 Mold, Flintshire, United Kingdom of Great Britain and Ireland
- Died: 27 October 1942 (aged 71)

Styles of Henry Gregory Thompson, O.S.B.
- Reference style: The Right Reverend
- Spoken style: My Lord
- Religious style: Bishop

Henry Gregory Thompson, O.S.B. (27 March 1871 – 27 October 1942) was a Welsh-born Roman Catholic prelate who served as the Bishop of Gibraltar from 1910 to 1927.

Born in Mold, Flintshire, Wales on 27 March 1871, he was ordained a priest of the Order of Saint Benedict on 19 October 1902. He was appointed the Bishop of the Diocese of Gibraltar by Pope Pius X on 10 November 1910. His consecration to the Episcopate took place on 21 December 1910; the principal consecrator was the Right Reverend Peter Amigo, Bishop of Southwark, with the Right Reverend Frederick Keating, Bishop of Northampton (later Archbishop of Liverpool) and the Right Reverend Francis Mostyn, Bishop of Menevia (later Archbishop of Cardiff), serving as co-consecrators.

Bishop Thompson resigned the episcopal see of Gibraltar on 25 May 1927 and appointed Titular Bishop of Thermopylae on 15 July 1927. He died on 27 October 1942, aged 71.

Catholic Church titles
Preceded by Remigio Guido Barbieri as Vicar Apostolic of Gibraltar	Bishop of Gibraltar; 1910–1927	Succeeded by Richard Joseph Fitzgerald as Bishop of Gibraltar
