= Rapallo (surname) =

Rapallo is a surname. Notable people with the surname include:

- Charles A. Rapallo (1823–1887), American lawyer and politician
- Edward Rapallo (1914–1984), Gibraltarian Roman Catholic bishop
