= Gibraltar Cathedral =

Gibraltar Cathedral may refer to:

- Cathedral of the Holy Trinity, Gibraltar (Anglican)
- Cathedral of St. Mary the Crowned (Roman Catholic)
