= St. Bernard's Church, Gibraltar =

St. Bernard's Church
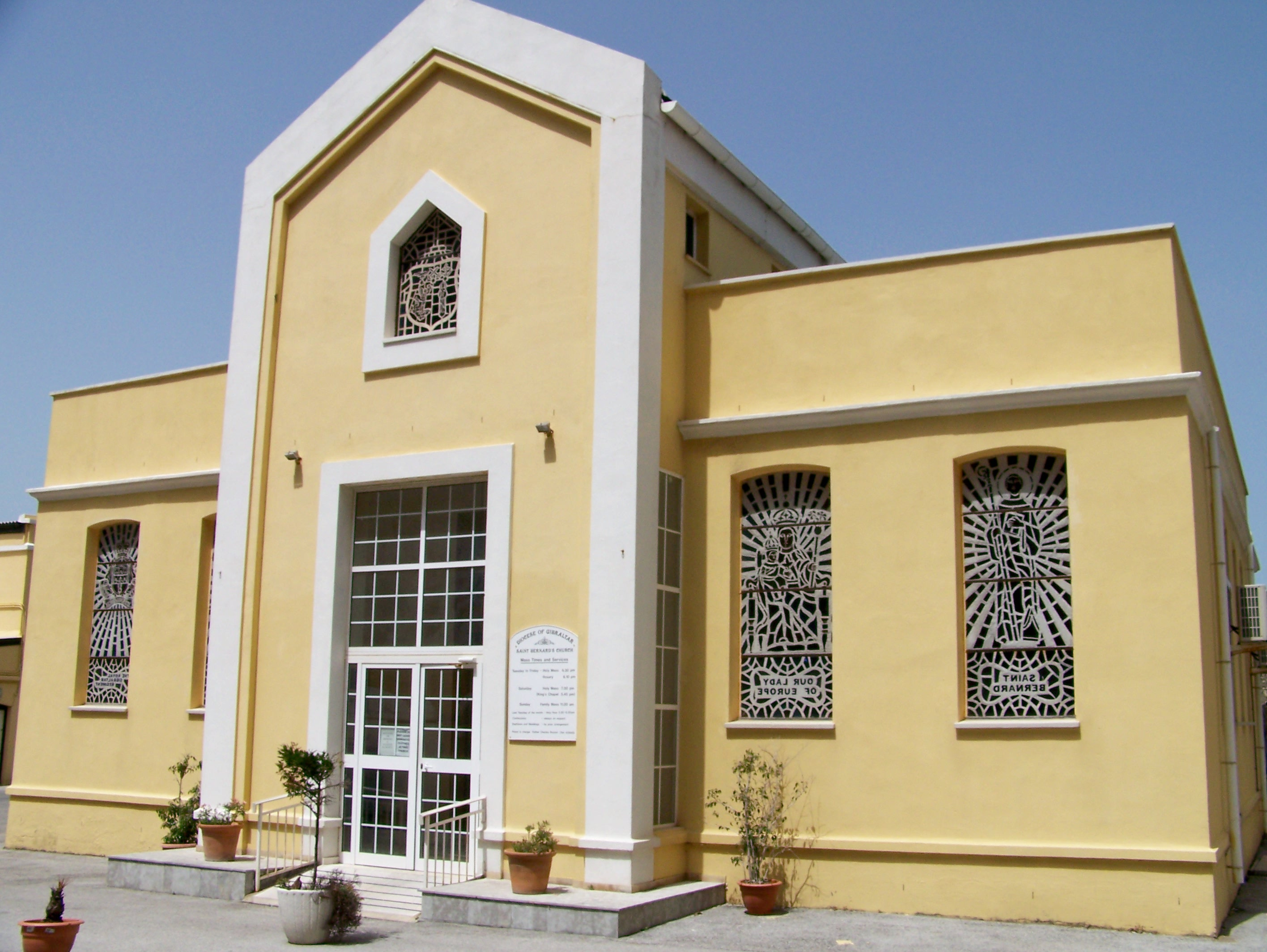
- Main entrance to St. Bernard's Church in its eastern façade
- St. Bernard's Church
- 36.114299°N 5.348414°W
- Location: Europa Road
- Country: Gibraltar
- Denomination: Roman Catholic
- Website: stbernardschurchgibraltar.com

Administration
- Diocese: Roman Catholic Diocese of Gibraltar

St. Bernard's Church is one of eight Roman Catholic churches in the British Overseas Territory of Gibraltar.

== Description ==
The church is located on Europa Road near Europa Point, Gibraltar's southernmost tip. It is a parish church of the Roman Catholic Diocese of Gibraltar and is named after one of Gibraltar's two patron saints, Bernard of Clairvaux.

The church enjoys views over the Bay of Gibraltar and North Africa including the Jebel Musa mountain on the southern coast of the Strait of Gibraltar.

== History ==
St. Bernard's started off as the Roman Catholic church of the British Armed Forces in Gibraltar. The military had traditionally provided various Anglican churches around the Rock for the garrison and they felt they should also provide a church for the Roman Catholics amongst them. A small disused armoury at Europa Road was identified for conversion into a simple church. The church was serviced by Royal Navy Roman Catholic padres but also attended by some Gibraltarian civilians.

Following the rationalisation of the Rock's military facilities, the British Forces came to the conclusion that, as Gibraltar's population was predominantly Roman Catholic and church services were held in English, this would already cater for the Roman Catholic servicemen's religious needs. However, considering that St. Bernard's already had a healthy community of churchgoers, mostly made up of Gibraltarian civilians but also with temporary yet active members of the forces, it was decided that the community should not be lost. Responsibility over the church was therefore taken over by the Roman Catholic Diocese of Gibraltar in the early 1990s after naval padre Vincent Docherty had arranged for the priest's house and church hall to be transferred together.

However, it wasn't until the episcopacy of Bishop Charles Caruana that the diocese secured a loan from the Government of Gibraltar to convert the small boxlike church, which suffered from water ingress at the time, into an aesthetically pleasing modern church with all the amenities.

The first civilian to be appointed as priest in charge of St. Bernard's by the Diocese was Fr. Francis Little who was responsible for the church's transition from a military place of worship to a civilian one. Francis was also the first civilian priest to take on the role of honorary chaplain to the forces. This role has since been fulfilled by the priest in charge of St. Bernard's.
