= James Bellord =

English Roman Catholic bishop

- Vicar Apostolic of Gibraltar
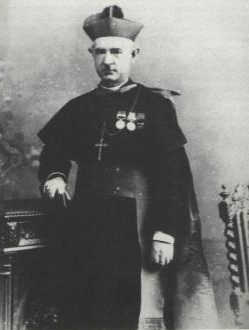
- Church: Catholic Church
- See: Apostolic Vicariate of Gibraltar
- In office: 16 February 1899 – 29 July 1901
- Predecessor: Gonzalo Canilla
- Successor: Remigio Guido Barbieri
- Other post: Titular Bishop of Milevum (1899-1905)

Orders
- Ordination: 12 March 1870
- Consecration: 1 May 1899 by James Laird Patterson

Personal details
- Born: 26 February 1846 London, United Kingdom of Great Britain and Ireland
- Died: 11 June 1905 (aged 59) Southend-on-Sea, Essex, United Kingdom of Great Britain and Ireland

Styles of James Bellord
- Reference style: The Right Reverend
- Spoken style: My Lord
- Religious style: Bishop

James Bellord (26 February 1846 – 11 June 1905) was an English-born Roman Catholic bishop who served as the Vicar Apostolic of Gibraltar from 1899 to 1905.

Born in London, England on 26 February 1846, he served as a military chaplain. He was appointed the Vicar Apostolic of Gibraltar and Titular Bishop of Milevum by Pope Leo XIII on 16 February 1899. His consecration to the Episcopate took place on 1 May 1899; the principal consecrator was the Right Reverend James Laird Patterson, Auxiliary Bishop of Westminster, with the Right Reverend Robert Brindle, Auxiliary Bishop of Westminster (later Bishop of Nottingham) and the Right Reverend Francis Bourne, Bishop of Southwark (later Cardinal-Archbishop of Westminster), serving as co-consecrators.

Bishop Bellord resigned in 1901 and died at Southend-on-Sea on 11 June 1905, aged 59, and was buried at the crypt in the chapel attached to Nazareth House, a convent run by the Sisters of Nazareth.

Catholic Church titles
Preceded by Gonzalo Canilla	Vicar Apostolic of Gibraltar; 1839–1856	Succeeded by Remigio Guido Barbieri
