= Remigio Guido Barbieri =

Italian-born Gibraltarian Roman Catholic bishop

Remigio Guido Barbieri O.S.B.
- Vicar Apostolic of Gibraltar
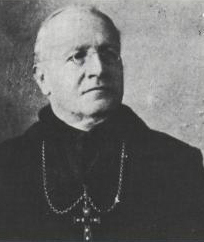
- Church: Catholic Church
- Diocese: Apostolic Vicariate of Gibraltar
- In office: 29 July 1901 – 15 April 1910
- Predecessor: James Bellord
- Successor: Henry Gregory Thompson
- Other post: Titular Bishop of Theodosiopolis in Armenia (1901-1910)

Orders
- Ordination: 24 March 1861
- Consecration: 10 November 1901 by Vincenzo Vannutelli

Personal details
- Born: 5 September 1836 Siena, Grand Duchy of Tuscany
- Died: 15 April 1910 (aged 73)

Styles of Remigio Guido Barbieri, O.S.B.
- Reference style: The Right Reverend
- Spoken style: My Lord
- Religious style: Bishop

Remigio Guido Barbieri, O.S.B. (5 September 1836 – 15 April 1910) was an Italian-born Roman Catholic bishop who served as the Vicar Apostolic of Gibraltar from 1901 to 1910.

== Life ==
Remigio Barbieri was born in Siena in the Grand Duchy of Tuscany of a noble Florentine family on 5 September 1836. He professed as a member of the Order of Saint Benedict on 20 June 1857 and ordained a priest of that order on 24 March 1861. Barbieri devoted the greater part of his life to the education of youth.

In 1896 he became Abbot of San Pietro, Perugia. He was appointed the Vicar Apostolic of Gibraltar and Titular Bishop of Theodosiopolis by Pope Leo XIII on 29 July 1901. His consecration to the Episcopate took place on 10 November 1901; the principal consecrator was Vincenzo Vannutelli, Cardinal-Bishop of Palestrina, with Giustino Adami, Titular Archbishop of Caesarea Ponti, and Edmund Stonor, Titular Archbishop of Trapezus, serving as co-consecrators. He penned the article on the "Vicariate of Gibraltar" for the Catholic Encyclopedia.

Bishop Barbieri died in office on 15 April 1910, aged 73.

Catholic Church titles
Preceded by James Bellord as Vicar Apostolic of Gibraltar	Vicar Apostolic of Gibraltar; 1901–1910	Succeeded by Henry Gregory Thompson as Bishop of Gibraltar
