= Remigio (given name) =

Remigio is a given name. Notable people with the given name include:

- Remigio Guido Barbieri (1836–1910), Italian-born Roman Catholic bishop
- Remigio Morales Bermúdez (1836–1894), Peruvian politician
- Remigio Cantagallina (c. 1582–1656), Italian etcher
- Remigio Fernández (born 1965), Paraguayan football manager and former footballer
- Remigio dei Girolami (1235–1319), Italian Dominican theologian
- Remigio Ángel González, Mexican businessman
- Remigio Herrera (1811/1816 – 1905), Cuban freedman
- Remigio Molina (1970–2016), Argentine boxer
- Remigio Crespo Toral (1860–1939), Ecuadorian writer

== See also ==
- Remigio (surname)
