= Diocese of Gibraltar =

The Diocese of Gibraltar is a jurisdiction within both the Anglican and Catholic Church.

- Diocese of Gibraltar in Europe (Anglican)
- Diocese of Gibraltar (Roman Catholic)
