= Remigio (surname) =

Remigio is an Italian surname. Notable people with the surname include:

- Carmela Remigio (born 1973), Italian operatic soprano
- Davide Remigio (born 1963), Australian-Italian composer
- Nikko Remigio (born 1999), American football player
- Porfirio Remigio (1939–2025), Mexican cyclist

== See also ==
- Remigio (given name)
