= Gonzalo Canilla =

Monsignor Gonzalo Canilla
- Roman Catholic Vicar Apostolic of Gibraltar
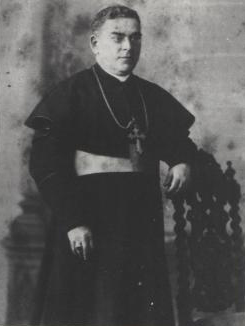
- Gonzalo Canilla as Vicar Apostolic of Gibraltar
- Diocese: Roman Catholic Diocese of Gibraltar
- Installed: 8 March 1881
- Term ended: 18 October 1898
- Predecessor: John Baptist Scandella
- Successor: James Bellord

Personal details
- Born: 24 May 1846 Gibraltar
- Died: 18 October 1898 (aged 52) Gibraltar
- Denomination: Roman Catholic
- Residence: Gibraltar

Gonzalo Canilla (Gonzallo Canilla y Moreno) (Gibraltar, 24 May 1846 - 18 October 1898) was a Roman Catholic Bishop and Vicar Apostolic of Gibraltar. There were nearly fifty arrests made to allow Canilla to enter his own church in Gibraltar in 1881.

== Early life ==
Gonzalo Canilla was born in Gibraltar on 24 May 1846. He became a priest and secretary to his fellow Gibraltarian Bishop Scandella who was Vicar Apostolic of Gibraltar.

== Career ==
When Scandella died in 1880 his secretary Canilla was almost unanimously recommended for his vacant position. Of the eight priests in Gibraltar only Canilla himself and a Greek priest called Stephanapolis dissented. Canilla was appointed new Vicar Apostolic of Gibraltar on 8 Mar 1881 despite objections from rich people in Gibraltar. He was also appointed Titular Bishop of Lystra as nearly all Vicars Apostolic of Gibraltar were also appointed Titular Bishops. Canilla was only the second Gibraltarian to be appointed to this position. He was formally appointed Bishop on 12 Jun 1881 but he still had to enter his cathedral.

The objections to Canilla as bishop from the merchant class was because his predecessor, Scandella, had resisted a new tobacco tax designed to reduce tobacco smuggling into Spain. Scandella had traveled to London to lobby the Members of Parliament. Scandella had also tried to enlist the influential members of the Exchange and Commercial Library. Although nominally in charge of the library, this committee were the emerging civil authority in Gibraltar. When Scandella went to London the Library committee sent its own delegation to Manchester sending notes back complaining about Scandella.

When Scandella died these people remembered that Canilla has been Scandella's loyal secretary. Whilst Canilla was being appointed in London by Bishop Manning there were moves in Gibraltar. A "Committee of Elders" was formed who held public meetings and contacted the press noting that Canilla was too young and inexperienced. When Canilla returned they prevented him from entering his own church although the Governor's office blamed Canilla for being too passive. (The governor Robert Napier, 1st Baron Napier of Magdala was away.) In December Canilla again tried to enter his church but a mob formed and the local police advised Canilla to withdraw. Canilla complained but the governor sided with the mob and about ten of them broke into the church and ejected Alfred Weld, an English Jesuit, who had been sent to investigate the problems in Gibraltar. Weld had gathered over 400 signatures from locals in support of Canilla so that when the Governor advised London that nothing could be done he got a strong reply. London had received a different account from Canilla and the governor was told that his police should be able to keep order especially inside a military fortress.

Meanwhile, the "Elders" had raised the stakes and said that they intended to take possession of the church and install Stephenapolis as "chief priest". Canilla was sent back to his church on 2 March 1881 now that the Governor was under strict instruction to install him in his church. The police could not be relied upon and twenty soldiers were quickly appointed as extra policeman. When the new force came to the church they found it was occupied by 200 men and the police had to make four dozen arrests to establish order. The following trials saw these people given fines and warnings and one person was given six months hard labour. But Canilla now had his church not only in spirit but in law as the governor arranged for the title deeds of the church to be given to the new titular Bishop.

When Canilla died in 1898 he was recognised for support he made of workers rights during disputes and for the good work he had done for the Jews and for the poor but particularly in the continuing improvement he encouraged in education. Nearly 2,000 children in Gibraltar were receiving primary education when he died. It was noted that whilst in nearby La Linea 10% of the Catholics there went to church, in Gibraltar the figure was 50%.

Canilla's successor was nearly another Gibraltarian, Peter Amigo, however Amigo's father had been one of the leading players at the Exchange and Commercial Library where the dispute had started about Canilla so Amigo went on be a Bishop of Southwark and James Bellord became Canilla's successor.

== See also ==
- Catholic Church in Gibraltar
