= Nunc pro tunc =

Latin expression in common legal use

Nunc pro tunc (English translation: "now for then") is a Latin expression legal term originating in England, now in common use in other countries. In general, a ruling nunc pro tunc applies retroactively to correct an earlier ruling.

== Legal definition ==
Nunc pro tunc may apply when "a judgment is entered, or document enrolled, so as to have the same legal force and effect as if it had been entered or enrolled on an earlier day". That type of order originated from the Court of Chancery from 1388. In 1805, Lord Chancellor Lord Eldon, said, "The Court will enter a Decree nunc pro tunc, if satisfied from its own official documents, that it is only doing now what it would have done then".

Nunc pro tunc may apply also to acts that are allowed after the legally-allotted time to do them has passed. For example, in the probate of an estate, if property, such as lands, mineral interests, etc., are discovered after the final decree or order, a nunc pro tunc order may include the discovered lands or assets into the estate and clarify how they were meant to be distributed. Also, when a court clerk makes a clerical error or a mistake on the public record, a nunc pro tunc order may correct the record for the accurate reflection of judicial proceedings and agreements that were reached between parties.

=== Corporate application ===
A corporation may have been created by an individual, but since a corporation in the United States has the standing in law of a person although it is not a natural person, its human creator may go bankrupt, and the assets of the corporation may be seized to satisfy unpaid taxes. If someone buys those assets from the tax authority and the corporation shell passed into other hands, the person who bought the assets may also buy the corporation shell, and after paying the applicable corporate franchise tax, that person may claim that the corporation is nunc pro tunc the original corporation with the original assets.

=== Internal Revenue Service ===
Some taxpayers file returns or other documents with the Internal Revenue Service (IRS) that have the phrase "nunc pro tunc" stamped or written on the face of the return or document. Those taxpayers assert that the phrase "nunc pro tunc" has some legal effect in reducing, eliminating, or altering in some way their federal income tax liability or other obligations under the tax laws. According to the IRS, that is considered to be a "frivolous" argument, which is subject to $5,000 fine. Inserting the phrase "nunc pro tunc" or similar arguments on a return or other document submitted to the IRS has no legal effect.

=== Litigation ===
A judgment nunc pro tunc is an action by a trial court correcting a clerical, rather than judicial, error in a prior judgment. A nunc pro tunc may be signed even after the trial court loses its plenary power. For appellate purposes, a nunc pro tunc judgment that is correctly taken ordinarily does not extend appellate deadlines.

== Catholic Church ==
In the Catholic Church, a bishop's resignation is often accepted by the Holy See nunc pro tunc, which means it is tentatively accepted, but the Pope needs some time to locate and appoint a replacement for that diocese. The announcement of the new appointment is usually accompanied by actual acceptance of the outgoing bishop's resignation.
