= Carmelo Zammit =

Maltese priest

The Right Reverend Carmelo Zammit
- Bishop of Gibraltar
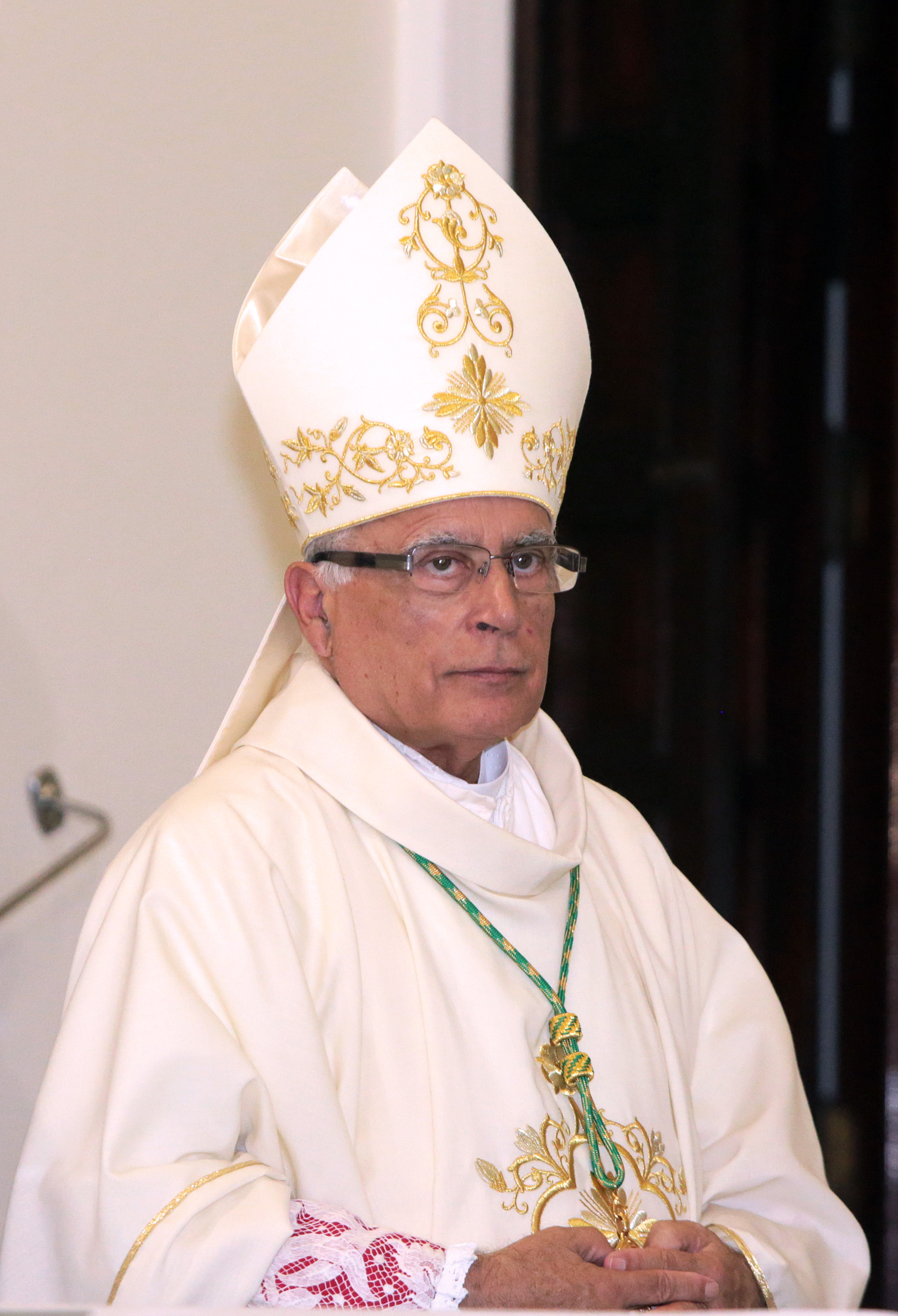
- Installation of Carmelo Zammit as Bishop of Gibraltar at the Cathedral of St Mary the Crowned
- Province: Immediately Subject to the Holy See
- Diocese: Gibraltar
- See: Gibraltar
- Appointed: 24 June 2016
- Installed: 24 September 2016
- Predecessor: Ralph Heskett
- Successor: Mons. Charles Azzopardi

Orders
- Ordination: 20 July 1974 by Michael Gonzi
- Consecration: 8 September 2016 by Vincent Nichols

Personal details
- Born: 19 December 1949 (age 76) Gudja, Malta
- Denomination: Roman Catholic
- Education: University of Malta
- Coat of arms: Carmelo Zammit's coat of arms

Carmelo Zammit (born 19 December 1949) is a Maltese Roman Catholic prelate and the Bishop Emeritus of Gibraltar. Zammit is the Grand Prior of the Gibraltar Lieutenancy of the Equestrian Order of the Holy Sepulchre of Jerusalem.

== Life ==
Zammit was born in Gudja, Malta, in 1949 and was ordained a priest in 1974. In 1976, Bishop Rapallo invited him to minister in Gibraltar. He holds a bachelor's degree in philosophy, Italian, and economics; a licentiate in theology from the University of Malta; and a licentiate in canon law from the Pontifical Lateran University, Rome. Before his appointment, he served in a number of pastoral roles in Gibraltar, including judicial vicar, episcopal delegate for Catholic education, school chaplain and parish priest. Upon returning to Malta in 1998, he became chancellor of the archdiocese and judge in the ecclesiastical tribunal. He also served as Canon of the Metropolitan Chapter, as President of the St. John's Co-Cathedral Foundation, and Judicial Vicar in the Archdiocese of Malta.

He was consecrated bishop on 8 September 2016 by Vincent Cardinal Nichols in St. Paul's Cathedral, Mdina. Archbishop Charles Scicluna of Malta and Bishop Ralph Heskett of Gibraltar acted as co-consecrators. He served as Bishop until 12th September 2025, whereupon reaching canonical retirement age, was succeeded by Bishop Monsignor Charles Azzopardi.

Catholic Church titles
Preceded by Ralph Heskett	Bishop of Gibraltar; 2016–	Incumbent
