= St. Paul's Church, Gibraltar =

St. Paul's Church
- St. Paul's Church, Gibraltar
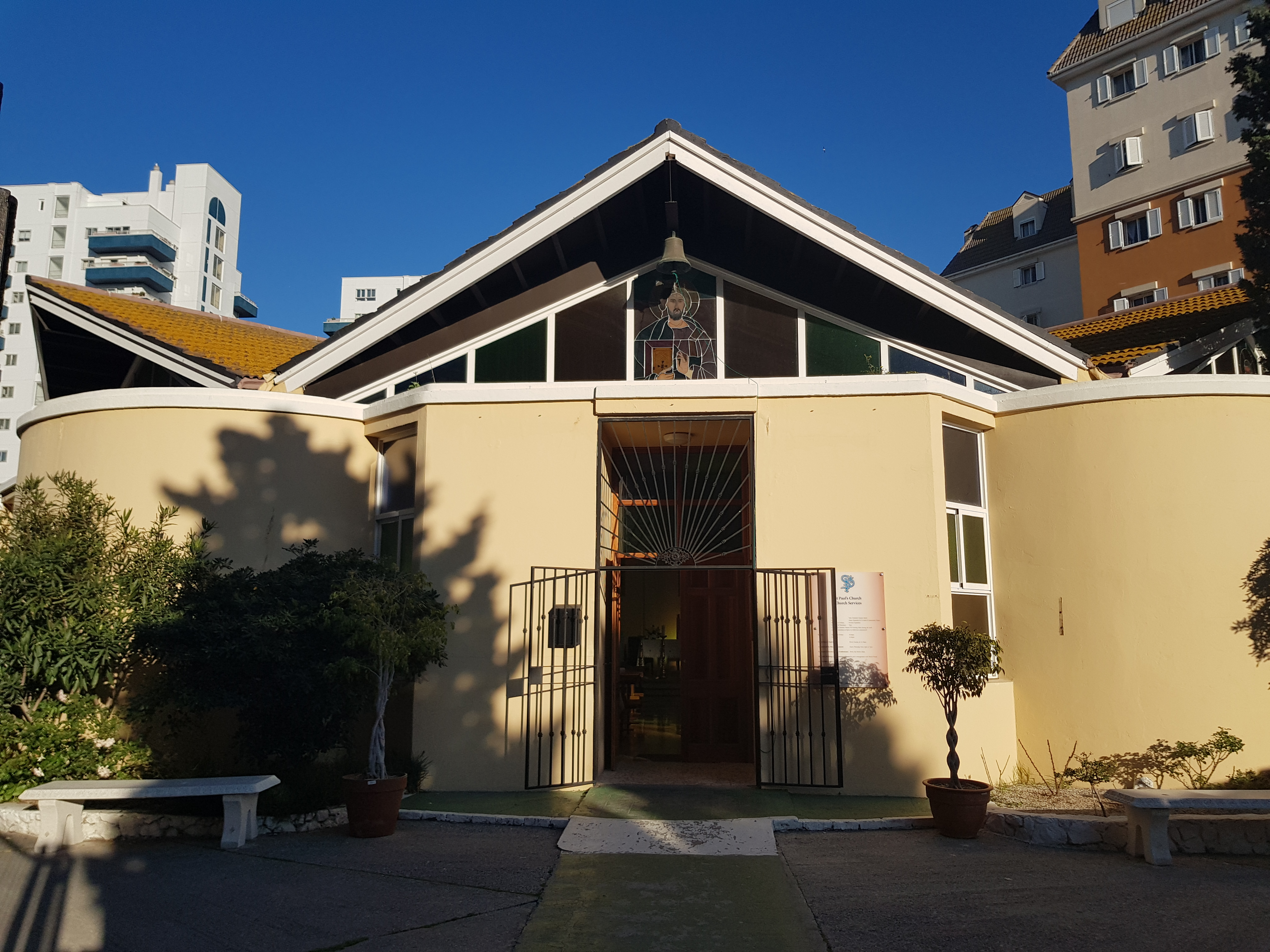
- St. Paul's Church
- 36.146123°N 5.355577°W
- Location: Varyl Begg Estate
- Country: Gibraltar
- Website: website

St. Paul's Church is a church in Gibraltar. It is located in northwestern Gibraltar, along Varyl Begg Estate.
