= Davide Remigio =

Australian composer (born 1963)

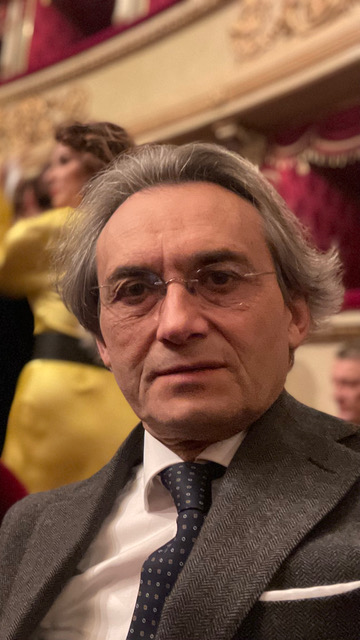

Background information
- Born: June 26, 1963 (age 62); Melbourne, Australia
- Origin: Australia, Italy
- Genres: Classical music
- Occupation: Composer
- Years active: 1974-present
- Labels: Universal Edition, Edipan, Casa Musicale Sonzogno, Australian Autumn Music, Casa Ricordi
- Spouse: Marialuisa Campanella(2000-present)
- Website: www.davideremigio.com

Davide Remigio (born 1963) is an Australian-Italian contemporary composer known for founding the compositional technique known as Quaternary Music. He has worked as a composer, lecturer, and theorist, with a catalogue of works spanning orchestral, choral, chamber, opera, and electronic genres, and has been active internationally since the 1980s.

== Biography ==
Remigio was born in Melbourne to Italian parents and returned to Italy in 1969, where he began his musical studies at an early age. He studied violin and music theory as a child and composed his first work, Giga for solo violin, at age 11. He later continued formal studies in composition, conducting, ensemble instrumentation, and electronic music at the Conservatorio di Musica “Luisa D’Annunzio” in Pescara and the National Academy of Santa Cecilia in Rome, where he completed a Master of Music in composition in 1992 under the direction of Franco Donatoni. In 1991, he also studied music for film at the Accademia Musicale Chigiana in Siena with Ennio Morricone.

== Career ==
Remigio has held teaching positions in music composition at several Italian conservatories, including those in Potenza, Bari, and L’Aquila, and currently teaches composition at the Conservatorio di Musica “Giuseppe Verdi” in Milan.

His works have been performed at major Italian and international venues, including the National Academy of Santa Cecilia and Auditorium Rai in Rome, the Teatro Comunale in Modena, the Ravello Festival, and on Dutch and Belgrade radio broadcasts, among others. Performances have also taken place in Australia and at centers for classical music in New York City.

In 1989 Remigio received the Silone Prize for Music for his work Homage to Silone for narrator and orchestra, and in 1993 the Gaudeamus Foundation of Amsterdam awarded his composition Mordenti for ensemble, which was performed on Dutch radio.

== Quaternary Music ==
In 1997 Remigio conceived Quaternary Music, a compositional technique in which a quadriad of four selected notes acts as the foundational harmonic core of a work. Within this method, the chosen four pitches serve as a defining griffé-sonora (sonic signature) that shapes the harmonic, structural, and coloristic identity of a piece, reducing reliance on expanded harmonic textures while fostering cohesive musical identity.

In addition to his compositional practice, Remigio has promoted quaternary music through lectures and workshops internationally, including presentations at the Vernadsky National Library in Kiev and at the University of California, Irvine.

== Compositions ==
Remigio’s output is extensive and includes early works composed during his youth (for example Duettino and Foglio d’album), chamber music, orchestral works, and works for solo instruments. Works have been published by major music publishers including Universal Edition (Vienna), Casa Musicale Sonzogno, Casa Ricordi, Edipan (Rome), and Australian Autumn Music (Melbourne).

Notable published compositions include Tuc for bells, Divertimento for guitar and harp, and Courage for soprano and orchestra, among many others.

== Work ==
- 1974 - Giga, for piano
- 1975 - Duettino, for two violins
- 1976 - Foglio d'album, for piano
- 1977 - Capriccio, for violin
- 1979 - Convesso, for timpani
- 1980 - Orizzonti Sonori for narrator, soprano, 2 pianos and 2 percussionists
- 1980 - Studio, for piano
- 1980 - Absolute schreibschrift, for piano
- 1982 - Foglio d'album II, for violin and piano
- 1982 - Lamento, for voice and piano
- 1985 - Tesi, for violin, cello, and piano
- 1988 - Il naso di Lulu, for sopran and piano
- 1989 - Hyades, for guitar
- 1989 - Soft, for violin, viola, cello, contrabass
- 1989 - Tejat, for piano
- 1991 - Antares for solo clarinet
- 1992 - LEM, for two violins
- 1992 - Tuc, for glockenspiel
- 1993 - Studi moderni, for accordion
- 1994 - Minimal, for piano
- 1995 - Brevis for mixed choir and piano
- 1997 - Alla Mamma, for piano and soprano
- 1997 - Divertimento, harp and guitar
- 1998 - Ardo si, ma non t'amo, for two violins, cello and harpsichord
- 1999 - European Songs for children's choir and orchestra
- 2000 - Cosentine Wind for sopran and wind orchestra
- 2001 - Il piccolo Elian, for narrator and ensemble
- 2004 - Auf dem berge for Sopran and piano
- 2005 - Teak, for contrabass
- 2005 - Celestino V(Davide Remigio-composer, Ignazio Silone-author of literary source, Davide Remigio-text author)
- 2005 - Cartolina a Mozart, for symphony orchestra
- 2008 - Canti lucani, for soprano, wind orchestra
- 2009 - Courage, for soprano and piano
- 2011 - Polish Landscape, for piano
- 2012 - Prelude, for flute, cello and accordion
- 2013 - Hands, for piano four hands
- 2013 - Alcor for oboe
- 2014 - Bari Prom, for piano
- 2015 - Autumn, for chamber orchestra
- 2016 - Transformation, for violin and cello
- 2017 - Ritual, for guitar
- 2018 - Garderns, for sax quartet and four percussionists
- 2020 - La dolce Mila, for soprano, flute, cello and piano
- 2021 - Singing the silence, for soprano, alto, tenor and bass

== Discography ==
- Italian National Music Committee, Davide Remigio works page,
- Universal Edition,
- Davide Remigio personal web-site, discography page.

== External sources ==
- Davide Remigio - Official Website,
- Universal Edition,
- Sonzogno page,
- Italian national music committee - Davide Remigio,
- Davide Remigio, Composizione | Operabase,
- Remigio Davide-Petruci Music Library ,
- Artisti - Remigio davide | Il Saxofono Italiano .
