= St. Joseph's Church, Gibraltar =

St. Joseph's Church
- St. Joseph's Church, Gibraltar
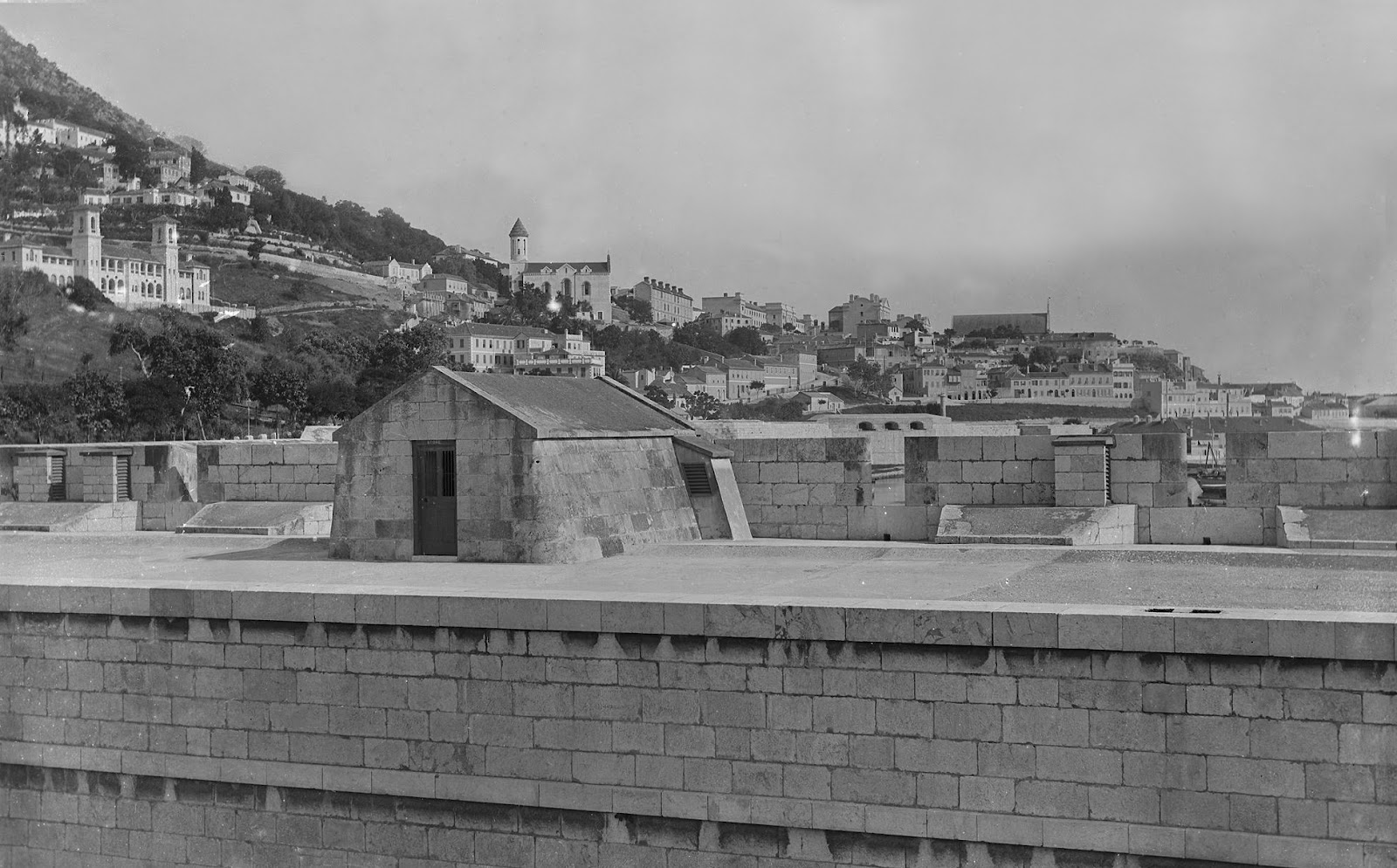
- St. Joseph's Church in the distance (1890)
- St. Joseph's Church
- 36.129253°N 5.35100°W
- Country: Gibraltar
- Website: church site

St. Joseph's Church is a church in Gibraltar. It is located above the northeastern side of Gibraltar Harbour. The church is on Rodger's Road. There is a school of the same name in the vicinity.
