= List of Roman Catholic bishops and vicars apostolic of Gibraltar =

Bishop of Gibraltar
- Bishopric

catholic
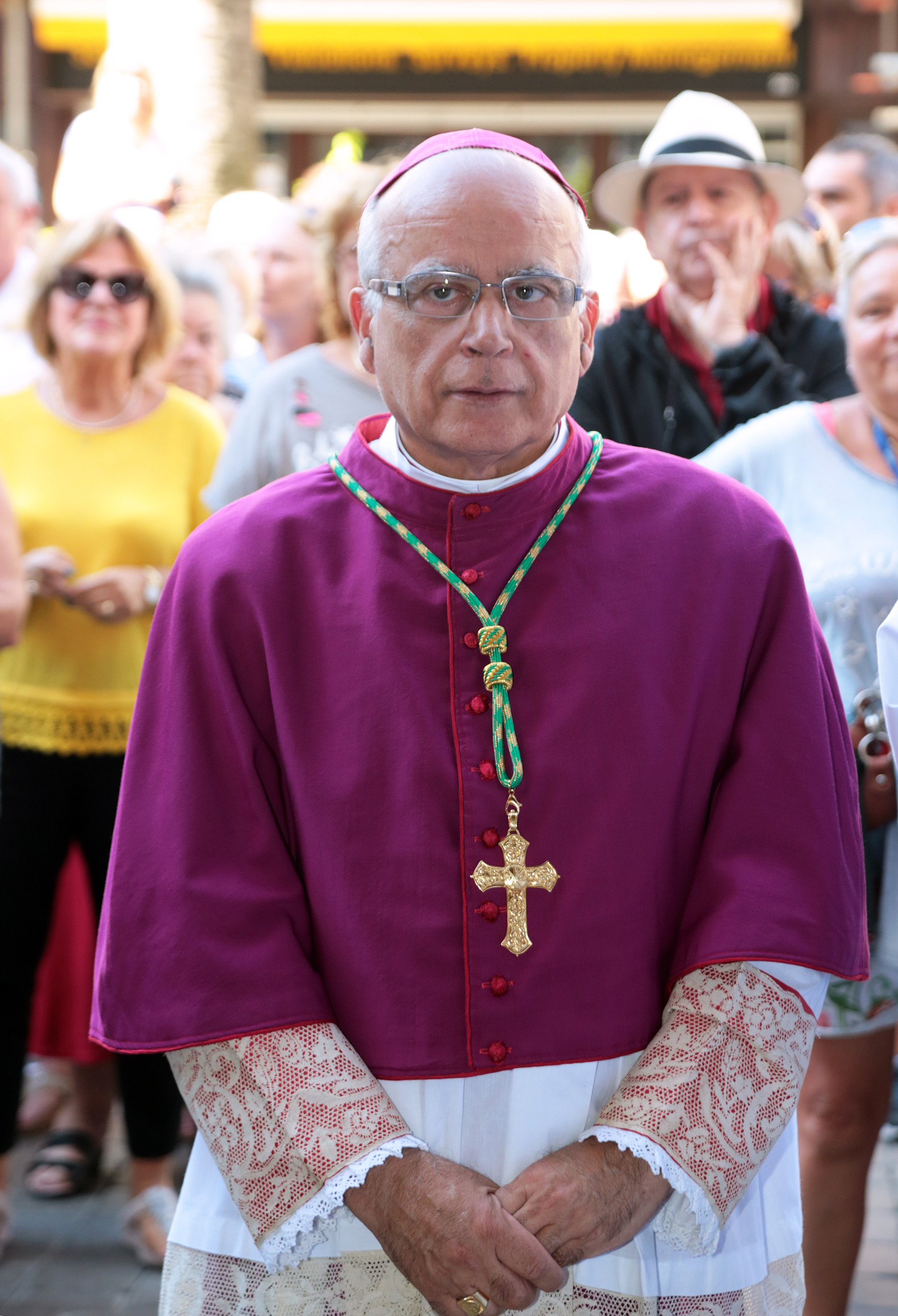
- Incumbent: Carmelo Zammit

Information
- First holder: Henry Gregory Thompson
- Established: 19 November 1910
- Diocese: Gibraltar
- Cathedral: St. Mary the Crowned

The Latin Bishop of Gibraltar is the ordinary of the Roman Catholic Diocese of Gibraltar, covering the British overseas territory of Gibraltar, which is exempt, i.e. immediately subject to the Holy See, not part of any ecclesiastical province, nor is it part of any (Spanish or British) episcopal conference.

The diocese's episcopal seat (cathedra) is located in the Cathedral of St. Mary the Crowned. The diocese also has a National Shrine of Our Lady of Europe.

The incumbent, Carmelo Zammit, who was appointed Bishop of Gibraltar on 24 June 2016 and received episcopal ordination on 8 September 2016, was installed there on 24 September 2016.

Lacking independence, the tiny territory (governed as British overseas territory, but claimed by Spain) had no diplomatic relations, so no papal diplomatic representation.

== History ==
- Established on 25 January 1816 as Apostolic Vicariate of Gibraltar (Gibilterra in Curiate Italian, Latin adjective Gibraltarien(sis)), on territory split off from the Spanish Diocese of Cádiz
- Promoted to the Diocese of Gibraltar on 19 November 1910.

== Statistics ==
As per 2014 it pastorally served 23,495 Catholics (79.8% of 29,431 total) on 6 km^{2} in 5 parishes with 8 priests (7 diocesan, 1 religious) and 2 lay religious (1 brother, 1 sister).

== Episcopal Catholic Ordinaries ==
=== Apostolic Vicars of Gibraltar ===
Roman Catholic Apostolic Vicars of Gibraltar
From	Until	Incumbent	Notes
1816	1839	John Baptist Nosardy Zino	Appointed vicar apostolic on 25 January 1816. Resigned in 1839.
1839	1856	Henry Hughes (born Ireland); Titular Bishop of Heliopolis in Augustamnica	Appointed vicar apostolic and titular bishop on 15 March 1839 and consecrated on 21 March 1841. Resigned in 1856 and died on 12 October 1860.
1857	1880	John Baptist Scandella (born Gibraltar); Titular Bishop of Antinoë	Appointed vicar apostolic and titular bishop on 28 April 1857 and consecrated on 30 November 1857. Died in office on 27 August 1880.
1881	1898	Gonzalo Canilla (born Gibraltar); Titular Bishop of Lystra	Appointed vicar apostolic and titular bishop on 8 March 1881 and consecrated on 12 June 1881. Died in office on 18 October 1898.
1899	1901	James Bellord (born England); Titular Bishop of Milevum	Appointed vicar apostolic and titular bishop on 16 February 1899 and consecrated on 1 May 1899. Resigned on 29 July 1901 and died on 11 June 1905.
1901	1910	Remigio Guido Barbieri (born Italy); Titular Bishop of Theodosiopolis (in Armenia)	Appointed vicar apostolic and titular bishop on 29 July 1901 and consecrated on 10 November 1901. Died in office on 15 April 1910.

=== Diocesan Bishops of Gibraltar ===
Roman Catholic Bishops of Gibraltar
From	Until	Incumbent	Notes
1910	1927	Henry Gregory Thompson (born England)	Appointed bishop on 10 November 1910 and consecrated on 21 December 1910. Resigned on 25 May 1927, appointed Titular Bishop of Thermopylae as emeritate on 15 July 1927, and died on 27 October 1942.
1927	1956	Richard Joseph Fitzgerald (born Ireland)	Appointed bishop on 25 May 1927 and consecrated on 9 October 1927. Died in office on 15 February 1956.
1956	1973	John Farmer Healy (born Jamaica)	Appointed bishop on 18 July 1956 and consecrated on 11 October 1956. Died in office on 17 February 1973.
1973	1984	Edward Rapallo (born Gibraltar)	Appointed bishop on 5 July 1973 and consecrated on 7 October 1973. Died in office on 6 February 1984.
1985	1998	Bernard Patrick Devlin (born Ireland)	Appointed bishop on 20 October 1984 and consecrated on 6 January 1985. Retired on 14 February 1998 and died on 15 December 2010.
1998	2010	Charles Caruana (born Gibraltar)	Appointed bishop on 14 February 1998 and consecrated on 24 May 1998. Retired on 18 March 2010 and died on 1 October 2010.
2010	2014	Ralph Heskett (born England)	Appointed bishop on 18 March 2010 and consecrated on 10 July 2010. Appointed Bishop of Hallam in England on 20 May 2014, but stayed on as Apostolic Administrator of Gibraltar 2014.07 – 2016.06.24.
2016		Carmelo Zammit (born Malta)	Appointed bishop on 24 June 2016. His consecration was on 8 September 2016 while his installation was on 24 September.

== See also ==
- List of Catholic dioceses in Spain, Andorra, Ceuta and Gibraltar
- Anglican Bishop in (continental) Europe, with see in Gibraltar

== Sources and external links ==
- GCatholic with Google map & - satellite photo
