= Appointment of Catholic bishops =

Process appointing bishops in the Catholic Church

The appointment of bishops in the Catholic Church is a complicated process. Outgoing bishops, neighbouring bishops, the faithful, the apostolic nuncio, various members of the Roman Curia, and the pope all have a role in the selection. The exact process varies based upon a number of factors, including whether the bishop is from the Latin Church or one of the Eastern Catholic Churches, the geographic location of the diocese, what office the candidate is being chosen to fill, and whether the candidate has previously been ordained to the episcopate.

== History ==
=== Early Church ===
It is unclear when the notion of a monarchial bishop emerged, but it is clear that by 200 a single bishop in charge of a metropolitan area became a universal norm without much controversy. Initially, bishops were chosen by the local clergy with approval from nearby bishops. "A newly elected bishop was installed in office and given his authority ... by the bishops who supervised the election and performed the ordination."

Examples of episcopal election in the early church include such notable figures as Ambrose of Milan. Episcopal election was so taken for granted that by the time of the Council of Nicaea (see below), it is mentioned as the normative method for selecting bishops, with approval of local metropolitans.

The bishops of the most important sees sought acceptance from Rome. Some early Church Fathers attest to the fact that the Church of Rome - in effect its diocese - was the central point of authority. They attest to the Church's reliance on Rome for advice, for mediation of disputes, and for guidance on doctrinal issues. They note, as Ignatius of Antioch (early 2nd century) does, that Rome "holds the presidency" among the other churches, and that, as Irenaeus (c. 2nd century) explains, "because of its superior origin, all the churches must agree" with Rome. They are also clear on the fact that it is full communion with Rome and the bishop of Rome that causes one to be in communion with the Catholic Church. This displays a recognition that, as Cyprian of Carthage (3rd century) puts it, Rome is "the principal church, in which sacerdotal unity has its source." Most of these references were to the entire Church of Rome as such, not necessarily to the bishop of Rome in his person, but after the role of the pope emerged, the church and its bishop became interpreted in a synonymous way.

=== Era of ecumenical councils ===
By the time of the First Council of Nicaea in 325, the metropolitan bishops of Alexandria, Antioch, and Rome had a role of the greatest importance in the selection. Canon 6 of the council acknowledged and codified an ancient custom giving jurisdiction over large regions to the bishops of Alexandria, Rome, and Antioch. Nicaea decreed that the consent of the metropolitan bishop was normally required:

Let the ancient customs in Egypt, Libya and Pentapolis prevail, that the Bishop of Alexandria have jurisdiction in all these, since the like is customary for the Bishop of Rome also. Likewise in Antioch and the other provinces, let the Churches retain their privileges. And this is to be universally understood, that if any one be made bishop without the consent of the Metropolitan, the great Synod has declared that such a man ought not to be a bishop. If, however, two or three bishops shall from natural love of contradiction, oppose the common suffrage of the rest, it being reasonable and in accordance with the ecclesiastical law, then let the choice of the majority prevail.

=== Era of Charlemagne ===
As part of the flourishing of culture and renewal under his reign, the Emperor Charlemagne commissioned one of the first major church-wide studies of the patristic era. This "golden age" or Carolingian Renaissance greatly influenced the identity of the Church. New texts were being discovered and disseminated at rapid pace in the late 700s and early 800s and patristic authorship became important for establishing a text's authority in Catholic theology. Unfortunately also at this time, a series of power struggles emerged between diocesan bishops and their metropolitans. As part of this struggle, a series of elaborate forgeries were produced, capitalizing on the cultural renaissance of the time and eagerness to discover new texts. The Pseudo-Isidorian Decretals asserted Roman papal power to depose and appoint bishops for the first time by deriving this power from forgeries of texts of the fathers of early church, interlaced with texts already known to be legitimate. These decretals had an enormous influence concentrating power of the pope in the Middle Ages, and were not uncovered as forgeries until the 1500s or universally acknowledged to be forgeries until the 1800s.

=== Medieval Church ===
Later, state authorities demanded their consent for the election of bishops. In medieval times, rulers demanded not only their consent to an election made by others but the right to choose the bishops directly. The Investiture Controversy changed that to some extent, but later concessions meant that many kings and other secular authorities exercised a right of appointment or at least of veto until the second half of the 20th century.

=== Centralization of papal power ===
For many years, the monarchs of the European states weighed in on the appointment of bishops.

In the early 19th century, state involvement in episcopal appointment was still so normal that, in spite of the opposition of the Church in Ireland to the proposed royal veto of the appointment of bishops, the Holy See was prepared to grant it to the British king. As late as the 20th century, Franz Joseph I of Austria-Hungary attempted to exercise the power of jus exclusivae to veto the election of Mariano Rampolla as pope during the 1903 papal conclave. The attempted veto was rejected by the conclave, but over the course of several ballots, Rampolla, who had been the leading candidate, lost support until the conclave elected Cardinal Giuseppe Sarto, who then became Pope Pius X. In his Constitution "Commissum Nobis" (1904), Pius X declared that the Apostolic See had never approved the civil veto, though previous legislation had not succeeded in preventing it, and he forbade any attempt to exercise it.

It was in 1871 that a radical shift in law and practice began to take place. In that year the Law of Guarantees gave the pope the right to choose the bishops of the Kingdom of Italy, all 237 of them, appointments that through the unification of Italy had fallen into the hands of King Victor Emmanuel II of Italy. Although the pope denounced the law, he nevertheless profited by it to appoint, within the first seven months that followed, 102 new Italian bishops. Before the unification of Italy the various rulers made the appointments, with the pope doing so only for the Papal States. The 1905 French law on the Separation of the Churches and the State had a similar effect for appointing bishops in the territories ruled by France. In the early 20th century, papal appointment of Catholic bishops was an almost universal practice except where, in virtue of the Spanish Patronato real and the Portuguese Padroado, the appointment of Catholic bishops remained in the hands of the civil authorities.

Thus the 1917 Code of Canon Law was able to finally affirm that, in the Latin Church, the decision rests with the pope. In the course of the 20th century, remaining privileges enjoyed by secular authorities gradually diminished, especially since the Second Vatican Council (1962–1965). A decree of the Second Vatican Council states, "Since the apostolic office of bishops was instituted by Christ the Lord and pursues a spiritual and supernatural purpose ... the right of nominating and appointing bishops belongs properly, peculiarly, and per se exclusively to the competent ecclesiastical authority." The Council stated its wish that in the future, "no more rights or privileges of election, nomination, presentation, or designation for the office of bishop be granted to civil authorities." This principle was incorporated into the 1983 Code of Canon Law.

Canon 377 provides some flexibility by stating that the pope appoint bishops or "confirms those legitimately elected". For example, this provides latitude for the bishops elected in most German dioceses, those elected in some parts of Austria and Switzerland, and accommodates the president of France's right to designate bishops for Strasbourg and Metz.

Archbishop Marcel Lefebvre threatened to consecrate his own bishops in order to continue the traditionalist movement. Academic Paul P. Mariani writes that this likely impacted the decision to make the 1983 Code of Canon Law so detailed regarding appointing bishops. In 1988, Pope John Paul II declared that Lefebvre had been automatically excommunicated for consecrating four bishops that year without permission and despite John Paul II's express prohibition.

== Pastoral bishops in the Latin Church ==
Canon 401 §1 of the 1983 Code of Canon Law states that archdiocesan/diocesan bishops (including cardinals) are requested to submit their resignation to the pope on reaching the age of 75 years. Some do so earlier with a view to having the resignation take effect immediately on reaching 75. Bishops should also offer their resignation if ill-health or other grave problems render them unsuited for fulfilling their office. The letter of resignation goes first to the apostolic nuncio or apostolic delegate, the pope's representative in the country or region. He forwards it to whichever department of the Holy See has particular responsibility for the selection of bishops for the country in question: the Dicastery for Evangelization in the case of mission countries, the Dicastery for the Eastern Churches in the case of even Latin bishops in certain Middle Eastern countries and Greece, the Secretariat of State if the country's government has been given the right to present objections of "a general political nature" (not of a party-political kind) or is involved in some other way, but generally the Dicastery for Bishops. The congregation presents the bishop's offer of resignation to the pope, who has a range of options from rejecting the offer of resignation to accepting it with immediate effect. In the case of diocesan bishops who have reached 75 years of age, the usual decision is to accept the resignation but with effect only from the date of publication of the appointment of a successor, a decision known as acceptance nunc pro tunc (now for then).

If the resignation is accepted with immediate effect, the episcopal see becomes vacant on publication of the pope's decision. Vacancy of a see may also occur because of a bishop's transfer to another see or position, or because of his death. In the case of a nunc pro tunc acceptance, the see does not become vacant immediately, but the process that leads to the appointment of a successor begins without delay.

One important element in selecting a bishop is the list of priests, of both the diocesan and the religious clergy, that the bishops of the ecclesiastical province or the whole episcopal conference judge to be suitable generically (without reference to any particular see) for appointment as bishops. They are required to draw up this list at least once every three years, so that it is always recent.

When it comes to a concrete appointment for a particular see, the papal representative (apostolic nuncio or delegate) asks either the outgoing bishop, or in case of a sede vacante, the vicar general or diocesan administrator, to draw up a report on its situation and the needs. That person will be the bishop who has presented his resignation or, if the see is vacant, the diocesan administrator or apostolic administrator. The papal representative is also obliged to consult the metropolitan archbishop and the other bishops of the province, the president of the bishops conference, and at least some members of the college of consultors and the cathedral chapter. He may also consult others, whether clergy, diocesan or religious, and "lay persons of outstanding wisdom".

Canon law insists on enabling those consulted to provide information and express their views confidentially, requiring that they be consulted "individually and in secret". Accordingly, when the Irish Times of 12 April 2007 published the text of the letter with which Archbishop Giuseppe Lazzarotto, Apostolic Nuncio to Ireland, consulted certain priests on the choice of their next bishop, he said, "All aspects relating to the process of episcopal appointments should be dealt with in the strictest confidentiality. I trust that you will understand that I cannot depart from this practice."

The nuncio then decides on a short list, or terna, of three candidates for further investigation and seeks precise information on each of them. Since if it were widely known that a priest who was not the one who was finally chosen for the post had been under consideration, people might think he had been excluded because of some fault found in him, the nuncio will ask those consulted about individual candidates to observe the strictest confidentiality on the fact of the consultation. He will then send to the Holy See a list of the (usually) three candidates that seem to be the most appropriate for consideration, together with all the information that has been gathered on them and accompanying the information with the conclusions that he himself draws from the evidence.

The qualities that a candidate must have are listed in canon 378 §1. As well as being at least 35 years old and a priest for at least 5 years, he should be "outstanding in strong faith, good morals, piety, zeal for souls, wisdom, prudence and human virtues", and should possess the other qualities needed for fulfilling the office in question; and he should be well versed in sacred Scripture, theology and canon law and, preferably, hold a doctorate in one of these fields. Moreover, according to ancient tradition bishops are always to be celibate and exceptions are not granted (this is not generally an issue as Roman Catholics priests are required to be celibate but it happens in personal ordinariates for former Anglicans: should a married priest be appointed an ordinary of an ordinariate he isn't consecrated bishop and rules the ordinariate as a priest).

The Dicasteries of the Roman Curia responsible for the appointment (one of the four indicated above) studies the documentation provided by the nuncio, taking into consideration his opinion, but not necessarily accepting it. It might even reject all the candidates he has proposed and ask him to prepare another list, or it might ask him to provide more information on one or more of the individuals who have already been presented. When the congregation decides on which person should be appointed, the list and the related conclusions are presented to the pope, asking him to make the appointment. If he agrees, the papal act is communicated to the nuncio for him to obtain the consent of the individual to his appointment and to choose a date for its publication. The newly appointed bishop is obliged to get episcopal consecration within three months of the arrival of the papal bull of his appointment, which is usually prepared at least a month after the publication. If the consecration takes place within the diocese, he takes charge immediately. If it occurs elsewhere, a separate act is required, after the consecration, for taking possession of his new post. Bringing the process to a conclusion requires much time, usually taking at least nine months, and it may on occasion take up to two years.

The procedure described above is the normal one for the appointment of a diocesan bishop. In the case of an auxiliary bishop, the diocesan bishop chooses the three priests to be presented for the appointment, but the nuncio still has the duty of gathering information and opinions on the candidates, and the congregation can either select one of them or ask for a different list of candidates to be presented.

In some countries, the diocesan chapter or some other body decides on the three names to send, through the nuncio, to the Holy See. With the names, the nuncio sends the information he has gathered on the candidates. If none of the three candidates is acceptable to the Holy See, the chapter is asked for another list. However, the Holy See can reject the list in its entirety and appoint someone not proposed by the chapter. In other cases the cathedral chapter chooses the bishop from among a list of three presented to them by the Holy See.

The chapter participates in the election of bishops of 13 of the 27 German dioceses (Aachen, Cologne, Essen, Freiburg, Fulda, Hildesheim, Limburg, Mainz, Münster, Osnabrück, Paderborn, Rottenburg-Stuttgart, Trier), 3 Swiss dioceses (Basel, Chur, Sankt Gallen), and 1 Austrian (Salzburg).

For the personal ordinariates established under the apostolic constitution Anglicanorum Coetibus, out of respect for the synodal tradition of Anglicanism, the ordinary will be appointed by the Roman pontiff from a terna of names presented by the governing council (CN Art. 4 § 1)

In the past, privileges regarding the appointment of bishops were granted to kings and other civil authorities. In accordance with the decision of the Second Vatican Council, the 1983 Code of Canon Law lays down that "for the future, no rights or privileges of election, appointment, presentation or designation of Bishops are conceded to civil authorities." In about a dozen countries, the civil government still has the right of consultation or even of presentation.

== Eastern Catholic Churches ==
There are 23 Eastern Catholic Churches totalling about 20 million people that are in communion with the Holy See but their liturgy and other practices are different. A patriarchal Eastern Catholic church itself elects its bishops who are to serve within its own territory, but other bishops are appointed by the pope. Before the election of a bishop, the patriarchal synod considers the names proposed by its members and draws up a list of those it considers to be valid candidates for episcopacy; this is communicated to the pope and any name for which he refuses his assent is removed from the list. When the synod then comes to elect a bishop, no further procedure is required if the person chosen is on the list; but if he is not on the list, the assent of the pope is needed before asking the newly elected to accept his election. The same arrangement holds for a Church headed by a major archbishop. In the official bulletins and news media of the Holy See, these appointments are published as decisions of the Eastern Church in question, not of the pope. The procedure for appointing bishops of other Eastern Churches and those bishops of patriarchal and major archiepiscopal Churches who are to serve outside the territory of the Church in question is similar to that for Latin bishops, and the appointments are published as acts of the pope.

== In the People's Republic of China ==
A recurring issue in the bilateral relationship between the Holy See and the People's Republic of China is the procedure for appointing bishops in mainland China. Since the 1950s, the Chinese government's position is that bishops in China should be elected by Chinese Catholics through the Chinese Catholic Patriotic Association (CCPA). The patriotic church's position is that this practice is consistent with the election of bishops in the early history of the church. The Vatican's position is that the appointment of bishops is the prerogative of the Pope. The Vatican describes the ordination of the Chinese bishops as valid but illicit.

In 2018, the Chinese government and the Holy See reached a provisional agreement on the appointment of bishops. The provisional agreement, under which the CCPA recommends bishops and the Vatican may veto the recommendations, was renewed in 2022 and 2024.

== See also ==
- Hierarchy of the Catholic Church
- Lists of patriarchs, archbishops, and bishops
