= Roman Catholic Diocese of Gibraltar =

Catholic diocese in Gibraltar

Diocese of Gibraltar Dioecesis Gibraltariensis

Catholic
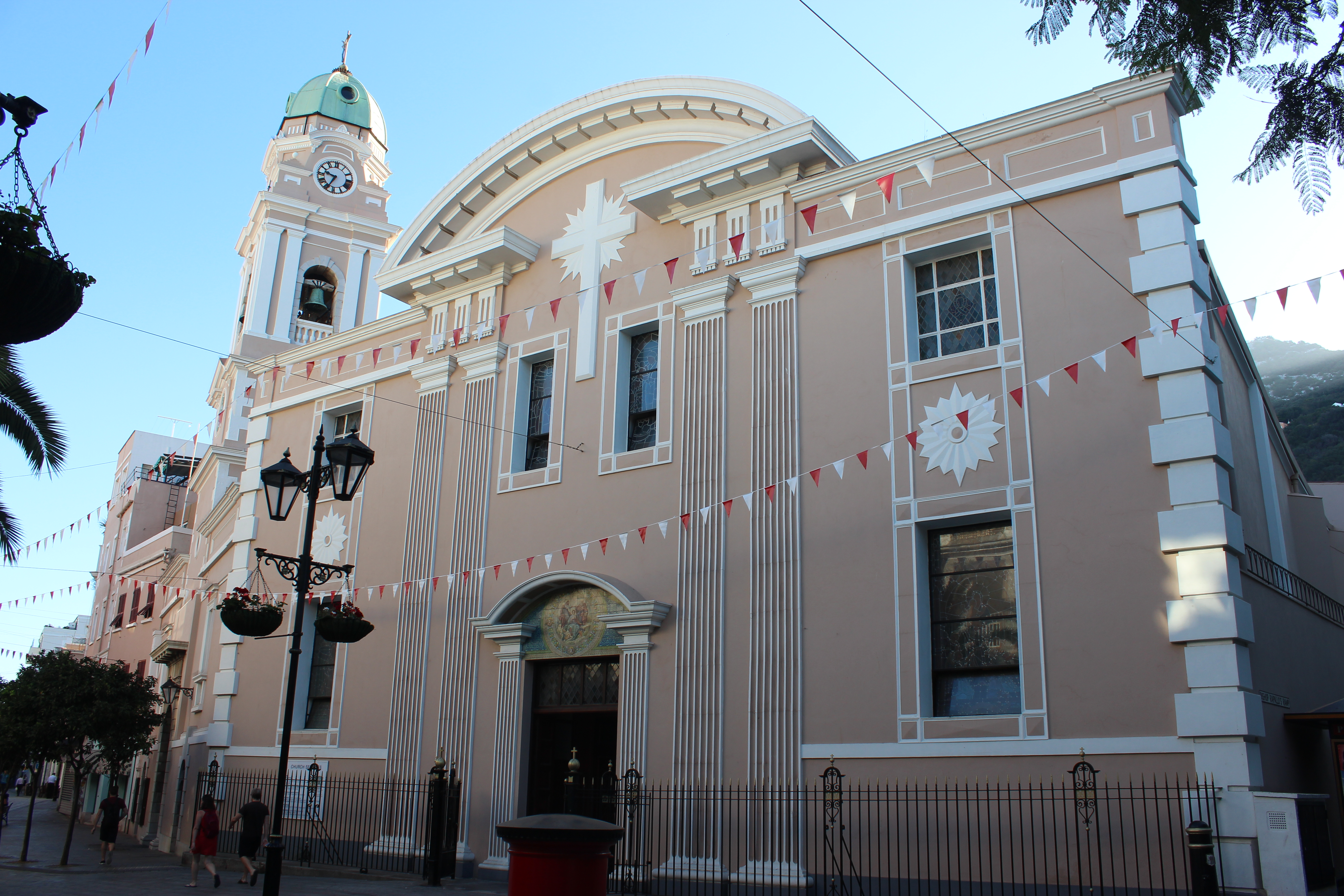
- Cathedral of St. Mary the Crowned; Main Street, Gibraltar

Location
- Country: Gibraltar
- Territory: Gibraltar
- Metropolitan: Immediately subject to the Holy See

Statistics
- Area: 6 km^{2} (2.3 sq mi)
- Population: Total; Catholics: (as of 2013); 29,431; 23,495 (79.8%)

Information
- Denomination: Roman Catholic
- Sui iuris church: Latin Church
- Rite: Roman Rite
- Established: 25 January 1816
- Cathedral: Cathedral of St. Mary the Crowned
- Patron saint: Bernard of Clairvaux; Our Lady of Europe

Current leadership
- Pope: Leo XIV
- Bishop: Charles Azzopardi
- Bishops emeritus: Carmelo Zammit

Website
- website

The Diocese of Gibraltar (Latin: Dioecesis Gibraltariensis) is a Latin Church diocese of the Catholic Church in the British overseas territory of Gibraltar. About twenty priests and nine sisters serve in the diocese. Charles Azzopardi was installed as bishop on 12 September 2025. At just over 6 square kilometers, it is among the smallest of all Catholic dioceses in the world.

The papal representative to Gibraltar since 2023 has been the Nuncio to Great Britain, Miguel Maury Buendía.

== Territory ==
The Diocese of Gibraltar comprises five parishes. In 2006 there were 15 priests, and 15 members of religious orders (10 female and 5 male). The Diocese covers the entire 6.843 square kilometres (2.642 sq mi) of Gibraltar.

== History ==
After the definite Spanish conquest of 1468, Gibraltar formed part of the diocese of Cádiz and Algeciras. It remained as such after the Habsburg conquest in 1704 (since the terms of the surrender explicitly allowed Roman Catholic worship), although the remaining Catholic population in Gibraltar was quite small. The 1713 Treaty of Utrecht did not change the status of the Catholic faith in the territory. Juan Romero de Figueroa, the Spanish priest in charge of the Parish Church of St. Mary the Crowned (who remained in the town when most of the population left the city in 1704), was the first Vicar General of the town, as appointed by the Bishop of Cádiz. However, as time passed, the British authorities prevented the Bishop of Cádiz from choosing the priests for the town, directly electing them, although the Bishop approved the appointments later. The Bishop was also prevented from making his ad limina visit to the town. Bishop Lorenzo Armengual de la Mota was the last Bishop of Cádiz to make his ad limina visit, in 1720.

The Vicariate Apostolic of Gibraltar was eventually erected in 1816, thus transferring the relationship from Cádiz to Rome. John Baptist Nosardy Zino was the first Vicar Apostolic of Gibraltar, appointed on 25 January 1816. Father Nosardy remained as Vicar until 1839, when he resigned. Since then the vicar was always a titular bishop.

The Vicariate was elevated to the status of diocese on 19 November 1910. Henry Gregory Thompson was the first Bishop of Gibraltar, until his resignation in 1927.

== See also ==
- Roman Catholicism in Gibraltar
- Roman Catholic Bishop of Gibraltar
