= List of fortifications in Gibraltar =

This is a list of fortifications of Gibraltar.

== Barracks ==
- Bombproof Barracks
- Buena Vista Barracks
- Defensible Barracks
- Grand Casemates
- Lathbury Barracks
- Retrenched Barracks
- South Barracks

== Bastions ==
- Flat Bastion (St Jago's Bastion) [Baluarte de Santiago]
- Hesse's Demi Bastion (Baluarte de San Pedro)
- Jumper's Bastion (North) [Santa Cruz]
- Jumper's Bastion (South)
- King's Bastion, 1773 (Plataforma de San Lorenzo)
- Montagu Bastion (Plataforma de San Andrés)
- North Bastion (Baluarte de San Pablo)
- Orange Bastion, 1877 (Plataforma de Santa Ana)
- South Bastion, 1540 (Baluarte de Nuestra Señora del Rosario)
- Wellington Front North Demi Bastion (Plataforma de San Diego)
- Wellington Front South Demi Bastion (Plataforma de San Francisco)

== Batteries ==
Batteries in Gibraltar
| Image | Bastion | Description | Coordinates | Spanish | Built |
|---|---|---|---|---|---|
| | Alexandra Battery | Alexandra Battery is an artillery battery in the British Overseas Territory of Gibraltar. | | | |
| | Breakneck Battery | Breakneck Battery is an artillery battery located on Ministry of Defence property at the Upper Rock Nature Reserve, north of Lord Airey's Battery. It is one of a dozen batteries in Gibraltar that had 9.2-inch guns installed around the turn of the 20th century. | 36.128373°N 5.34425°W | | |
| | Bomb Proof Battery | Bomb Proof Battery was an artillery battery in the British Overseas Territory of Gibraltar. | | | |
| | Buena Vista Battery | Buena Vista Battery are two preserved artillery batteries in Gibraltar. | | | |
| | Buffadero Battery | Buffadero Battery was an artillery battery in the British Overseas Territory of Gibraltar. | | | |
| | Calpe Battery | Calpe Battery was an artillery battery in the British Overseas Territory of Gibraltar. | | | |
| | Castle Batteries | Castle Batteries are a group of six abandoned artillery batteries in the British Overseas Territory of Gibraltar. | | | |
| | Caves Battery | The Caves Battery was on the east side of Gibraltar during WWII. | | | |
| | Catalan Batteries | The Catalan Batteries are a pair of artillery batteries in the British Overseas Territory of Gibraltar below Breakneck Battery. | | | |
| | Civil Hospital Battery | Civil Hospital Battery is an artillery battery in the British Overseas Territory of Gibraltar. | | | |
| | Couvreport Battery | Couvreport Battery is an artillery battery in the British Overseas Territory of Gibraltar. | | | |
| | Crutchett's Batteries | Crutchett's Batteries is a group of artillery batteries in the British Overseas Territory of Gibraltar. | | | |
| | Cumberland Flank Battery | Cumberland Flank Battery was an artillery battery in the British Overseas Territory of Gibraltar. | | | |
| | Detached Mole Battery | Detached Mole Battery was an artillery battery in the British Overseas Territory of Gibraltar. | | | |
| | Devil's Bowling Green Battery | Devil's Bowling Green Battery is an artillery battery in the British Overseas Territory of Gibraltar. | | | |
| | Devil's Gap Battery | Devil's Gap Battery is an artillery battery in the British Overseas Territory of Gibraltar. | | es:Punta del Diablo | |
| | Devil's Tongue Battery | Devil's Tongue Battery was an artillery battery in the British Overseas Territory of Gibraltar. | | | |
| | Edward VII Battery | Edward VII Battery was an artillery battery in the British Overseas Territory of Gibraltar. | | | |
| | Eight Gun Battery | Eight Gun Battery was a Spanish artillery battery on Gibraltar. | | | |
| | Eliott's Battery | Eliott's Battery was an artillery battery on Gibraltar. | | | |
| | Eliott's Practice Battery | Eliott's Practice Battery was an artillery battery on Gibraltar. | | | |

- Engineer Battery
- Europa Advance Batteries
- Europa Batteries
- Europa Pass Batteries
- Farringdon's Battery
- Forbes' Batteries
- Gardiner's Battery
- Genista Battery
- Genoese Batteries
- Governor's Lookout Battery
- Grand Battery (Muralla de San Bernardo)
- Green's Lodge Battery
- Half Way Battery
- Hanover Battery
- Harding's Battery
- Hayne's Cave Battery
- Hutment Battery
- Jews' Cemetery Battery
- Jones' Battery
- King's Lines Battery
- Lady Augusta's Battery
- Lady Louisa's Battery
- Levant Battery
- Lewis' Battery
- Lighthouse Battery
- Little Bay Battery
- Lord Airey's Battery
- Martin's Battery (or Mediterranean Battery)
- Middle Hill Battery
- Mount Misery Battery
- Napier of Magdala Battery
- New Mole Battery
- North Mole Elbow Battery
- Oil Tanks Battery
- O'Hara's Battery
- Orillon Battery
- Parson's Lodge Battery
- Prince Ferdinand's Battery
- Prince George's Battery
- Prince of Wales Batteries
- Prince William's Battery
- Princess Amelia's Battery
- Princess Anne's Battery (Willis's Battery) [San Joaquin, San Jose]
- Princess Caroline's Battery
- Princess Charlotte's Battery
- Princess Royal's Battery (Queen Anne's/Queen's Battery)
- Queen's Battery
- Queen Charlotte's Battery
- Raglan's Battery
- Reclamation Battery
- Rock Gun Battery
- Rooke Battery
- Rosia Batteries
- Saluting Battery
- Scud Hill Battery
- Signal Hill Battery
- Sir Herbert Miles Promenade (Columbine Battery)
- South Batteries
- Spur Battery
- Spyglass Battery
- St. George's Battery
- Tovey Battery
- Tower Battery
- Upper Battery
- Victoria Battery
- Waterport Battery
- West Battery
- White Rock Battery
- Willis' Battery
- Windmill Hill Batteries
- Woodford's Battery
- Zoca Flank Battery, 1879

== Castles ==
- Moorish Castle

== Curtain walls ==
- Charles V Wall
- Line Wall Curtain
- Montagu Curtain
- Moorish Wall
- Wellington Front

== Ditches ==
- Landport Ditch
- Southport Ditch

== Gates ==
- Algeciras Gate
- Barcina Gate
- Granada Gate
- Grand Casemates Gates (Water Gate) Puerta de la Mar
- Landport (Puerta de Tierra/España)
- Prince Edward's Gate (Puerta de África)
- Queen's Gate
- Ragged Staff Gates
- Southport Gates, 1552 (Puerta de Carlos V)

== Magazines ==
- Eliott's Magazine
- Europa Sunken Magazine
- Flat Bastion Magazine
- Grand Magazine
- Willis' Magazine
- Ragged Staff Magazine

== Moles ==
- Detached Mole
- North Mole
- South Mole
- Rosia Mole

== Tunnels ==
- Admiralty Tunnel
- Great North Road
- Great Siege Tunnels (Upper Galleries)
- Landport Tunnel
- William's Way
- Windsor Gallery

== Watchtowers ==
- Devil's Tower
- Giralda Tower
- O'Hara's Tower (O'Hara's Folly, where O'Hara's Battery now stands)
- Stanley's Clock Tower
- Tower of Homage
- Tuerto Tower
- Remains of a medieval tower (Remnant visible in an underground garage in Line Wall Road)

== Other ==
- Caledonian Canal
- Chatham Counterguard, 1823
- Flêche
- Forbes' Barrier
- Glacis
- Healy's Mortar
- Inundation
- King's Lines
- Montagu Counterguard
- Old Mole
- Ragged Staff Flank
- New Mole (South Mole)
- Prince Albert's Front, 1842
- Prince's Lines
- Queen's Lines
- Salto del Lobo (Peregil)
- West Place of Arms
