= King's Lines =

Line of fortifications in Gibraltar

- Part of Fortifications of Gibraltar
- Gibraltar
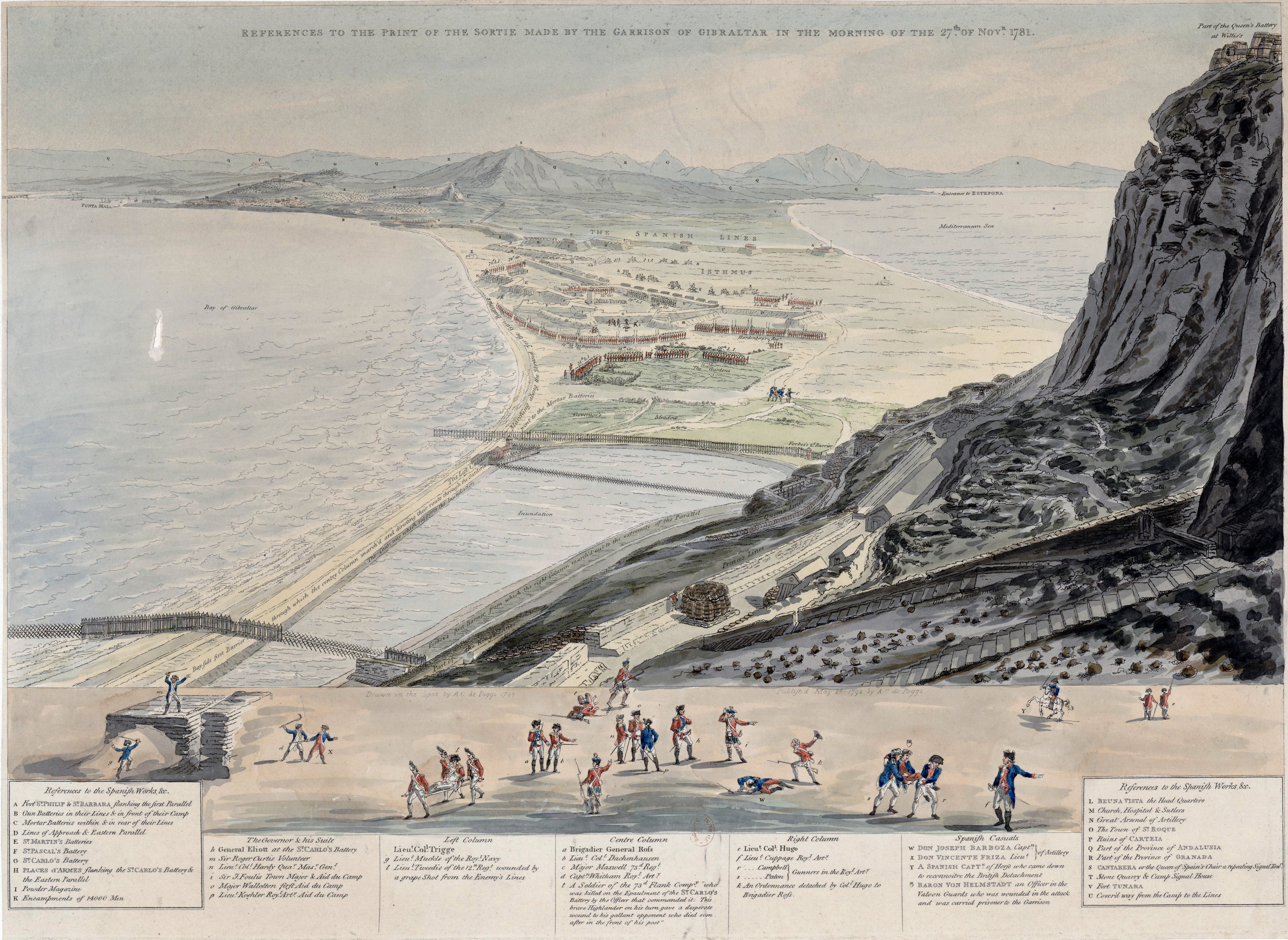
- View of the King's Lines and the Isthmus in 1783

Site information
- Type: Fortified defensive lines
- Owner: Government of Gibraltar
- Condition: Abandoned

Location
- Location of the King's Lines in Gibraltar
- Location within Gibraltar
- Coordinates: 36.145571°N 5.34957°W

The King's Lines are a walled rock-cut trench on the lower slopes of the north-west face of the Rock of Gibraltar. Forming part of the Northern Defences of the fortifications of Gibraltar, they were originally created some time during the periods when Gibraltar was under the control of the Moors or Spanish. They are depicted in a 1627 map by Don Luis Bravo de Acuña, which shows their parapet following a tenaille trace. The lines seem to have been altered subsequently, as maps from the start of the 18th century show a more erratic course leading from the Landport, Gibraltar's main land entrance, to the Round Tower, a fortification at their western end. A 1704 map by Johannes Kip calls the Lines the "Communication Line of the Round Tower".

In 1704, an Anglo-Dutch force captured Gibraltar in the name of Charles, Archduke of Austria who claimed the crown of Spain during the War of the Spanish Succession. The Lines were named after him. They saw use during the Twelfth Siege of Gibraltar (1704–5), when the Spanish and their French allies succeeded in breaching the defences but were repelled; during the Thirteenth Siege (1727), when they were bombarded by the Spanish; and during the Great Siege (1779–83), when they were again under Spanish bombardment. During the tenure of William Green as Gibraltar's Senior Engineer from 1761 to 1783, the Lines were repaired, improved and fortified, and the cliffs below were scarped to make them impossible to climb. Facing west towards the Bay of Gibraltar, they were intended to make it possible to enfilade any attacking force trying to reach the gates of Gibraltar; they are connected to the Queen's Lines via a communication gallery completed on 13 September 1782.

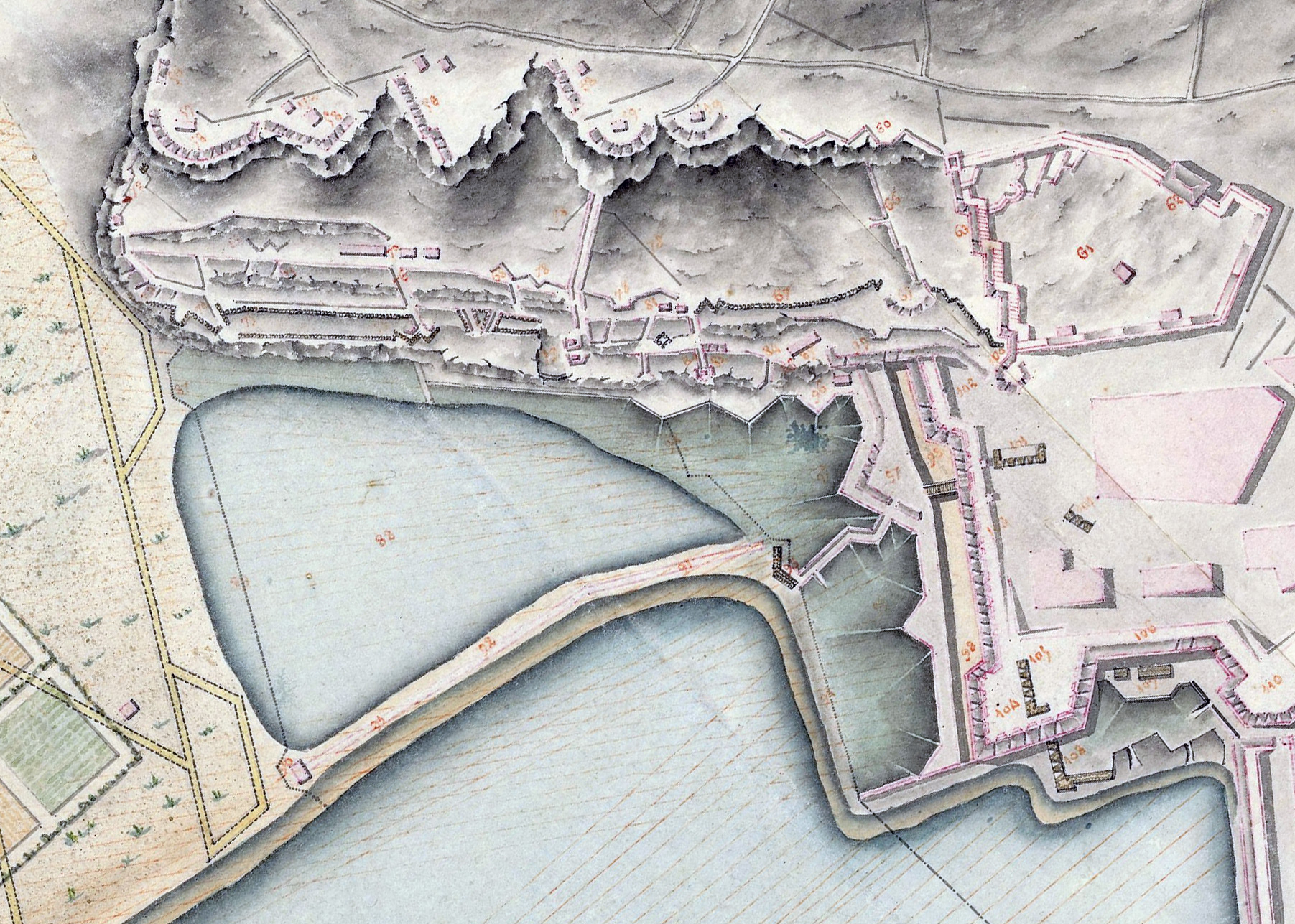
Clickable map of the Northern Defences of Gibraltar in 1810 (north is to the left)

Following the Great Siege, the British bored a tunnel called the Hanover Gallery to connect the King's Lines to the Landport near No. 3 Castle Battery. A communication trench was also dug to the nearby Prince's Lines. Behind the King's Lines, the British dug a tunnel, called the King's Gallery, which ran parallel with the Lines to link them to the Queen's Lines and could be used as a bombproof shelter.

Together with the Landport Front defences, the three sets of Lines constituted such a formidable obstacle that the Spanish called the landward approach to Gibraltar el boca de fuego, the "mouth of fire". A British clergyman, William Robertson, recorded his impressions of the Lines from his visit there in 1841:

The lower lines consist of two lines of excavations, one above the other, communicating by subterranean passages and stairs. They are much shorter than the upper lines, and as excavations less remarkable, but as batteries they are far more formidable, and are considered exquisite specimens of fortification. The batteries here are not subterranean, like this in the upper lines, but stand out from the face of the rock; but the communications are chiefly excavated through the rock, in which there is also hollowed out a spacious hall for a mess-room, and, in fact, a complete barrack for the soldiers.

The King's Lines were used as an artillery platform for over 200 years. During the Anglo-Spanish War of 1762–3, five 9-pdrs and one 6-pdr were recorded as being mounted on the Lines. Two 14-gun positions were established on the Lines for the Great Siege, at a point which was called either King's Battery or Black Battery. During World War II the Lines were redeveloped with a second wall built behind the parapet and the resulting space roofed over, to provide positions for machine guns and Hotchkiss anti-tank guns.

King's Lines
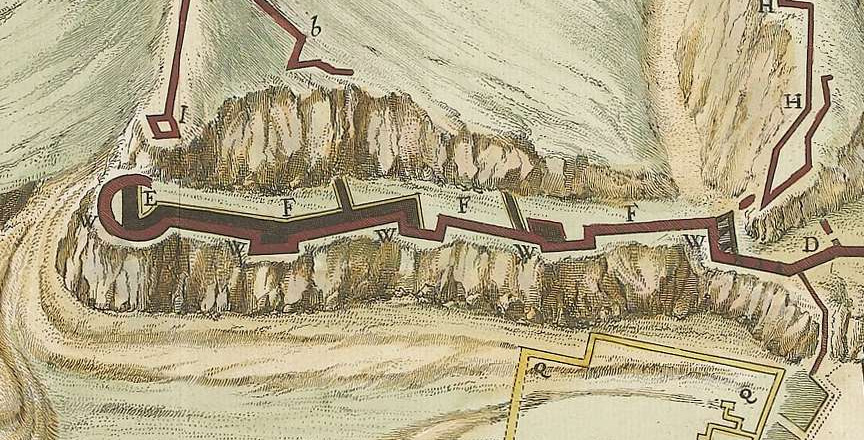
The Communication Line of the Round Tower, 1704

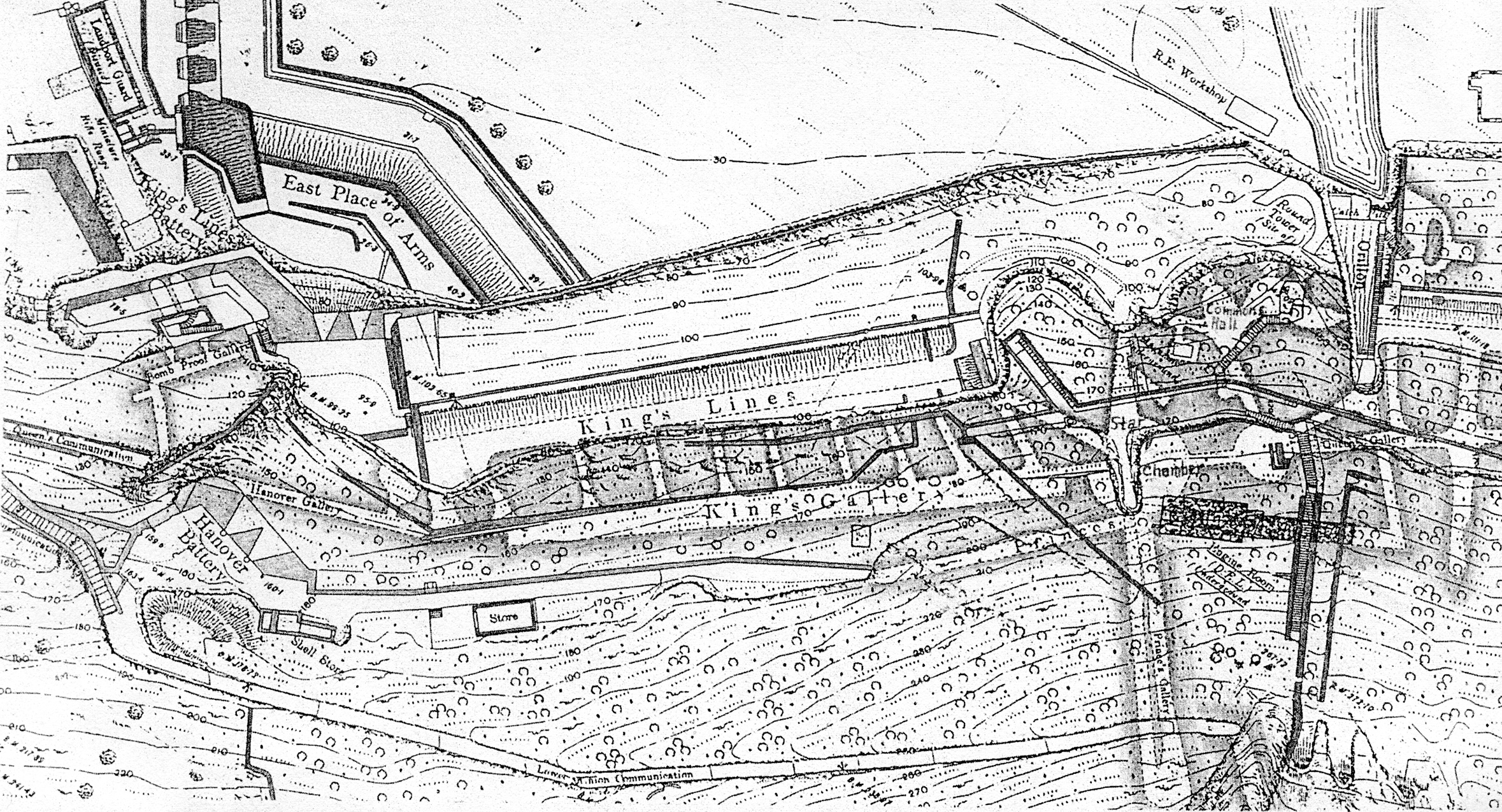
1908 Ordnance Survey map of the King's Lines

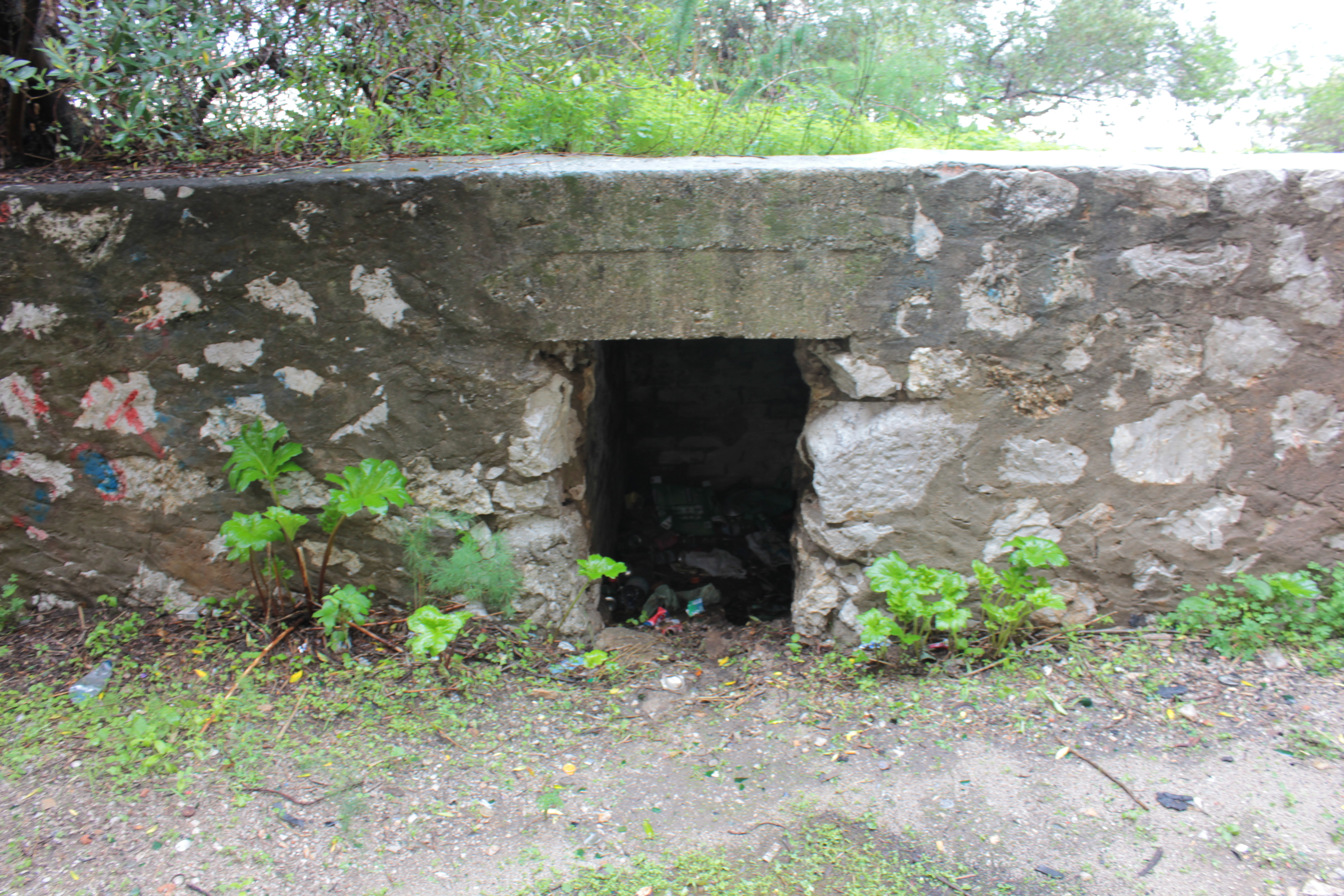
Second World War casemated trench in the King's Lines

The Lines are now abandoned, overgrown and not officially open to the public, although they have been described as "not merely one of the most, [but] perhaps the most, hauntingly vivid experiences of a visit to Gibraltar . . . [standing] comparison with some of the most famous military sites in the world." As John Harris of the Royal Institute of British Architects has put it, they are "capable of providing one of the great architectural experiences in the western world . . . the atmosphere of the Great Siege is vivid and evocative in the extreme." The Gibraltar Conservation Society proposed a £500,000 scheme in the early 1980s to preserve and reopen the Lines and the surrounding batteries, galleries and bombproof magazines, but the scheme did not go ahead and the Lines have continued to be neglected and vandalised despite being scheduled as an Ancient Monument. It is possible to visit the King's Lines with guided tours, the area has been cleaned up and prepared for this.

== Bibliography ==
- Allan, George (1982). "Safeguards for Gibraltar's Heritage". Save Gibraltar's Heritage. London: Save Britain's Heritage. ISBN 0-905978-13-7.
- Binney, Marcus; Martin, Kit (1982). "Tourism, Conservation and Development". Save Gibraltar's Heritage. London: Save Britain's Heritage. ISBN 0-905978-13-7.
- Fa, Darren; Finlayson, Clive (2006). The Fortifications of Gibraltar. Oxford: Osprey Publishing. ISBN 1-84603-016-1.
- Hughes, Quentin; Migos, Athanassios (1995). Strong as the Rock of Gibraltar. Gibraltar: Exchange Publications. OCLC 48491998.
- Kenyon, Edward Ranulph (1938). Gibraltar Under Moor, Spaniard, and Briton. London: Methuen.
- Kip, Johannes (1704). An exact Plan of the town, castle, moles and bay of Gibraltar. London: Edward Castle.
- Robertson, William (1845). Journal of a clergyman during a visit to the Peninsula in the summer and autumn of 1841. London: W. Blackwood & Sons.
