= Ragged Staff Flank =

Ragged Staff Flank is a masonry fortification on the South Front of Gibraltar's fortifications. It continues the line of the South Bastion's seaward face across the South Front ditch, then turns to form a flanking position facing south along the coastal fortifications leading to the New Mole. The Ragged Staff Gates were situated in the middle of the flank, leading to the Ordnance Wharf that was located where the Dockyard North Gate used to stand. A defended enclosure stood behind the gate, secured by the Ragged Staff Guardhouse. The flank position had three embrasures in its parapet but only mounted two 24-pdr guns in 1779, though these were replaced by 32-pdrs under the rearmament plan of 1859.

== Bibliography ==
- Hughes, Quentin; Migos, Athanassios (1995). Strong as the Rock of Gibraltar. Gibraltar: Exchange Publications. OCLC 48491998.

36°08′02″N 5°21′14″W
