= Inundation (disambiguation) =

Inundation is a term for Flooding.

Inundation may also refer to:

- Flooding of the Nile, regularly referred to as "the Inundation"
- Inundation, Gibraltar, flooded and fortified area of ground between Spain and Gibraltar
- Inundation of the Wieringermeer
- Season of the Inundation first season of the lunar and civil Egyptian calendars
- The Inundation of the Lost Villages in Ontario during the construction of the St. Lawrence Seaway
