= West Battery =

Artillery battery in Gibraltar

- Part of Fortifications of Gibraltar
- Gibraltar

Site information
- Type: Artillery battery
- Owner: Ministry of Defence

Location
- Location in Gibraltar
- Coordinates: 36.1136°N 5.347°W

West Battery is an artillery battery in the British Overseas Territory of Gibraltar. It is situated on the escarpment of Windmill Hill in the south of the territory.

The battery stands on the site of two emplacements originally constructed under General Edward Cornwallis between 1762 and 1777. It takes its name from its position facing south-west. In the late 19th century it became (along with Buffadero Battery and Jews' Cemetery Battery) one of three batteries on or below Windmill Hill to be equipped with BL 9.2 inch gun Mk V guns, two of which were installed in 1886. These were upgraded to BL 9.2 inch gun Mk X guns in 1901, mounted on Mark V barbettes. They faced out towards the Mediterranean to cover naval traffic through the Straits of Gibraltar.

The 9.2-inch guns remained in service until 1950. They were subsequently replaced by three 5.25-inch dual-purpose guns for coastal and anti-aircraft defence. Although the guns have since been removed, the emplacements and the structure of the battery are still clearly visible.
