= Queen's Lines =

- Part of Fortifications of Gibraltar
- Gibraltar
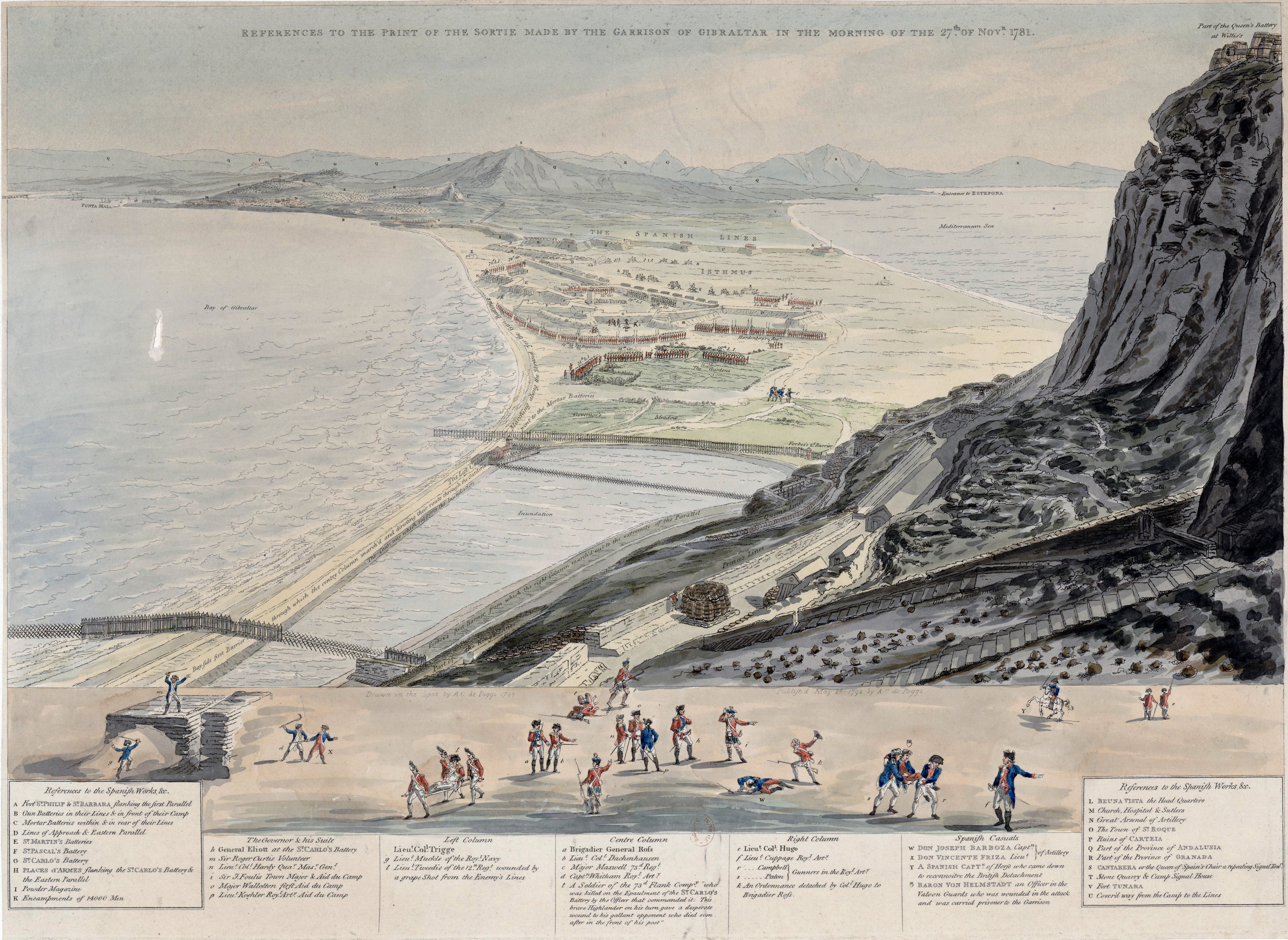
- 1908 Ordnance Survey map of the Queen's Lines and Prince's Lines

Site information
- Type: Fortified defensive lines
- Owner: Government of Gibraltar
- Condition: Abandoned

Location
- Location of the Queen's Lines in Gibraltar
- Coordinates: 36.146703°N 5.347647°W

The Queen's Lines are a set of fortified lines, part of the fortifications of Gibraltar, situated on the lower slopes of the north-west face of the Rock of Gibraltar. They occupy a natural ledge which overlooks the landward entrance to Gibraltar and were an extension to the north-east of the King's Lines. They run from a natural fault called the Orillon to a cliff above the modern Laguna Estate, which stands on the site of the Inundation, an artificial lake created to obstruct landward access to Gibraltar. The Prince's Lines run immediately behind and above them on a higher ledge. All three of the Lines were constructed to enfilade attackers approaching Gibraltar's Landport Front from the landward direction.

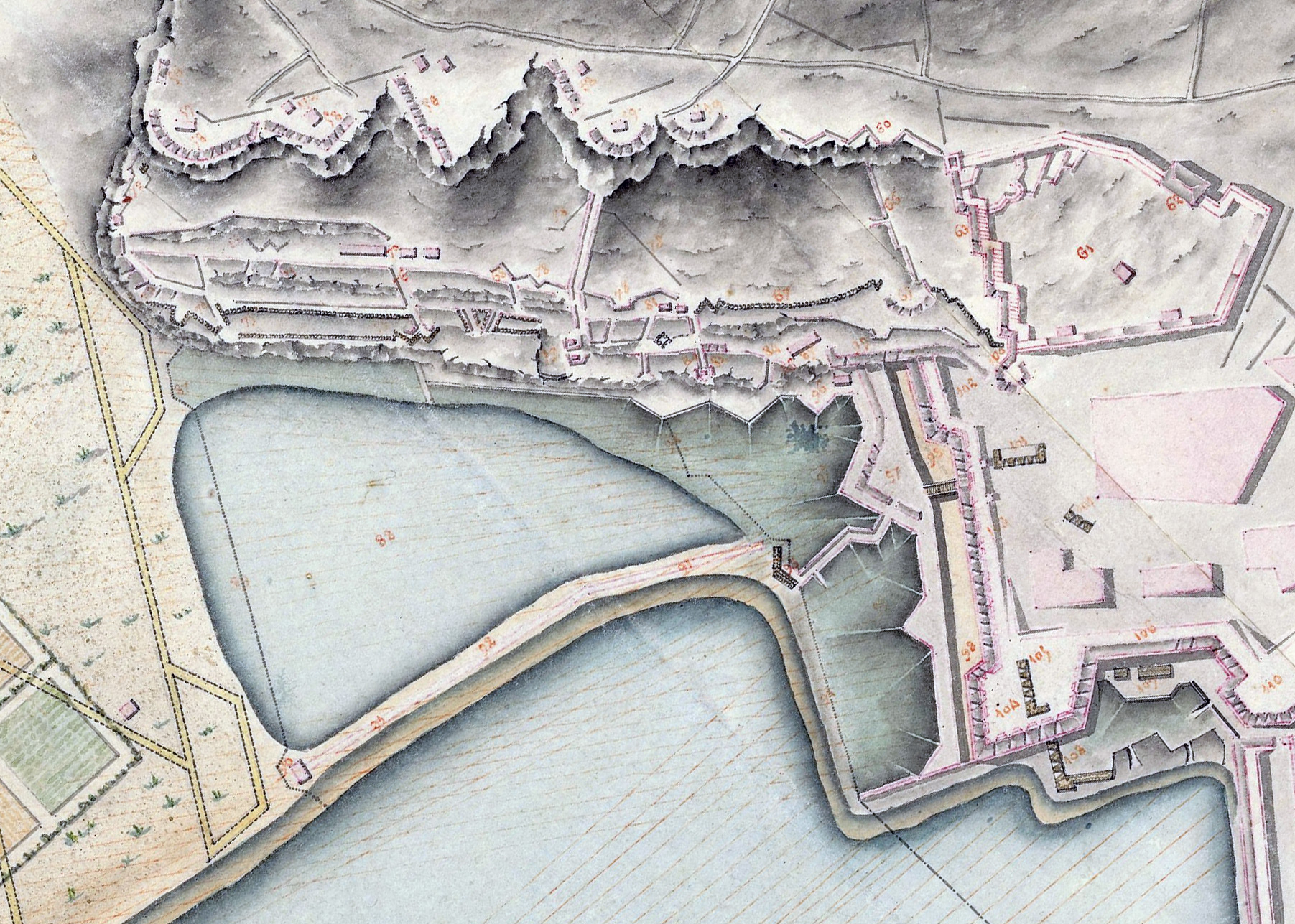
Clickable map of the Northern Defences of Gibraltar in 1810 (north is to the left)

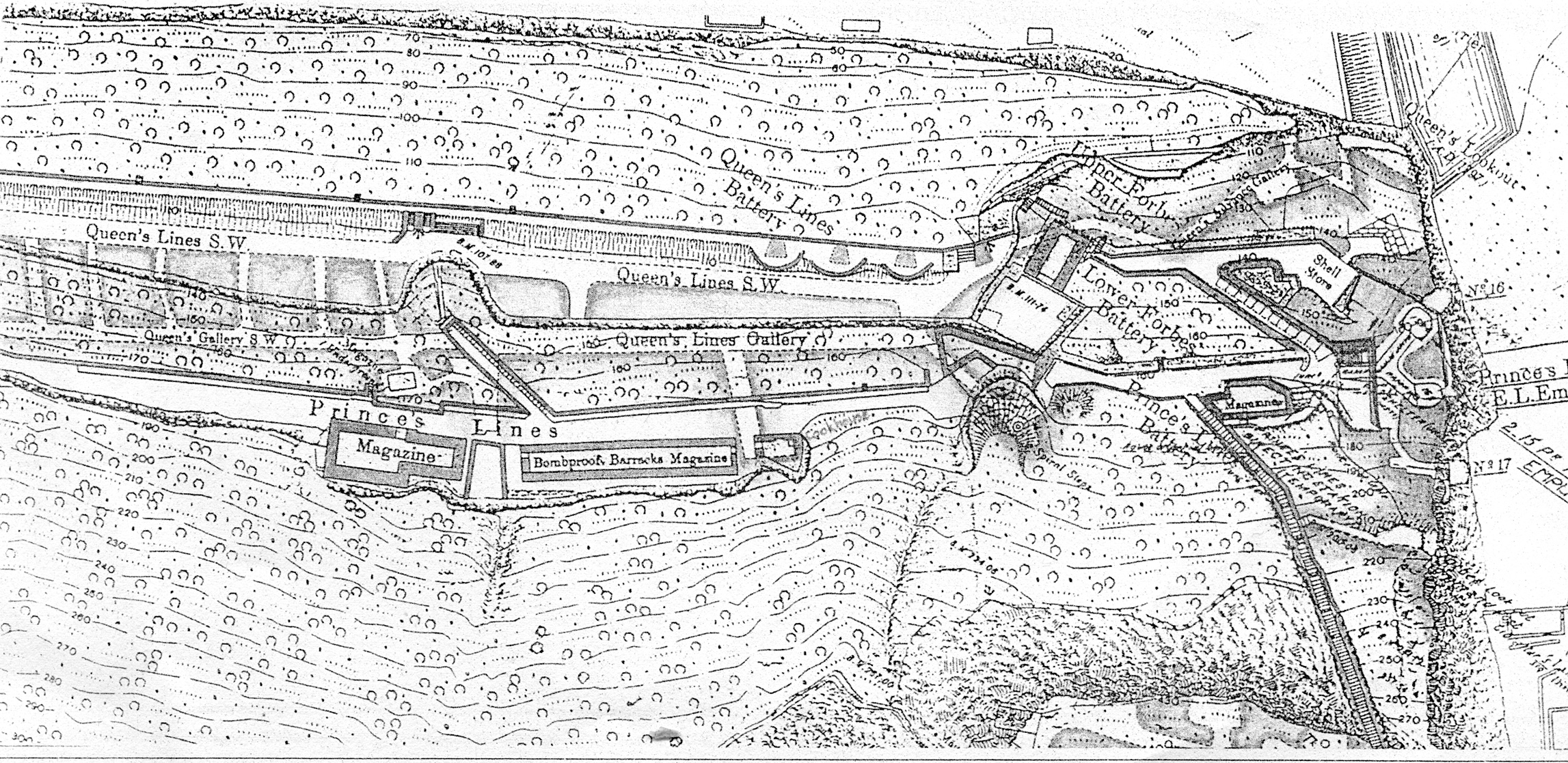
1908 Ordnance Survey map of the Queen's Lines and Prince's Lines

The Lines were built in 1788 but the Spanish or Moors seem to have constructed a much earlier irregular defensive wall on the same site, as depicted in a 1627 map by Don Luis Bravo de Acuña. The Lines run along what had been an access path up to the Granada Gate. During the tenure of William Green as Gibraltar's Senior Engineer from 1761 to 1783, the Lines were repaired, improved and fortified, and the cliffs below were scarped to make them impossible to climb.

They are connected to the King's Lines via a communication gallery completed on 13 September 1782, and to the Prince's Lines via another gallery constructed in 1790. They saw action during the Great Siege of Gibraltar (1779–83) when the Lines were a principal target for Spanish gun batteries; during a heavy bombardment in September 1782, they suffered significant damage.

At the far end of the Queen's Lines is the Queen's Lines Battery, which mounted one 12-pdr between 1781 and 1834. The gun was then replaced by an 8-inch brass howitzer, and between 1859 and 1889 a ten-inch howitzer and three 24-pdr carronades were mounted there. Behind the Lines three tunnels called the Queen's Lines Galleries were dug out in 1789 to provide bomb-proof shelters. At the eastern end of the Lines, Queen's Advance and Queen's Lookout (built in 1727) provide views out over the isthmus between Gibraltar and Spain.

== Bibliography ==
- Cornwell, B. (1782). A Description of Gibraltar: with an account of the blockade, siege, the attempt by nine sail of fire ships, the sally made from the garrison, and every thing remarkable or worthy notice that has occurred in that place since the commencement of the Spanish war. London: B. Cornwell.
- Drinkwater, John (1786). A history of the late siege of Gibraltar. London. OCLC 631054.
- Fa, Darren; Finlayson, Clive (2006). The Fortifications of Gibraltar. Oxford: Osprey Publishing. ISBN 1-84603-016-1.
- Hughes, Quentin; Migos, Athanassios (1995). Strong as the Rock of Gibraltar. Gibraltar: Exchange Publications. OCLC 48491998.
- Kenyon, Edward Ranulph (1938). Gibraltar Under Moor, Spaniard, and Briton. London: Methuen.
