= Hesse's Demi Bastion =

- Part of Fortifications of Gibraltar
- Landport, Gibraltar
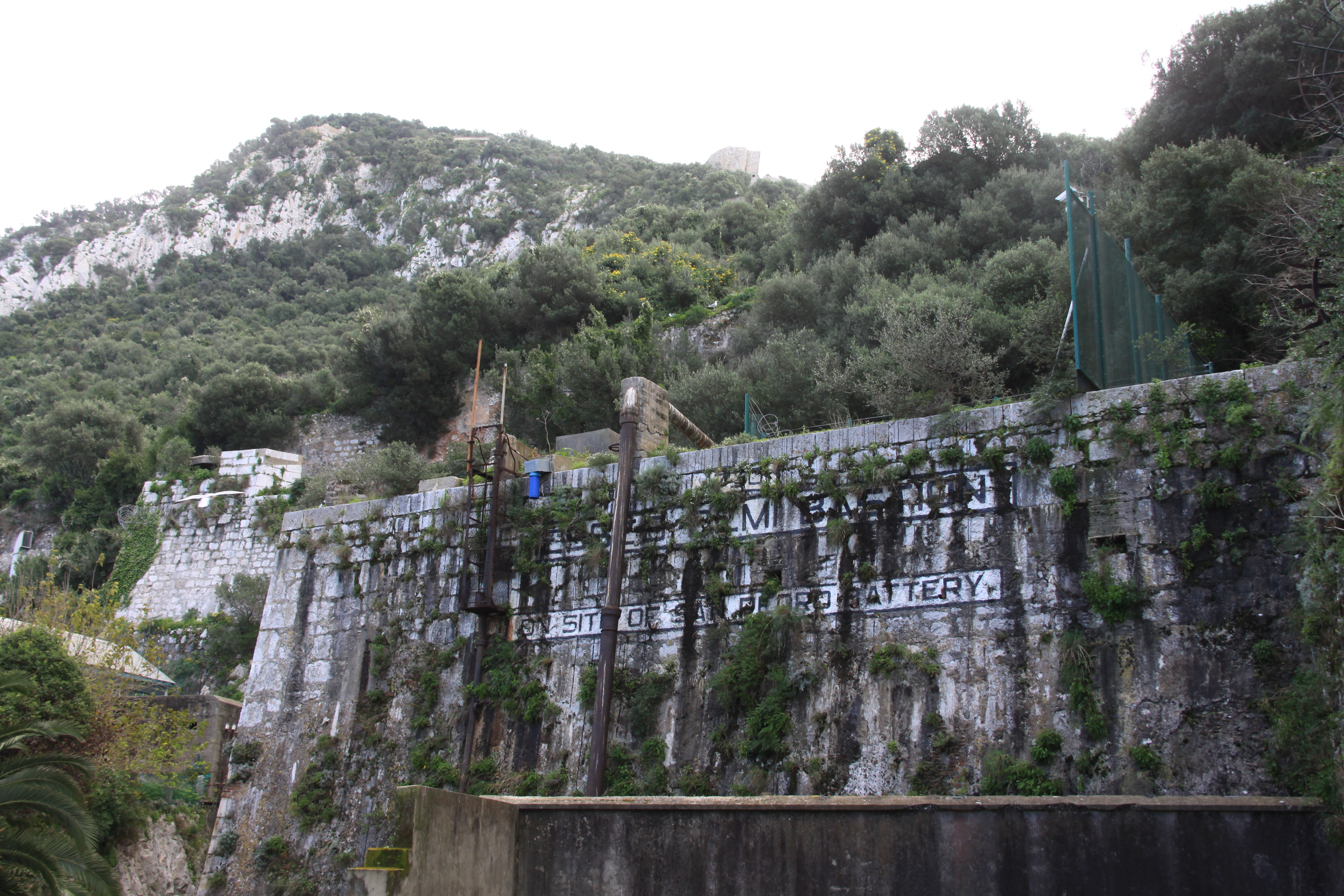
- Hesse's Demi Bastion as seen from Landport.

Site information
- Type: Demi-bastion
- Owner: Government of Gibraltar

Hesse's Demi Bastion is a demi-bastion in the British Overseas Territory of Gibraltar. It is part of the Northern Defences of Gibraltar. The bastion forms a link in a chain of fortifications which ascend the lower north-west slopes of the Rock of Gibraltar, below the King's Lines Battery and Bombproof Battery. The Moorish Castle's Tower of Homage is at the top of the same incline.

== History ==
It was originally the Baluado de S. Pedro (St. Peter's Bastion) during the Spanish period prior to the Capture of Gibraltar in 1704 under Prince George of Hesse-Darmstadt, after whom the bastion is named. The old Spanish bastion was rebuilt and renamed by the British in 1730. In 1762, during the Seven Years' War, it was armed with two 18-pdrs and four 4-pdrs to flank the ditch in front of the Landport Gate. By 1885 the bastion's guns were all 32-pdrs.
