= Genoese Batteries =

Artillery batteries in Gibraltar

- Part of Fortifications of Gibraltar
- Gibraltar

Site information
- Type: Artillery batteries
- Owner: Government of Gibraltar

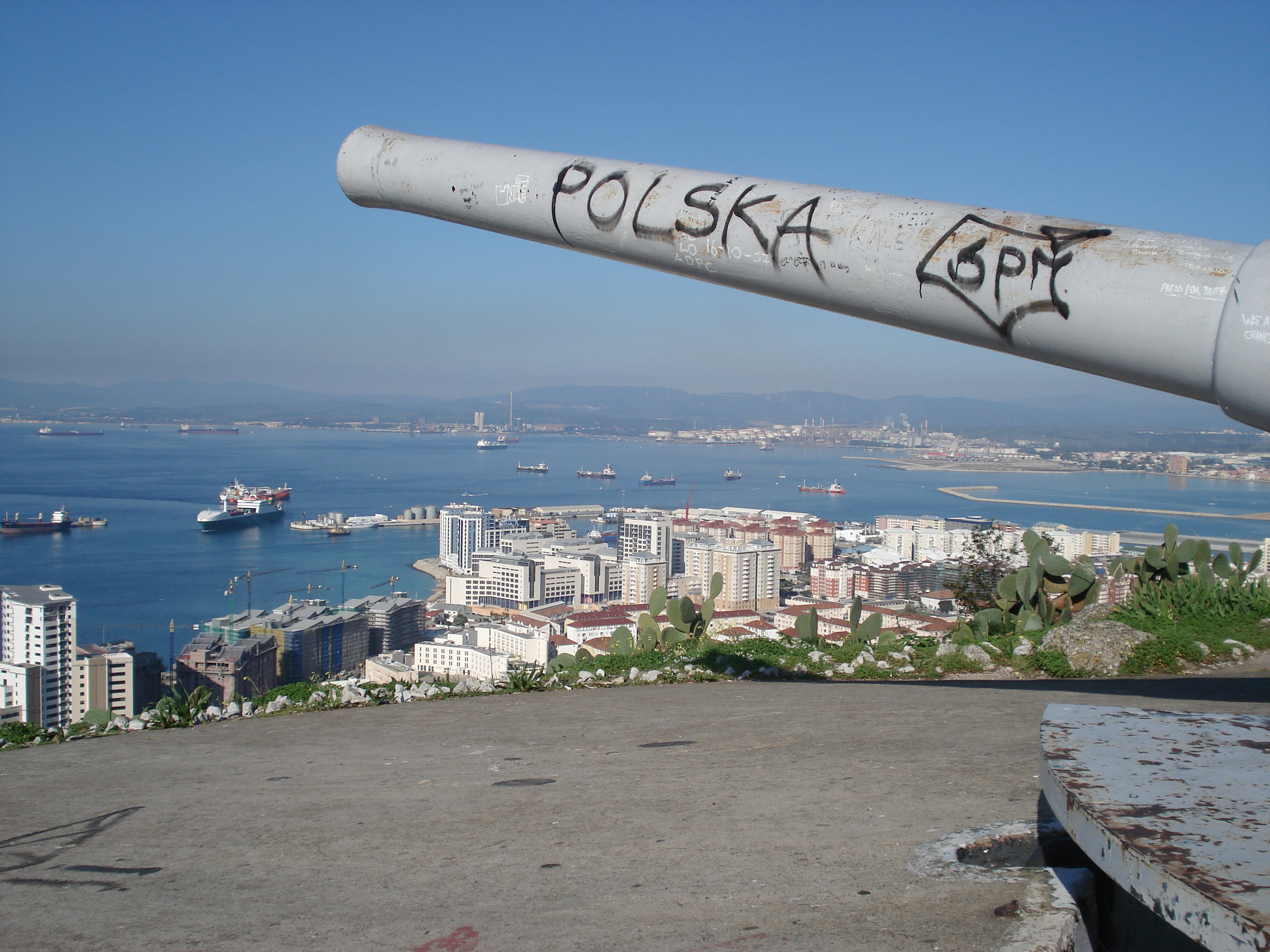
Parrot Monument

Genoese Batteries are a pair of artillery batteries in the British Overseas Territory of Gibraltar. The Upper and Lower Genoese Batteries defended the south front of Gibraltar together with the Flat Bastion, South Bastion, Prince Ferdinand's Battery and Healy's Mortar. They were originally built by the Moors or Spanish but added to by the British in the 18th century.

The Upper Genoese Battery was originally known as the Reduto de San Agustin.

Upper Genoese Battery
- Part of Fortifications of Gibraltar
- Gibraltar

Site information
- Type: Artillery battery
- Owner: Government of Gibraltar

Location
- Location in Gibraltar
- Coordinates: 36.134955°N 5.349929°W

The Lower Genoese Battery was called the Reduto de San Philipe.
