= South Batteries =

Artillery battery in Gibraltar

- Part of Fortifications of Gibraltar
- Gibraltar

Site information
- Type: Artillery battery
- Owner: Ministry of Defence

Location
- Location in Gibraltar
- Coordinates: 36.11305°N 5.3447°W

South Batteries is an artillery battery in the British Overseas Territory of Gibraltar.

== Description ==
The South Battery had four 3.7 inch guns during World War II. It was just south west of Buffadero Battery at the southern end of the Rock of Gibraltar. The battery was directed from the "Gun Operation Room" which was hidden and protected underground with tunnels leading to Lathbury Barracks and to the north end of the rock via a number of tunnels including the Great North Road.
