= Queen's Gate, Gibraltar =

Queen's Gate
- Part of Fortifications of Gibraltar
- Gibraltar
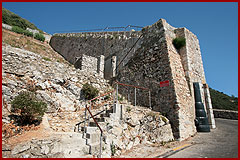
- The Queen's Gate in 2012

Site information
- Type: City gate
- Owner: Government of Gibraltar

Location
- Location in Gibraltar
- Coordinates: 36.132102°N 5.348658°W

Site history
- Built: 1790

Queen's Gate is a city gate in the British Overseas Territory of Gibraltar. A large population of Barbary macaques reside in this area, making it a major tourist attraction. Most of the macaques sleep within an area of 9 hectares (22 acres) around the Queen's Gate.

The gate was created by breaching the Charles V Wall in about 1790. The wall itself is much older and was constructed in 1540 at the command of Philip II of Spain. The gate is just above Prince Ferdinand's Battery, now known as Ape's Den. Inglis Way, one of the walks within the Upper Rock Nature Reserve, starts at this gate.

During World War II Queen's Gate Battery was the site of two 6-inch guns. These guns could fire over 6,000 yards (5,500 m).
