= Lewis' Battery =

Artillery battery in Gibraltar

- Part of Fortifications of Gibraltar
- Gibraltar

Site information
- Type: Artillery battery
- Owner: HM Government of Gibraltar
- Controlled by: Department of the Environment
- Open to the public: No
- Condition: Derelict

Location
- Location in Gibraltar
- Coordinates: 36.1408415°N 5.3489892°W

Lewis' Battery was an artillery battery in the British Overseas Territory of Gibraltar.

== Description ==
During World War II Lewis Battery was the site of two 6 inch guns on the Rock of Gibraltar. These guns could fire over 6,000 yards.
