= St. George's Battery =

Artillery battery in Gibraltar

- Part of Fortifications of Gibraltar
- Gibraltar

Site information
- Type: Artillery battery
- Owner: Ministry of Defence

St. George's Battery is an artillery battery in the British Overseas Territory of Gibraltar.
