= Algeciras Gate =

- Part of Fortifications of Gibraltar
- Gibraltar

Site information
- Type: Gate
- Owner: Government of Gibraltar

Location
- Location in Gibraltar
- Location within Gibraltar
- Coordinates: 36.139707°N 5.354849°W

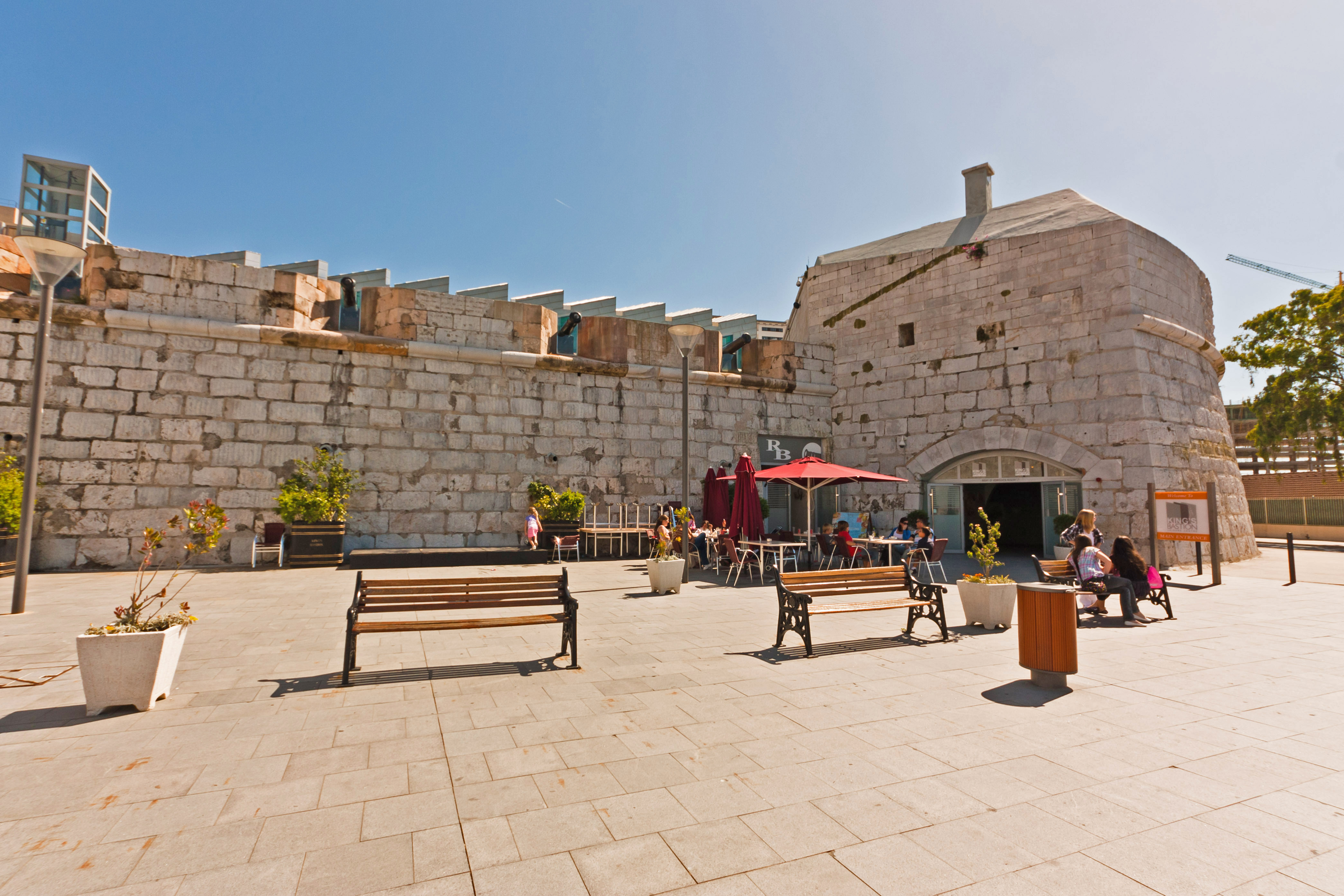
King’s Bastion now stands in the former location of Algeciras Gate which was destroyed during its construction.

Algeciras Gate was a city gate in the British Overseas Territory of Gibraltar. It was located on the site of what later became King's Bastion and was removed during construction of the bastion by the Spanish in 1575. The Algeciras Gate was Moorish in style and adorned with detail, including motifs of keys.
