= Inundation, Gibraltar =

Inundation
- La Laguna
- Part of Fortifications of Gibraltar
- Gibraltar
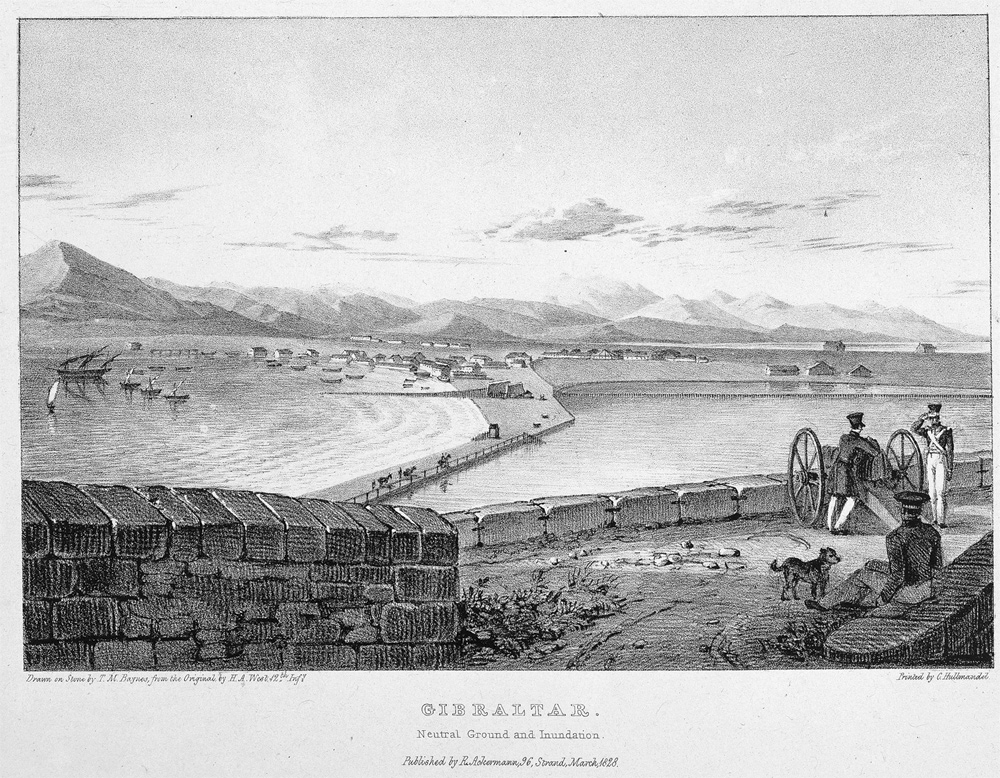
- View over the Neutral Ground and Inundation from British positions on the Rock of Gibraltar, depicted in 1828

Site information
- Type: Body of water
- Owner: Government of Gibraltar
- Open to the public: Yes
- Condition: Drained and reclaimed

Location
- Location of the Inundation in Gibraltar
- Coordinates: 36.147258°N 5.349093°W

Site history
- Built: 1735
- Demolished: Post World War II

The Inundation was a flooded and fortified area of ground on the sandy isthmus between Spain and Gibraltar, created by the British in the 18th century to restrict access to the territory as part of the fortifications of Gibraltar. It was originally a marshy area known as the Morass at the far south-western end of the isthmus, occupying the area adjacent to the north-western flank of the Rock of Gibraltar. The Morass was dug out and expanded to create an artificial lake which was further obstructed by iron and wooden obstacles in the water. Two small fortifications on either side controlled access to Gibraltar. The only road to and from the town ran along a narrow causeway between the Inundation and the sea which was enfiladed by batteries mounted on the lower slopes of the Rock. The Inundation existed for about 200 years before it was infilled and built over after the Second World War.

== Creation of the Inundation ==
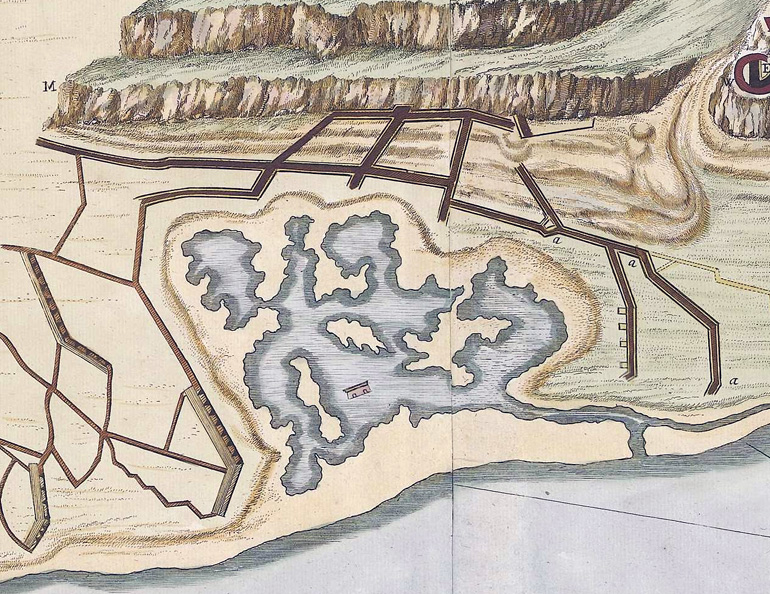
Map of the Morass, a marshy area in front of the gates of Gibraltar, which was later converted into the Inundation (north is to the left of the map). The lines around it are the Spanish trenches dug in the 1704 siege of Gibraltar.

Prior to the creation of the Inundation, the principal access to Gibraltar was via a narrow strip of land between the Morass and the cliff face of the Rock. During the Thirteenth Siege of Gibraltar, the Spanish had managed to dig trenches along this strip of land to reach within only 600 feet (180 m) of the walls of Gibraltar. A redan or flèche was built in front of the town's Landport Gate during the siege to overlook the Morass and provide additional defence.

Oliver Cromwell had suggested in the previous century that a canal could be dug across the isthmus to make Gibraltar an island. Although this idea was not taken up, British commanders decided to make the Morass a more substantial obstacle and in 1735, it was dug out and flooded to form a pear-shaped lake connected to the sea via a short channel. The water in the Inundation was originally held back by a 4 ft (1.2 m) high dike, which allowed the 5 ft (1.5 m) high tide to replenish it, though this arrangement was changed in the 19th century. The Inundation restricted landward access to Gibraltar to two narrow passages on either side of the water, one immediately below the sheer cliff face of the Rock and the other, which was used as the main road into Gibraltar (now Winston Churchill Avenue), forming a narrow causeway known as the Strand between the sea and the Landport Gate. According to a late 18th-century author, the Inundation measured about 200 yards (180 m) in length by about 60 yards (55 m) broad and was "nearly man-height" in depth.

To further restrict access, the British built two defended positions on either side of the northern end of the Inundation, not only to guard against a surprise attack but to prevent desertion by disgruntled members of Gibraltar's garrison. The Advance Guard Room was built on the east side on the foundations of an earlier Spanish fortification which had controlled movement across the strip of land adjoining the Morass. After William Green became Gibraltar's Senior Engineer in 1761, he had the Advance Guard Room (renamed Forbes' Barrier) more heavily fortified and also had the Bayside Barrier constructed on the other side to control access to the causeway. Both were surrounded by palisades.

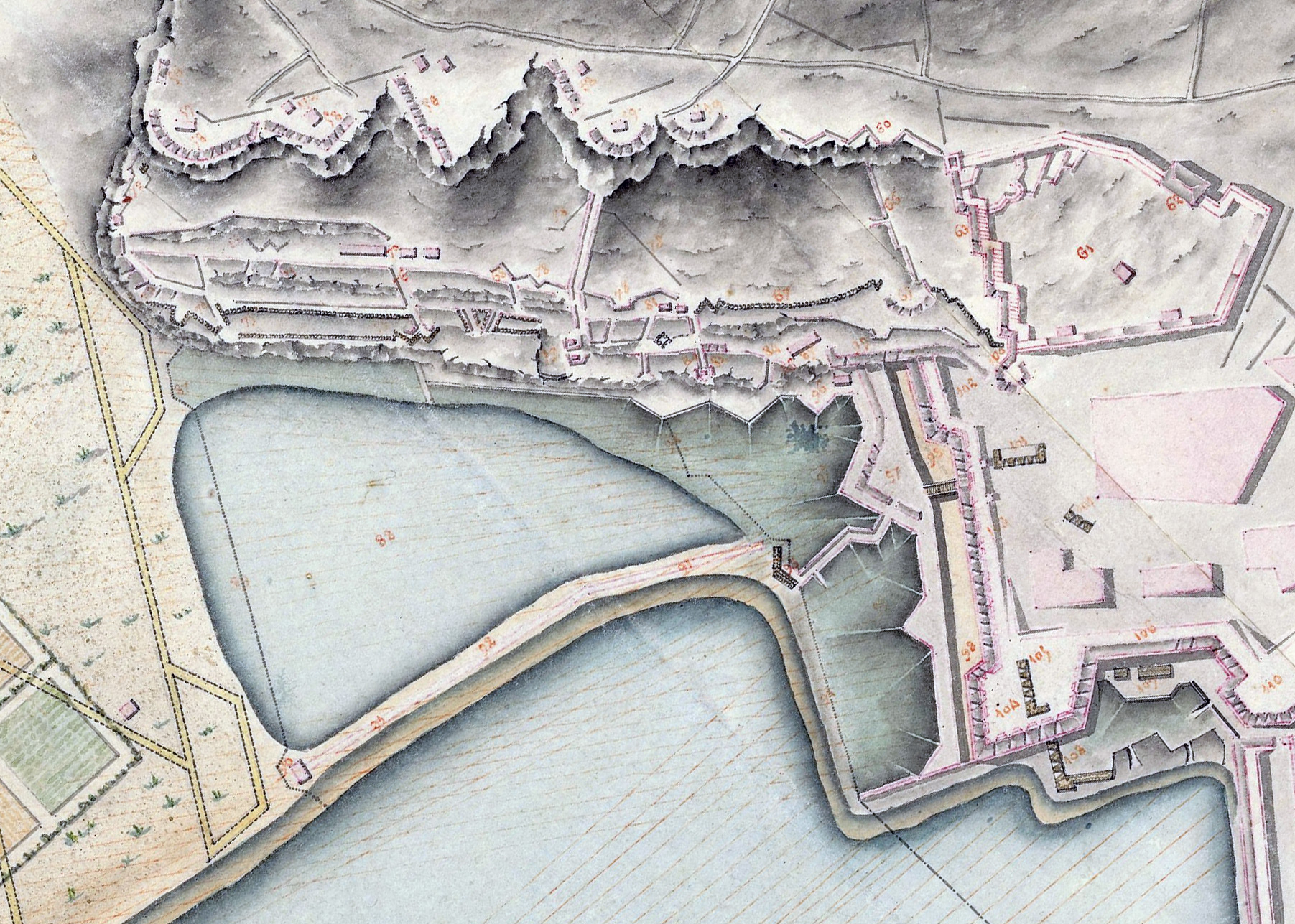
Clickable map of the Northern Defences of Gibraltar in 1810.

In the 1760s, a line of spiked chevaux de frise was constructed across the top and bottom ends of the Inundation. Ditches twelve feet wide and three feet deep were dug across the Inundation on both sides of the chevaux de frise so that if the lake ever dried out it would still serve as a barrier. Another barrier was constructed at the south end of the Inundation, and stakes were driven into the bed of the lake to serve as underwater obstacles. An unnamed correspondent for the London Chronicle wrote on 19 April 1762: "thro' the middle [of the Inundation] we have run chevaux de frize, lined with plates of iron, and studded with iron spikes, one row pointing towards Spain, and the other towards the garrison, to prevent desertion. They are five feet high, sunk in the mud, and the spikes above the water; by clasping your hands together, your fingers extended and the backs up, you will have an exact idea of them. Through this inundation an enemy must march to come near us, for the causeway is narrow, and when the tide is at lowest ebb, thirty men could not march a-breast upon the beach and causeway; upon which point we can bring above 300 cannon and mortars to bear, besides wall-pieces and small arms." Iron hoops and "many other articles to entangle and obstruct an enemy" were also scattered across the bottom of the Inundation.

Above the Inundation, the Rock of Gibraltar rose in a series of scarped steps which had been fortified with defensive walls, gun batteries and rock-cut trenches. The causeway was enfiladed by the King's, Queen's and Prince's Lines, by Willis' Battery above the lines and by still further batteries higher on the Rock, so that any enemy attempting to cross would be met by a hail of fire from several directions. In addition, the guns of the Grand Battery facing the isthmus were constantly trained on the causeway, as B. Cornwell recorded: "the guns on this battery are for this reason always kept charged with round and grape shot, and levelled just man-height from the surface of the isthmus; an artillery guard is also kept at this battery, and a lighted match constantly ready to apply to the cannon in case of necessity." A British clergyman, William Robertson, commented in an 1845 account of a visit to Gibraltar that "while crossing the causeway, the most inexperienced eye is struck with the terrible appearance of the batteries which command it, bristling with cannon, above and around." The Spanish called the landward approach to Gibraltar el Boca de Fuego, the "Mouth of Fire."

== Use of the Inundation in later years ==
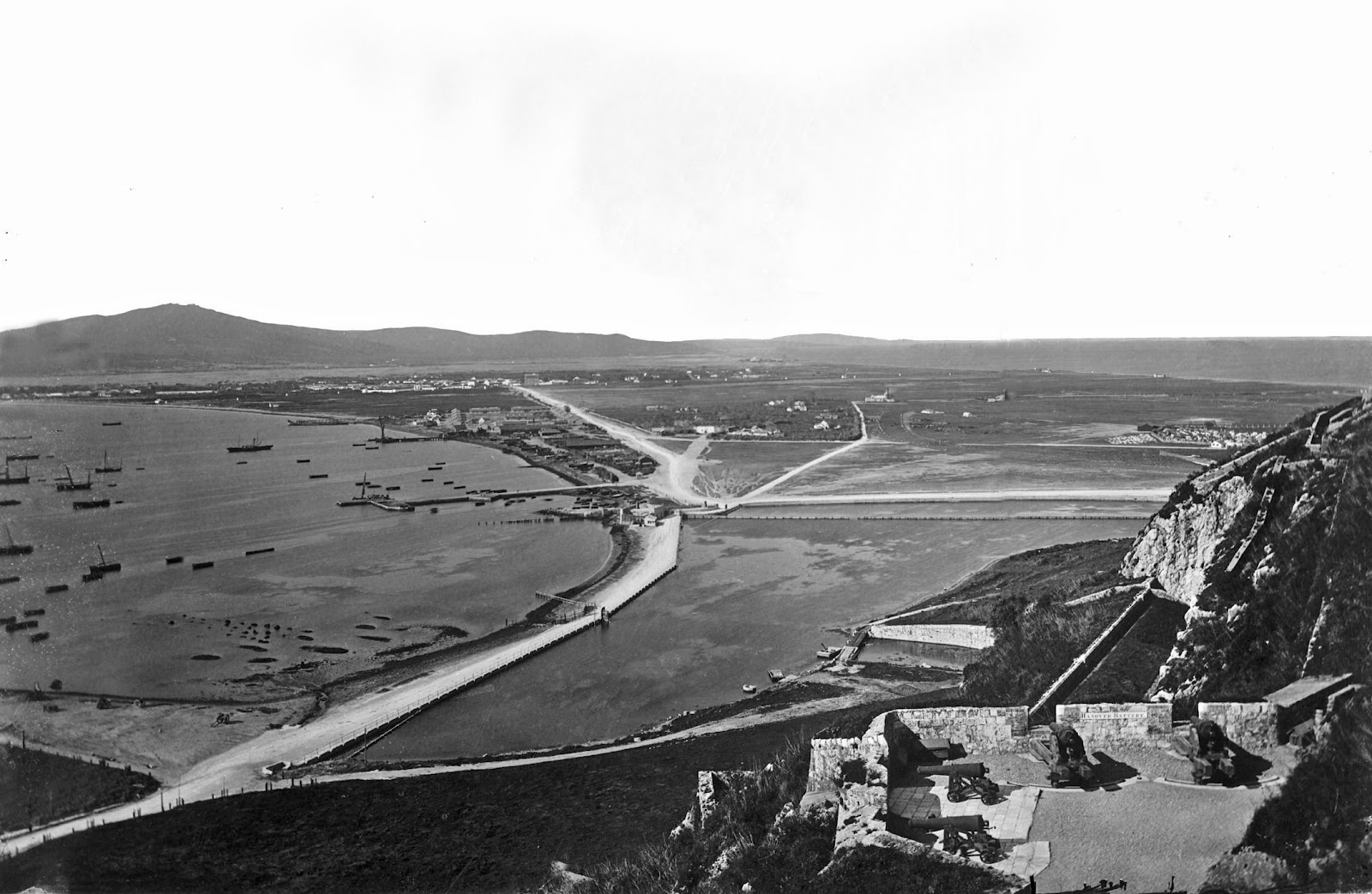
The Inundation seen from the Upper Lines, 1870s

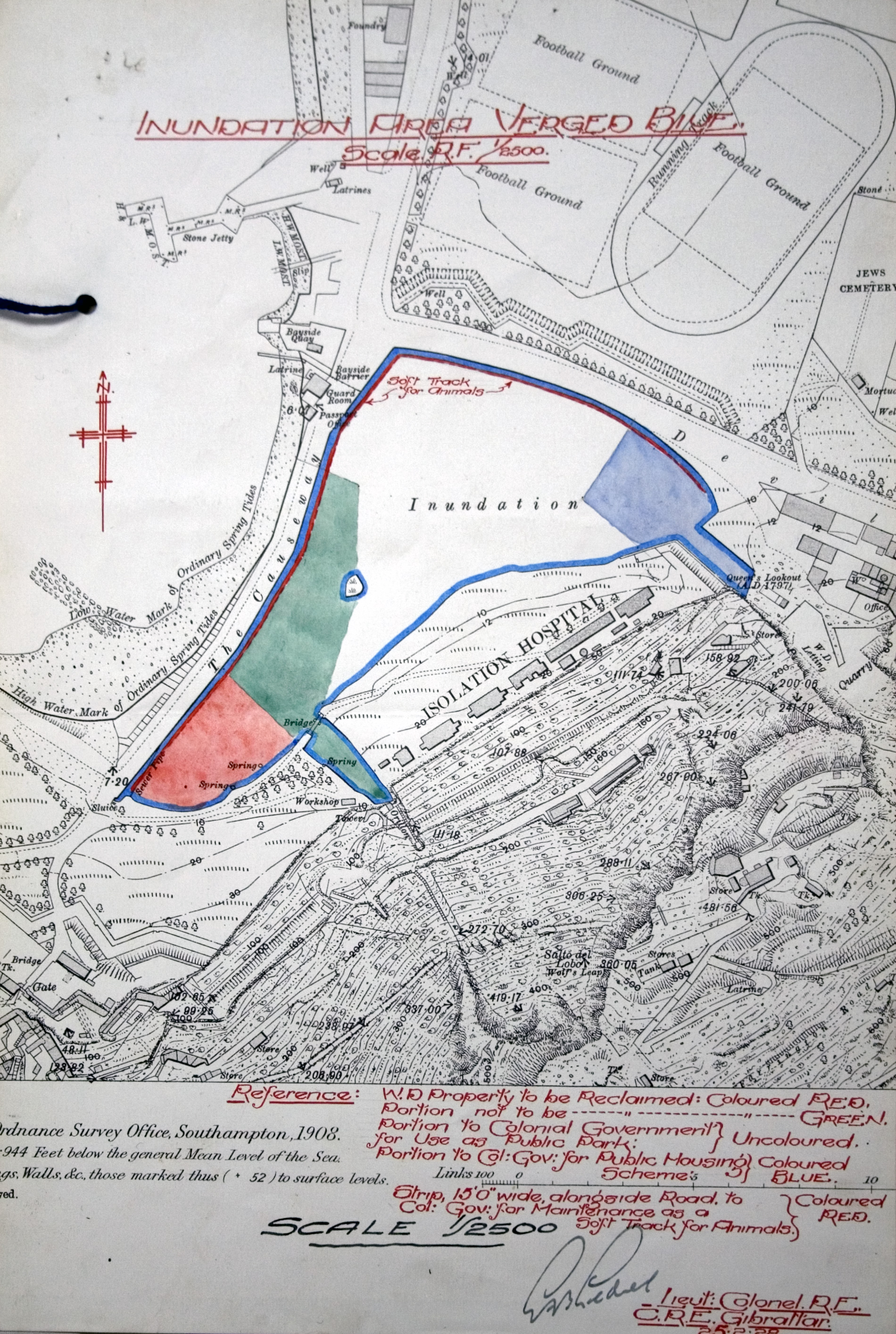
Map of the Inundation reclamation scheme put forward in 1928

The fortifications around the Inundation became the subject of a bitter dispute in 1789, a few years after the conclusion of the Great Siege of Gibraltar, when works were carried out to improve the North Front defences. Sir Robert Boyd, the then Governor of Gibraltar, ordered that a projecting rock at Forbes's Barrier was to be cut away. Colonel Robert Morse of the Royal Engineers, Gibraltar's senior engineer at the time, was vehemently opposed as he feared that it would weaken the northern defences. His protests to the War Office in London resulted in a party of engineers being dispatched to review the situation. The work was halted and their report unequivocally condemned the project as a bad idea:

[T]he removal of the bluff at Forbes's will render it extremely difficult to maintain a post at that pass, which appears absolutely necessary to retard the progress of an enemy and save the garrison from being shut up and insulted by even an interior force. The bluff at Forbes' prevents the direct enfilade of the foot of the Rock, and so far covers the advance and retreat of sallying parties. It likewise offers some security to the Waterport front against an enfilade and reverse fire. Having thus offered our ideas on the several points of the subject before us, we conclude by reporting as our opinion, that the removal of the bluff at Forbes's is a very improper measure.

After the Spanish blockade of Gibraltar ended following the destruction of the Lines of Contravallation in 1810, an increasing number of Spaniards came to work in the territory, travelling to and from it each day as they were not allowed to stay overnight. Writing in 1914, Horace Wyndham noted that Bayside Barrier would be the first point of assault in the event of a Spanish attack but that "the authorities, however, think it adequately protected by a corporal and three men." The gates at Bayside Barrier were locked overnight but as soon as they were opened each morning "an eager throng clamours for admission. Cabs crowded with three or four families, donkeys and mules staggering under immense loads of fruit and wine-skins, carts and barrows, and men, women and children all appear." Some 20,000 Spaniards a day crossed the causeway alongside the Inundation to work and sell goods in Gibraltar but were required to go home when a cannon was fired in the evening to signify the closure of the gates.

By the early 19th century the Inundation had become "a sickly morass", as the Marquess of Buckingham described it in his private diary. It was improved during the reforming governorship of Sir George Don, when it was "deepened, widened, and confined within walls of masonry, with regular sluices, by which means the whole can be let out and the place cleansed." By 1840, it was clean enough to be "well stocked with grey mullet", though only the soldiers of the garrison were permitted to fish there.

In 1927, Gibraltar's City Council proposed to widen the causeway by 15 feet (4.6 m). The British military authorities responded by proposing to reclaim the entire Inundation, with part of it to be used as a tip for the disposal of "suitable surplus material", part as a public park and part for a public housing scheme, with the War Office retaining control of a limited area. Gibraltar's then Governor, Sir Charles Monro, approved the scheme and noted its "desirability from a civil point of view of increasing to the greatest possible extent the area available for recreation grounds and building purposes in Gibraltar". He gave the go-ahead "as and when the financial situation permits", but in the event it was not drained and reclaimed until after the Second World War. During WW2 The Inundation was known by the troops as 'Lake Chad' after the Commander of the 1st Gibraltar Brigade, Brigadier T. E. Chad MC. The present-day Laguna Estate was built on top of it; its name, "lagoon" in Spanish, refers to the former Inundation.

== See also ==
- Disputed status of the isthmus between Gibraltar and Spain

== Bibliography ==
- Cornwell, B. (1782). A Description of Gibraltar: with an account of the blockade, siege, the attempt by nine sail of fire ships, the sally made from the garrison, and every thing remarkable or worthy notice that has occurred in that place since the commencement of the Spanish war. London: B. Cornwell.
- Fa, Darren; Finlayson, Clive (2006). The Fortifications of Gibraltar. Oxford: Osprey Publishing. ISBN 1-84603-016-1.
- Grenville, Richard Temple Nugent Brydges Chandos (1862). The Private Diary of Richard, Duke of Buckingham and Chandos, vol. 1. Hurst & Blackett.
- Hughes, Quentin; Migos, Athanassios (1995). Strong as the Rock of Gibraltar. Gibraltar: Exchange Publications. OCLC 48491998.
- Kellermann, Anja (2001). A "new" New English: Language, Politics, and Identity in Gibraltar. Heidelberger Schriften zur Sprache und Kultur, vol. 5. Books on Demand. ISBN 9783831123681.
- Landmann, George Thomas (1835). "Gibraltar". A Universal Gazetteer; or, Geographical Dictionary of the World. London: Longman & Co.
- Robertson, William (1845). Journal of a clergyman during a visit to the Peninsula in the summer and autumn of 1841. London: W. Blackwood & Sons.
- Lt Col Wilkie (July 1840). "The British Colonies considered as Military Posts". The United Service Magazine, Volume 33. p. 381.
- Wyndham, Horace (1914). Following the Drum. London: A. Melrose, Ltd.
