= Princess Charlotte's Battery =

Princess Charlotte's Battery was an artillery battery built in Gibraltar during the 18th century. It was constructed in the Willis's Plateau area on the upper northern slopes of the Rock of Gibraltar. Formerly called Catalan Battery, it was renamed after Sophia Charlotte of Hanover, the wife of King Frederick I of Prussia, who was the brother of King George I of Great Britain. The battery saw service in the Thirteenth Siege of Gibraltar in 1727 and inflicted substantial damage on the attacking Spanish forces. By 1773 it had two 12-pdr guns. Its armament was upgraded to four 24-pdrs in 1834, and from 1885 to 1889 it mounted two 64-pdr rifled muzzle loaders.

== Bibliography ==
- Hughes, Quentin; Migos, Athanassios (1995). Strong as the Rock of Gibraltar. Gibraltar: Exchange Publications. OCLC 48491998.
