= Hutment Battery =

Artillery battery in Southern Gibraltar

- Part of Fortifications of Gibraltar
- Gibraltar

Site information
- Type: Artillery battery
- Owner: Ministry of Defence

Location
- Location in Gibraltar

Hutment Battery is an artillery battery in the British Overseas Territory of Gibraltar. The battery got its name from its proximity to the military hutment area near Bleak House. In 1878, the battery mounted an RML 12.5-inch 38-ton gun.

== Publications ==
- Hughes, Quentin & Migos, Athanassios, 1995. Strong as the Rock of Gibraltar, Exchange Publications, Gibraltar
