= Salto del Lobo =

Gibraltar viewpoint

Coordinates: 36°08′46″N 5°20′57″W

The Salto del Lobo ("Wolf's Leap") or Peregil was a point on the North Face of the Rock of Gibraltar overlooking Spanish territory and the Neutral Ground between Gibraltar and Spain.

== Bibliography ==
- Hughes, Quentin; Migos, Athanassios (1995). Strong as the Rock of Gibraltar. Gibraltar: Exchange Publications. OCLC 48491998.
