= Prince's Lines =

Fortifications in Gibraltar

- Part of Fortifications of Gibraltar
- Gibraltar
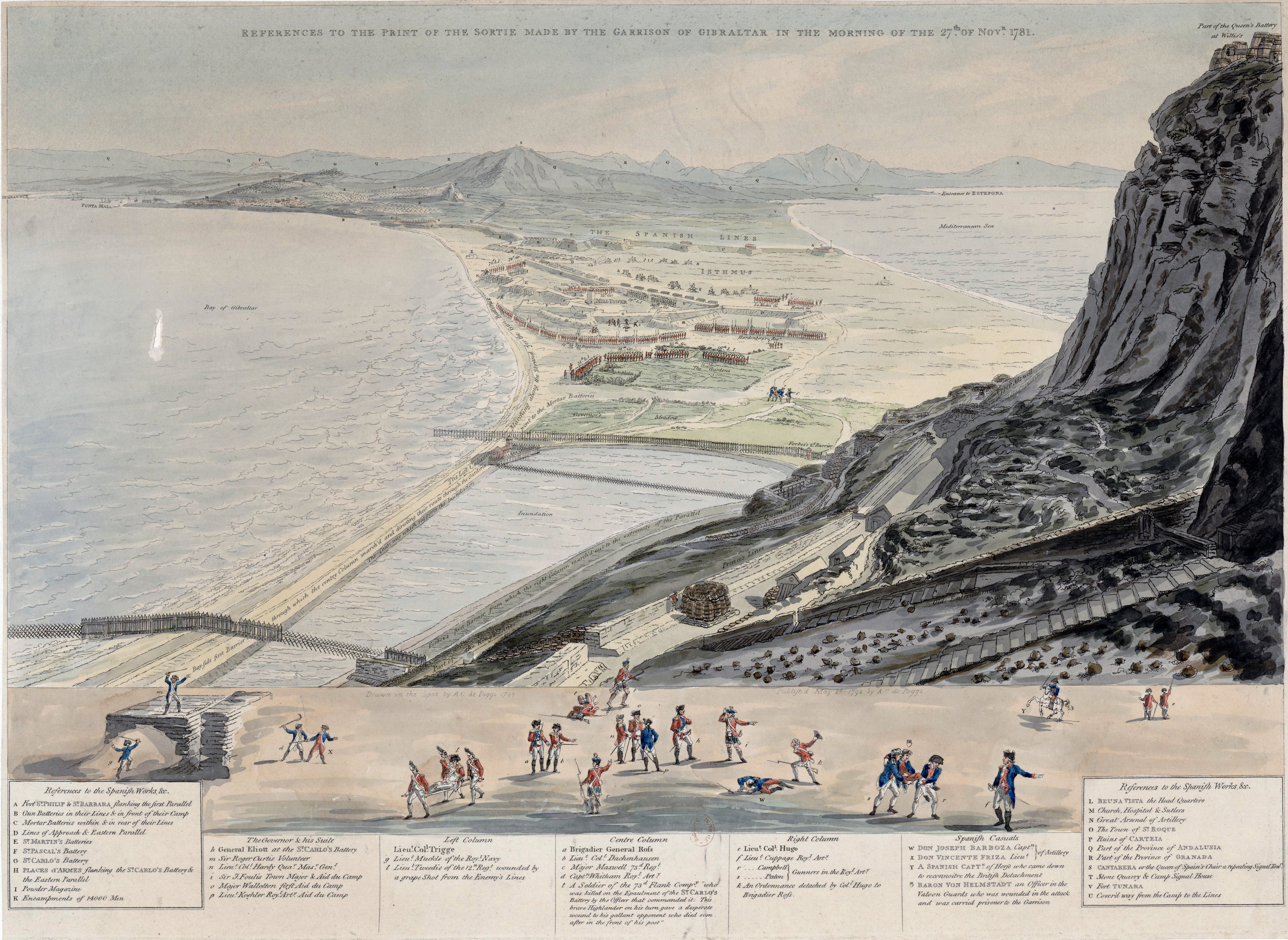
- View of the Prince's Lines and the Isthmus in 1783

Site information
- Type: Fortified defensive lines
- Owner: Government of Gibraltar
- Condition: Abandoned

Location
- Location of the Prince's Lines in Gibraltar
- Location within Gibraltar
- Coordinates: 36.146703°N 5.347647°W

The Prince's Lines are part of the fortifications of Gibraltar, situated on the lower slopes of the north-west face of the Rock of Gibraltar. They are located at a height of about 70 feet (21 m) on a natural ledge above the Queen's Lines, overlooking the landward entrance to Gibraltar, and run from a natural fault called the Orillon to a cliff at the southern end of the isthmus linking Gibraltar with Spain. The lines face out across the modern Laguna Estate, which stands on the site of the Inundation, an artificial lake created to obstruct landward access to Gibraltar. They were constructed to enfilade attackers approaching Gibraltar's Landport Front from the landward direction.

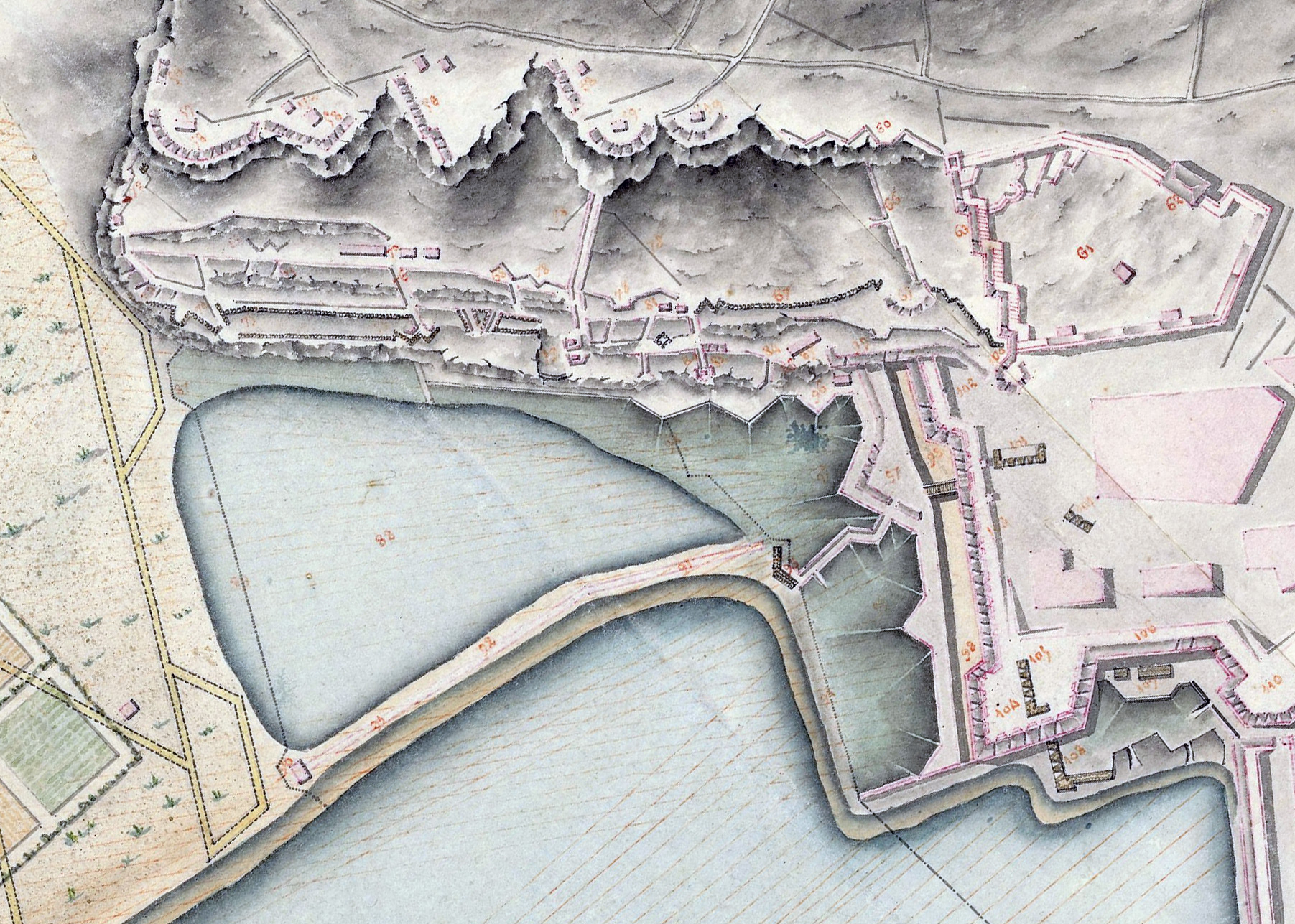
Clickable map of the Northern Defences of Gibraltar in 1810 (north is to the left)

A fortification constructed by the Spanish or Moors appears to have existed on the site before the British capture of Gibraltar in 1704, but the Lines were principally constructed during the 18th century. They were first laid out in 1720, and a stone stepped communication passage was later built to connect them with the Queen's Lines. William Green carried out major improvements after 1761, repairing the parapets, scarping the cliff, repairing the banquets and parapets and smoothing the ditches with mortar. To prevent shells and rubble rolling into the Lines from behind, dry rubble walls were constructed to their rear. The glacis in front of the Lines was also cleared of boulders and crevices were infilled to deny enemy soldiers any shelter. A bombproof barracks, magazine and cookhouse were built at the same time. During the construction of the Lines, an "entire human skeleton" was discovered fossilised in the rock but was blown to pieces by a miner. Nothing else is recorded about this find, but only a few decades later, the first known Neanderthal skull was found nearby.

The Lines saw action during the Thirteenth Siege of Gibraltar (1726–27), when they mounted two cannon and several swivel guns which were reported to have caused heavy casualties among the attacking Spanish force. During the Anglo-Spanish War of 1761–63, they mounted two 9-pdrs and five 6-pdrs, and by 1770 they could accommodate up to fifty wall-mounted guns using sockets cut into the eastern end of the parapet's crest. A communication gallery was cut in 1790. The Lines were bombarded again during the Great Siege of Gibraltar (1779–83). On 11 June 1782, a Spanish shell exploded inside the magazine of Princess Anne's Battery further up the Rock, causing a massive explosion that blew the flank of the battery into the Prince's Lines, killing fourteen soldiers.

Prince's Lines
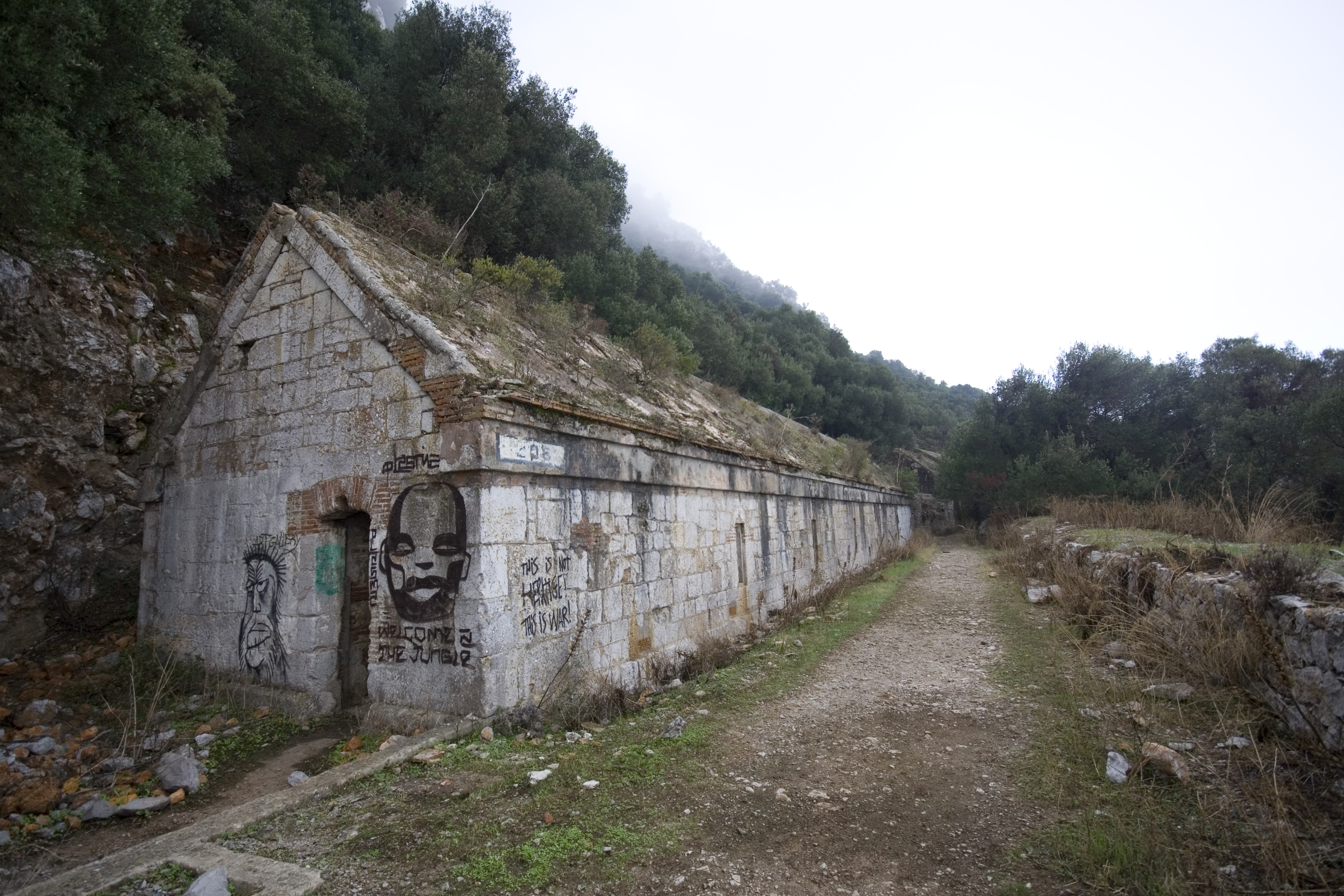
The Bombproof Barracks on the Prince's Lines

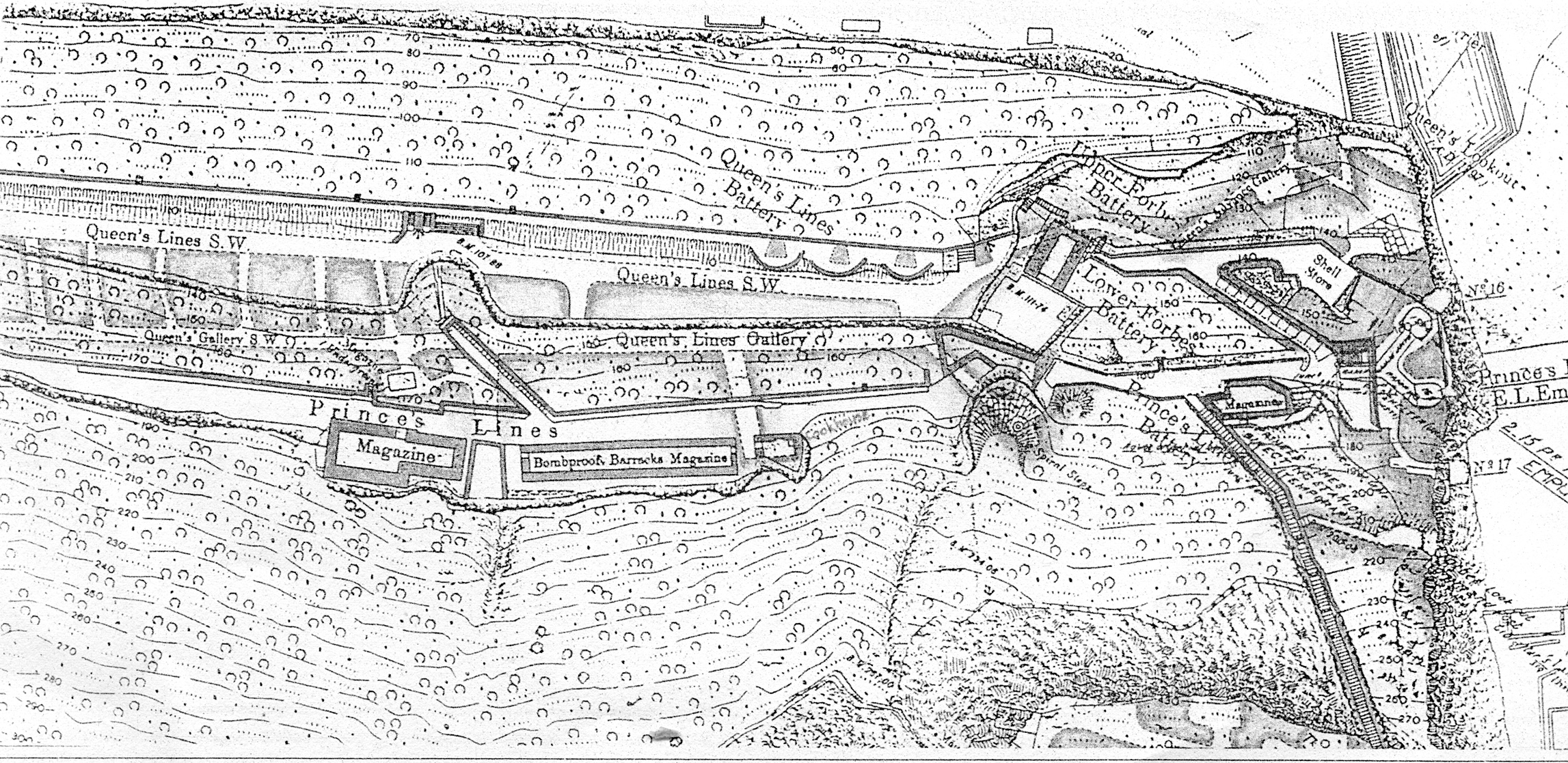
1908 Ordnance Survey map of the Queen's Lines and Prince's Lines

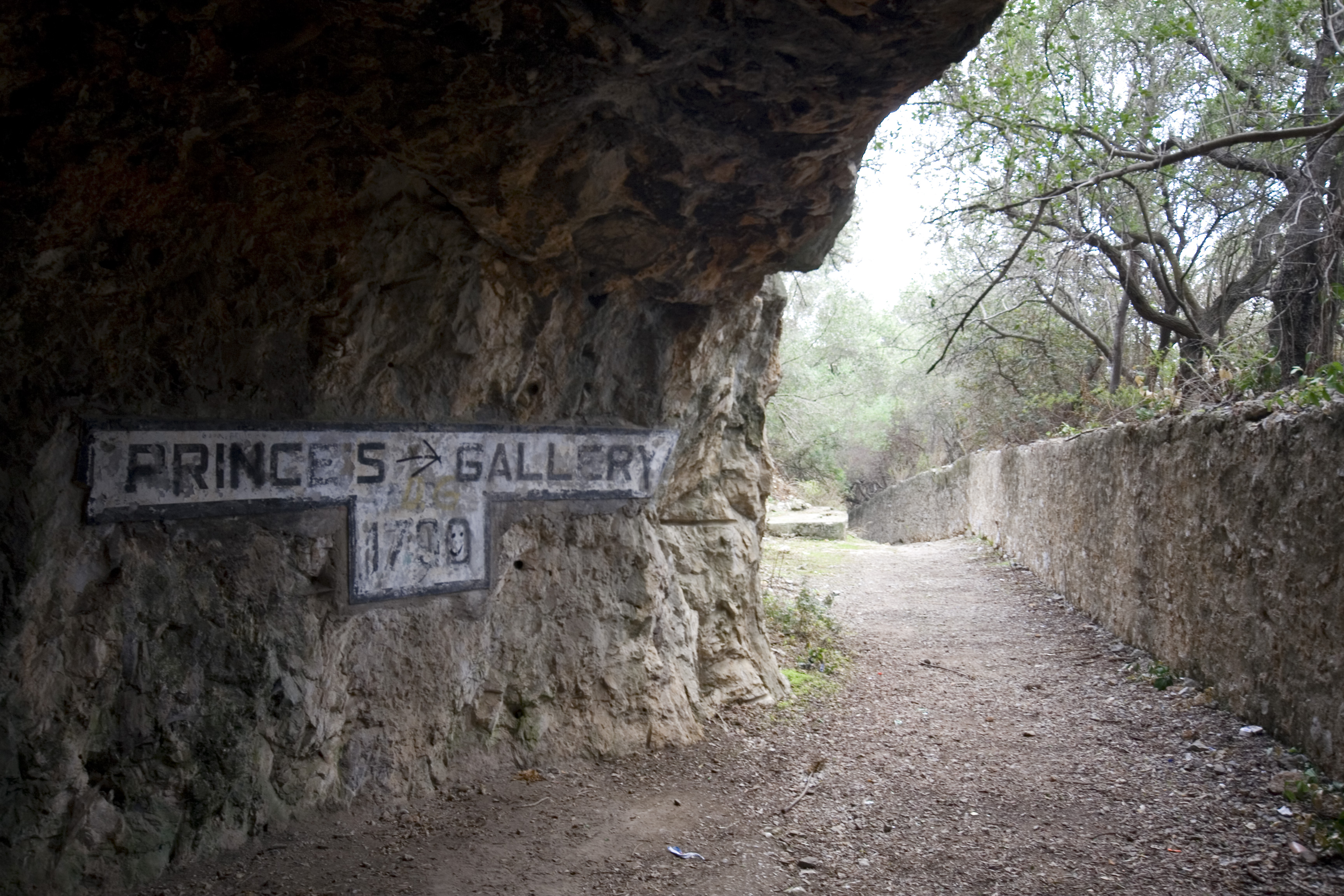
The Prince's Gallery, a 1790 tunnel giving access to the Lines

Hanover Battery stands at the west end of the Lines. At the eastern end of the Lines are Lower Forbes Battery and Prince's Lines Battery, which was repurposed during the Second World War to mount a searchlight housed inside a cantilevered iron cupola. The parapet of the Lines was raised during the war to provide loopholes for rifles, with a second wall added behind and the space roofed over with concrete. The Lines are still mostly intact but have been abandoned and are now in a state of overgrown disrepair.

== Bibliography ==
- Cornwell, B. (1782). A Description of Gibraltar: with an account of the blockade, siege, the attempt by nine sail of fire ships, the sally made from the garrison, and every thing remarkable or worthy notice that has occurred in that place since the commencement of the Spanish war. London: B. Cornwell.
- Drinkwater, John (1786). A history of the late siege of Gibraltar, by John Drinkwater. London. OCLC 631054.
- Fa, Darren; Finlayson, Clive (2006). The Fortifications of Gibraltar. Oxford: Osprey Publishing. ISBN 1-84603-016-1.
- Hughes, Quentin; Migos, Athanassios (1995). Strong as the Rock of Gibraltar. Gibraltar: Exchange Publications. OCLC 48491998.
- Stringer, Chris (2000). "Gibraltar and the Neanderthals 1848-1998". In Stringer, Chris; Barton, R.N.E.; Finlayson, Clive (eds.). Neanderthals on the Edge: Papers from a Conference Marking the 150th Anniversary of the Forbes' Quarry Discovery, Gibraltar. Oxford: Oxbow Books. ISBN 978-1-84217-015-1.
