= Ragged Staff Guard =

Coordinates: 36°08′03″N 5°21′13″W

Ragged Staff Guard is a fortification situated to the south of the British Overseas Territory of Gibraltar.

== Description ==
The guard is located along the Line Wall Curtain, and immediately beyond Southport Ditch immediately south of South Bastion, next to Ragged Staff Gates and the Navy boat sheds. It was detached some hundreds of yards from all buildings, and supplied no posts within the city's gates. The guard house could be seen by approaching ships. In the 1840s it was said to be a full-time job for the subaltern who was stationed here above a long flight of steps as he had to inspect every good that went through Ragged Staff Gates. The guard house gained notoriety in the early 19th century as a yellow fever station.
