= Upper Battery =

Artillery battery in Gibraltar

- Part of Fortifications of Gibraltar
- Gibraltar

Site information
- Type: Artillery battery
- Owner: Ministry of Defence

Upper Battery is a former artillery battery in the British Overseas Territory of Gibraltar. It was located on the Upper Ridge of the Rock of Gibraltar at a site south of Signal Hill Battery and faced east over the Mediterranean. It mounted two 32-pdrs. in 1861. On the other side of the hill, three 24-pdrs. were mounted at Lower Battery. The two batteries were used for signalling and drill purposes.

The name "Upper Battery" was later used as a generic term for the three batteries mounting Gibraltar's main counter-bombardment guns, at Lord Airey's, O'Hara's and Spur Batteries.
