= Tower Battery =

Artillery battery in Gibraltar

- Part of Fortifications of Gibraltar
- Gibraltar

Site information
- Type: Artillery battery
- Owner: Ministry of Defence

Tower Battery is an artillery battery in the British Overseas Territory of Gibraltar.
