= Rosia Batteries =

Rosia Battery
- Part of Fortifications of Gibraltar
- Gibraltar
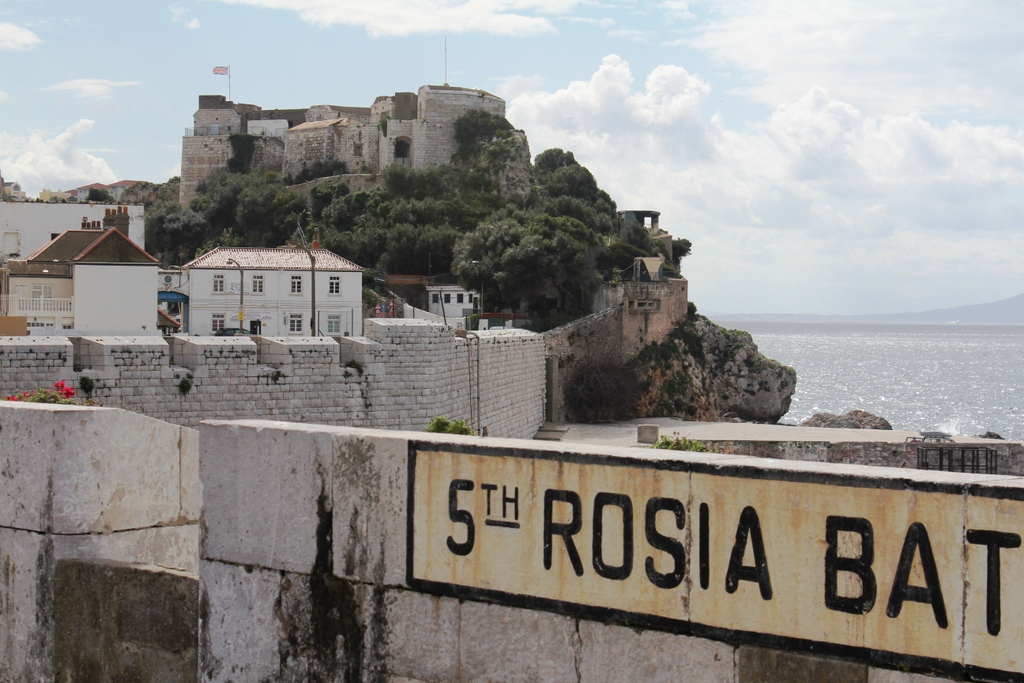
- 5th Rosia Battery

Site information
- Type: Artillery batteries
- Owner: Government of Gibraltar

Location
- Location in Gibraltar
- Coordinates: 36.122522°N 5.352762°W

The Rosia Batteries are a group of artillery batteries in the British Overseas Territory of Gibraltar.

== Description ==
These batteries are on the surround the east side of Rosia Bay. The batteries and the connected defensive wall are Class A listed buildings as designated by the Government of Gibraltar's Gibraltar Heritage Trust Act of 1989.
