= Jews' Cemetery Battery =

Former British military unit in Gibraltar

- Part of Fortifications of Gibraltar
- Gibraltar
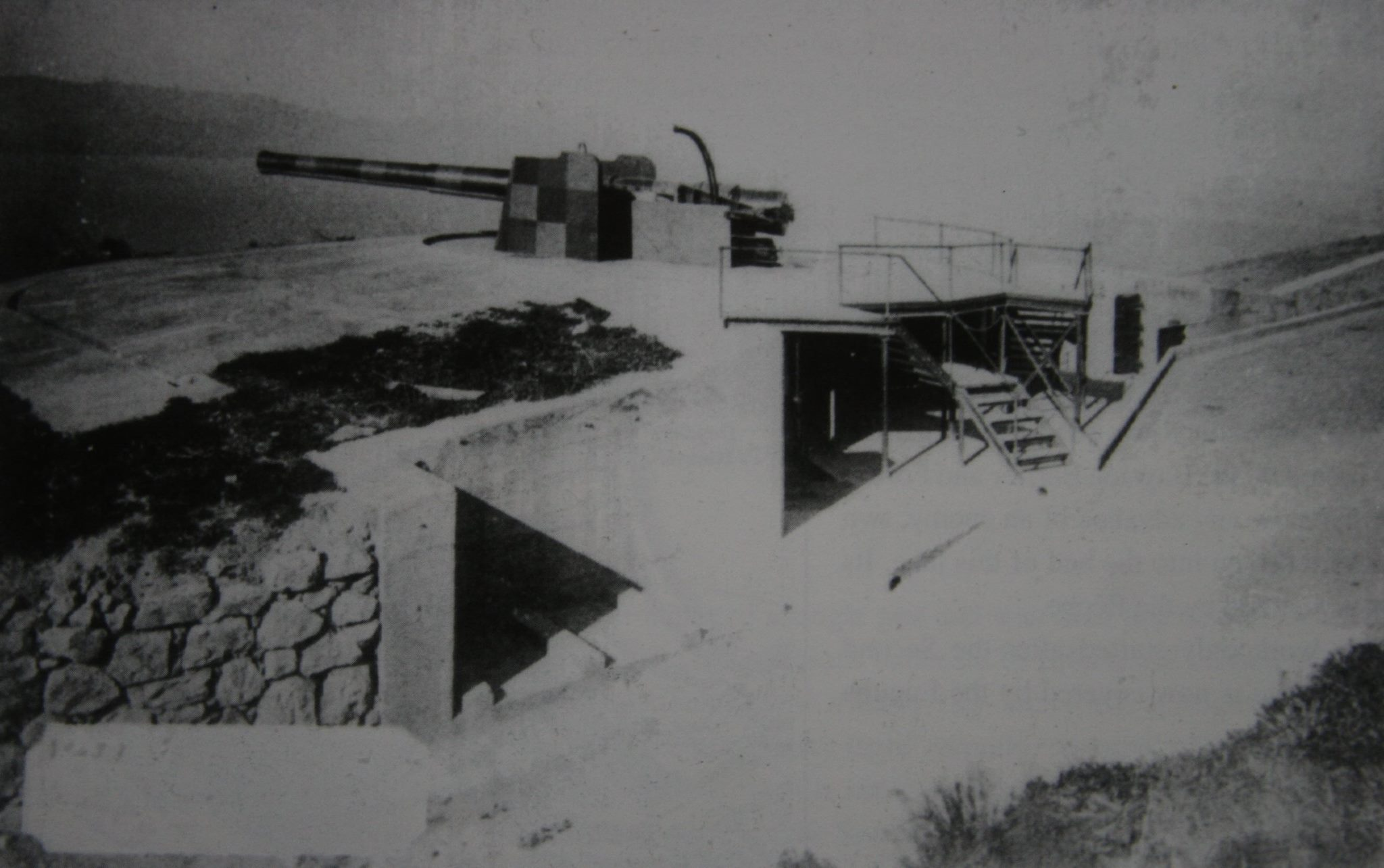
- Jew's Cemetery Battery equipped with a 9.2 inch Mk X in 1906

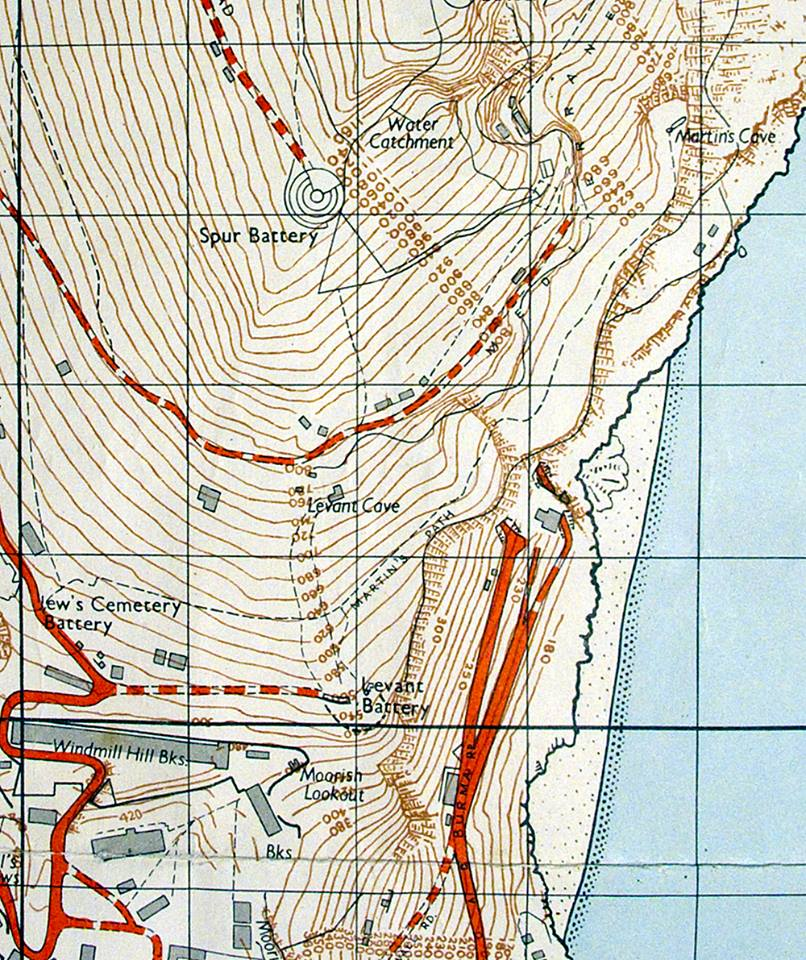
- South east section of a 1961 military map of Gibraltar showing this battery

Site information
- Type: Artillery battery
- Owner: Ministry of Defence
- Open to the public: Yes

Location
- Location in Gibraltar
- Coordinates: 36.120611°N 5.345833°W

Jews' Cemetery Battery was an artillery battery in the British Overseas Territory of Gibraltar.

== Description ==
At the start of the twentieth century this battery had a large 9.2 inch RML gun. This was one of 14 on the Rock. Its purpose was to engage shipping and to prevent a landing on Gibraltar. This gun was also placed on top of Gibraltar and these guns could hit the coast of North Africa.
