= Ragged Staff Gates =

- Part of Fortifications of Gibraltar
- Gibraltar
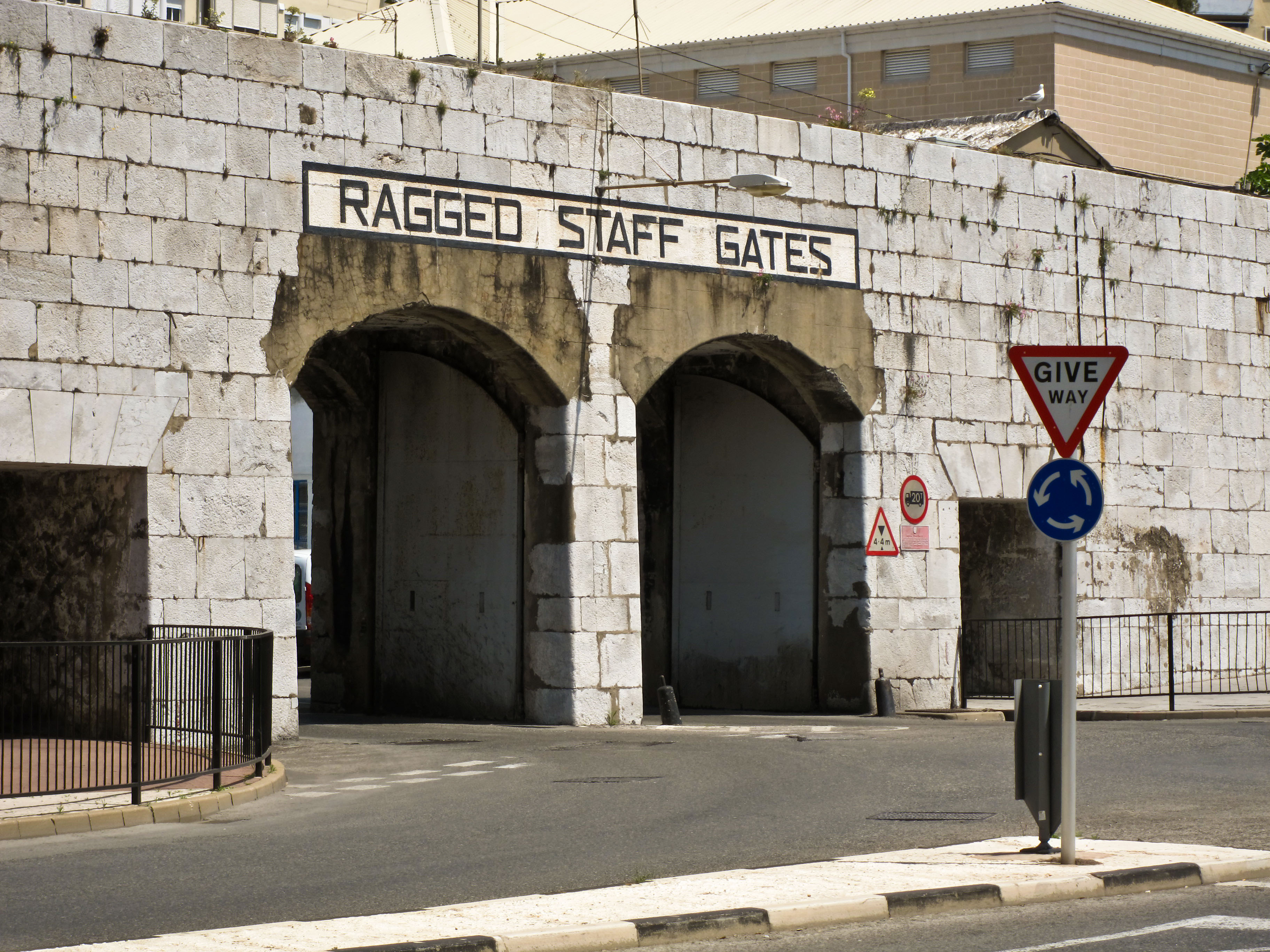
- View of the gates from the west

Site information
- Type: Gate
- Owner: Government of Gibraltar
- Open to the public: Yes

Location
- Location in Gibraltar
- Coordinates: 36.133882°N 5.353732°W

Ragged Staff Gates are a set of city gates in the British Overseas Territory of Gibraltar. They are located between South Bastion and Ragged Staff Guard, opposite the Navy Boat Sheds.

== History ==
It took some time for Ragged Staff Gates to reach their current size. They open access through the section of the Line Wall Curtain immediately south of South Bastion across the Southport Ditch.

A contractor to the Victualling Yard built a wharf roughly 100 metres (330 ft) long where goods were delivered via steps and a drawbridge. This was known as the Ragged Staff Couvreport. The first gate at Ragged Staff was cut through the defensive wall in 1736. The new gates led to what was known as Ordnance Wharf which projected in front of the Dockyard's North Gate. Behind the gate there was an enclosure defended by soldiers in its guardroom. The flank position had three embrasures in its parapet but appears to have only mounted two guns in 1779.

The nearby Ragged Staff Guard house could be seen by approaching ships. In the 1840s it was said to be a full-time job for the subaltern who had to inspect all the goods that went through the gates. The gates for pedestrian passage were cut through on both sides of the main gates in 1843 and in 1921.

There is debate but no conclusion over the origin of the name "Ragged Staff". One of the possibilities is that it came from the symbol for Morvidus who was a legendary Earl of Warwick. He fought and killed a giant using an uprooted tree, hence the symbol of a ragged staff, but there is no consensus.
