= Prince Ferdinand's Battery =

Artillery battery in Gibraltar

- Part of Fortifications of Gibraltar
- Gibraltar
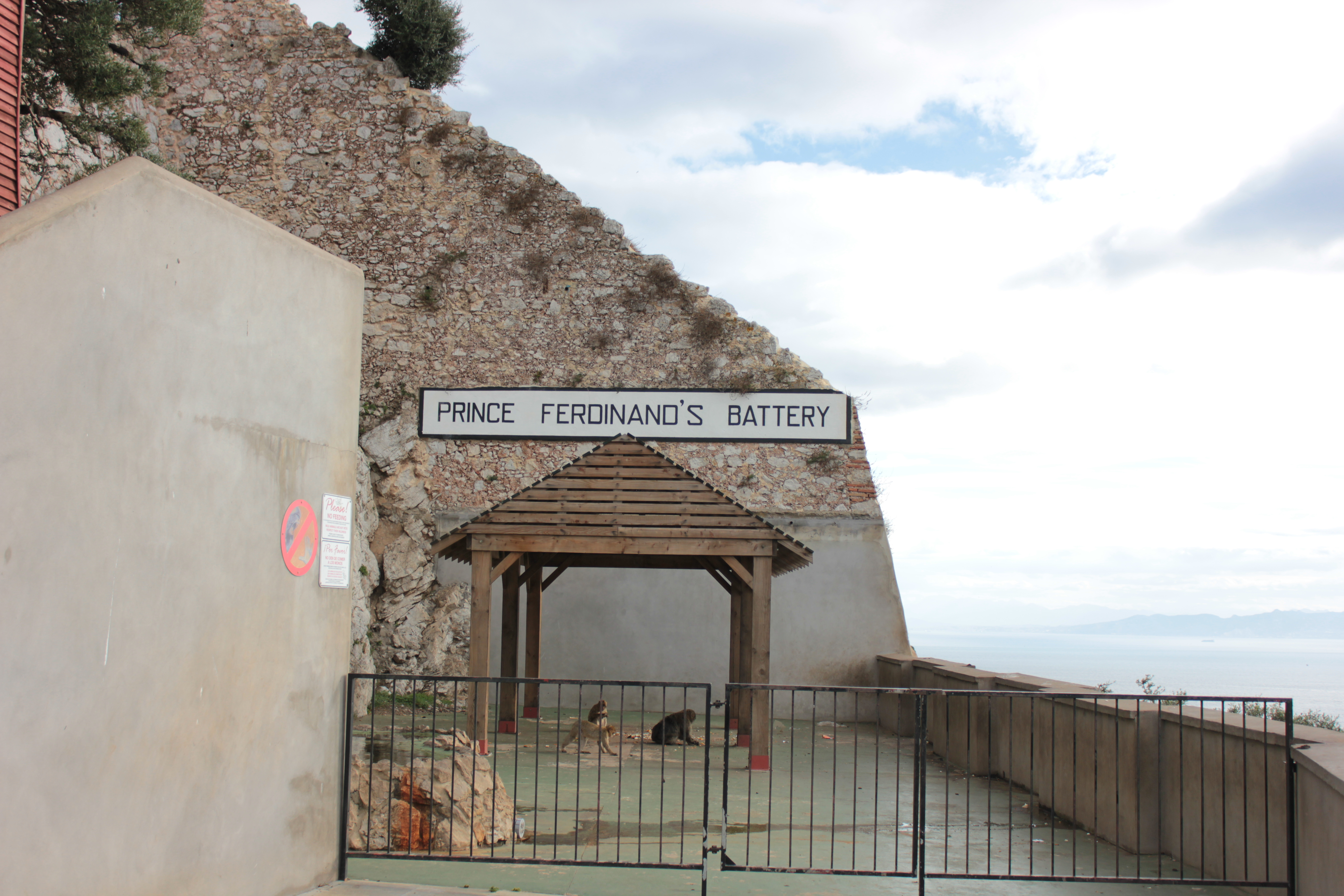
- Prince Ferdinand's Battery

Site information
- Type: Artillery battery
- Owner: Government of Gibraltar

Location
- Location in Gibraltar
- Coordinates: 36.132243°N 5.348879°W

Prince Ferdinand's Battery was an artillery battery in the British Overseas Territory of Gibraltar. Today the area is known as the Apes' Den and is the main location for tourists to see Barbary macaques in Gibraltar.

== Description ==
The battery which is now much better known as Apes' Den is located at the base of the upper section of Charles V Wall within the Upper Rock Nature Reserve where it is breached by Queen's Gate.
