= Buffadero Battery =

Artillery battery in Gibraltar

- Part of Fortifications of Gibraltar
- Gibraltar
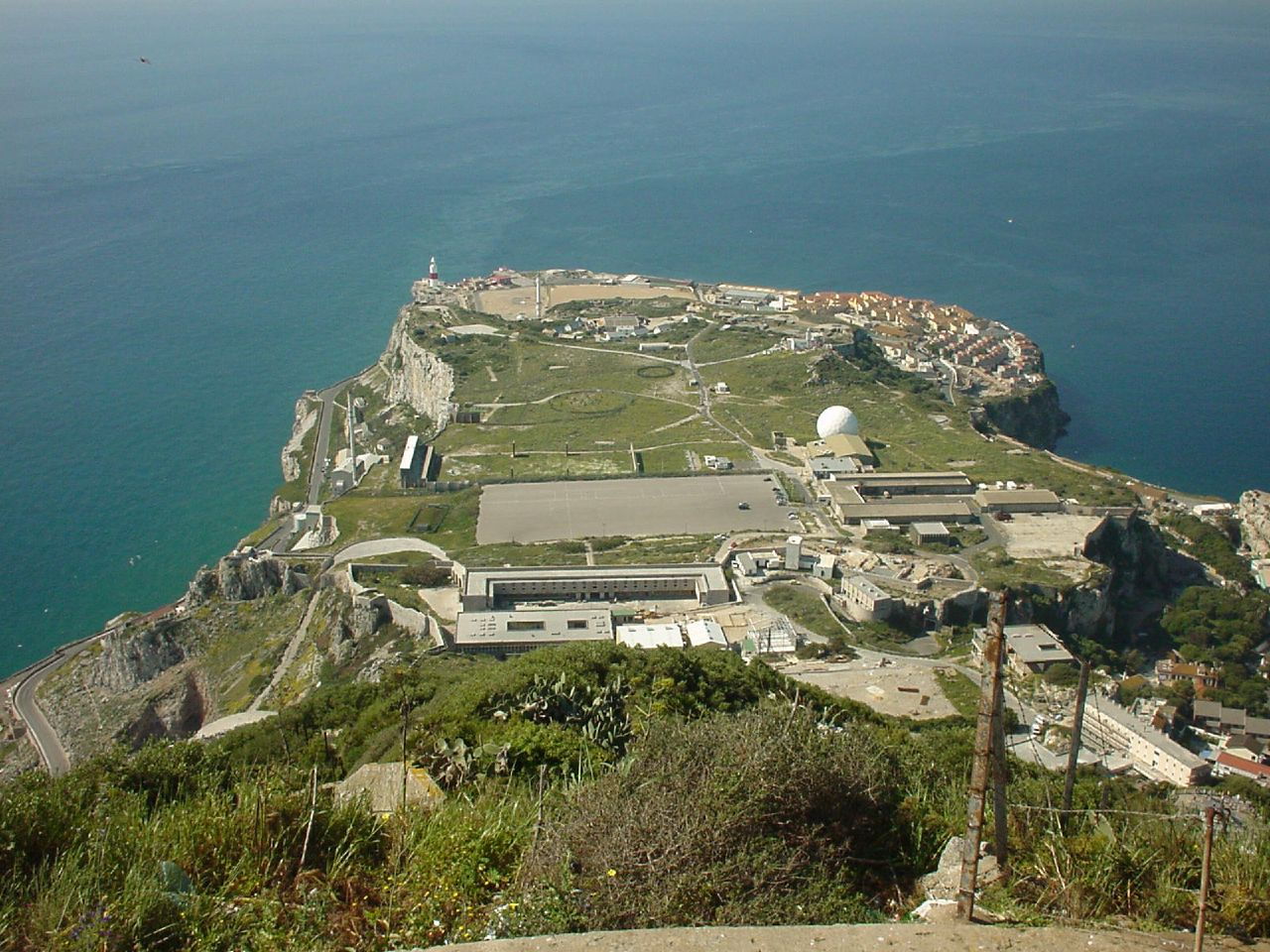
- the Buffadero training centre

Site information
- Type: Artillery battery
- Owner: Ministry of Defence

Location
- Location in Gibraltar
- Coordinates: 36.113478°N 5.344541°W

Buffadero Battery was an artillery battery in the British Overseas Territory of Gibraltar. It is located on Windmill Hill.

== Description ==
Buffadero was the name of a village where people lived at the south end of Gibraltar before World War II. According to the Royal Engineers, Buffadero is possibly an anglicized corruption derived from the Spanish "bufido", which means "blowing" or "snorting", or it might be of Genoese origin as many Genoese workmen had been employed in Gibraltar.

At the end of the nineteenth century Buffadero Battery had a BL 9.2 inch gun Mk IX–X, which was one of 14 installed in Gibraltar. The guns were intended to counter 8" guns on cruisers. At Gibraltar, these guns could fire across the Straits of Gibraltar and could hit shipping on the coast of Morocco, thus enabling Gibraltar to command the Straits. A well-like cave was in close proximity to the battery.

Today, the Buffadero Training Centre includes two live firing ranges, an obstacle course, and a mock village. Soldiers use the village to train for urban combat.
