= Landport (Gibraltar) =

Tunnel in Gibraltar

- Part of Fortifications of Gibraltar
- Grand Casemates Square, Gibraltar
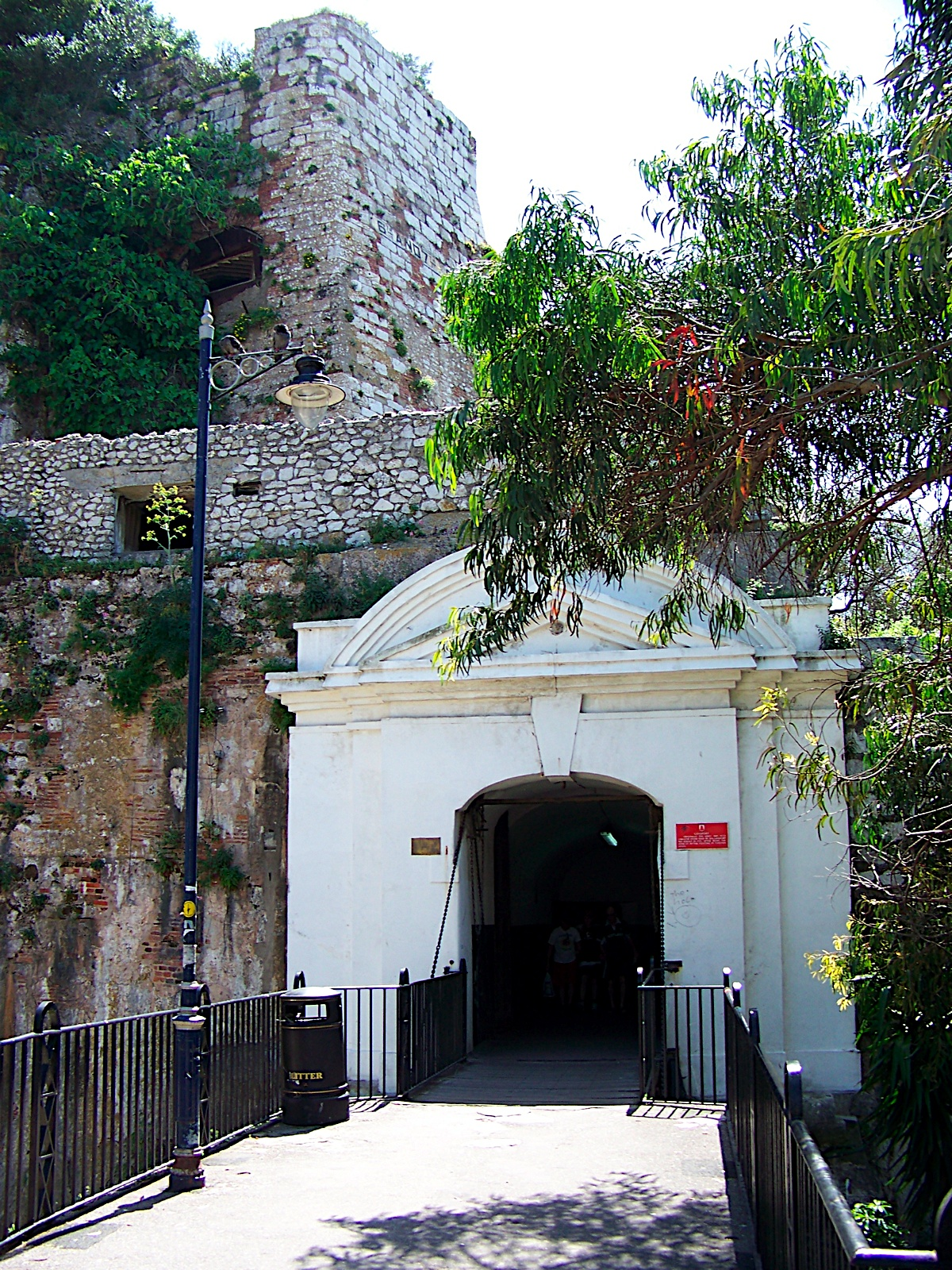

Site information
- Owner: Government of Gibraltar
- Open to the public: Yes

Location
- Coordinates: 36°08′43″N 5°21′05″W

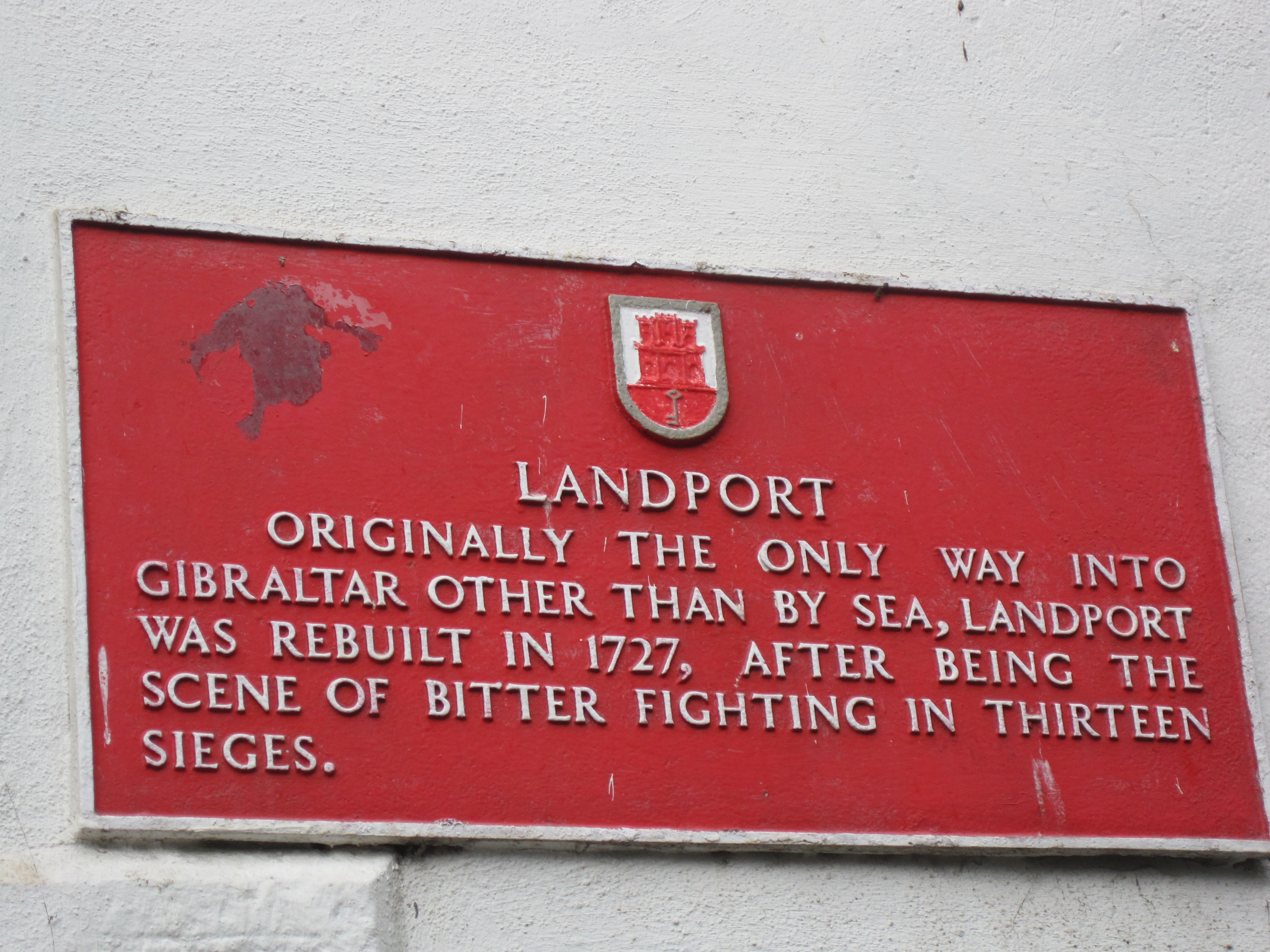

The Landport (Spanish: Puerta de Tierra) is a gate into the territory of Gibraltar. It was originally the only entrance to the fortification from the land and so was heavily fortified and guarded.

== Description ==
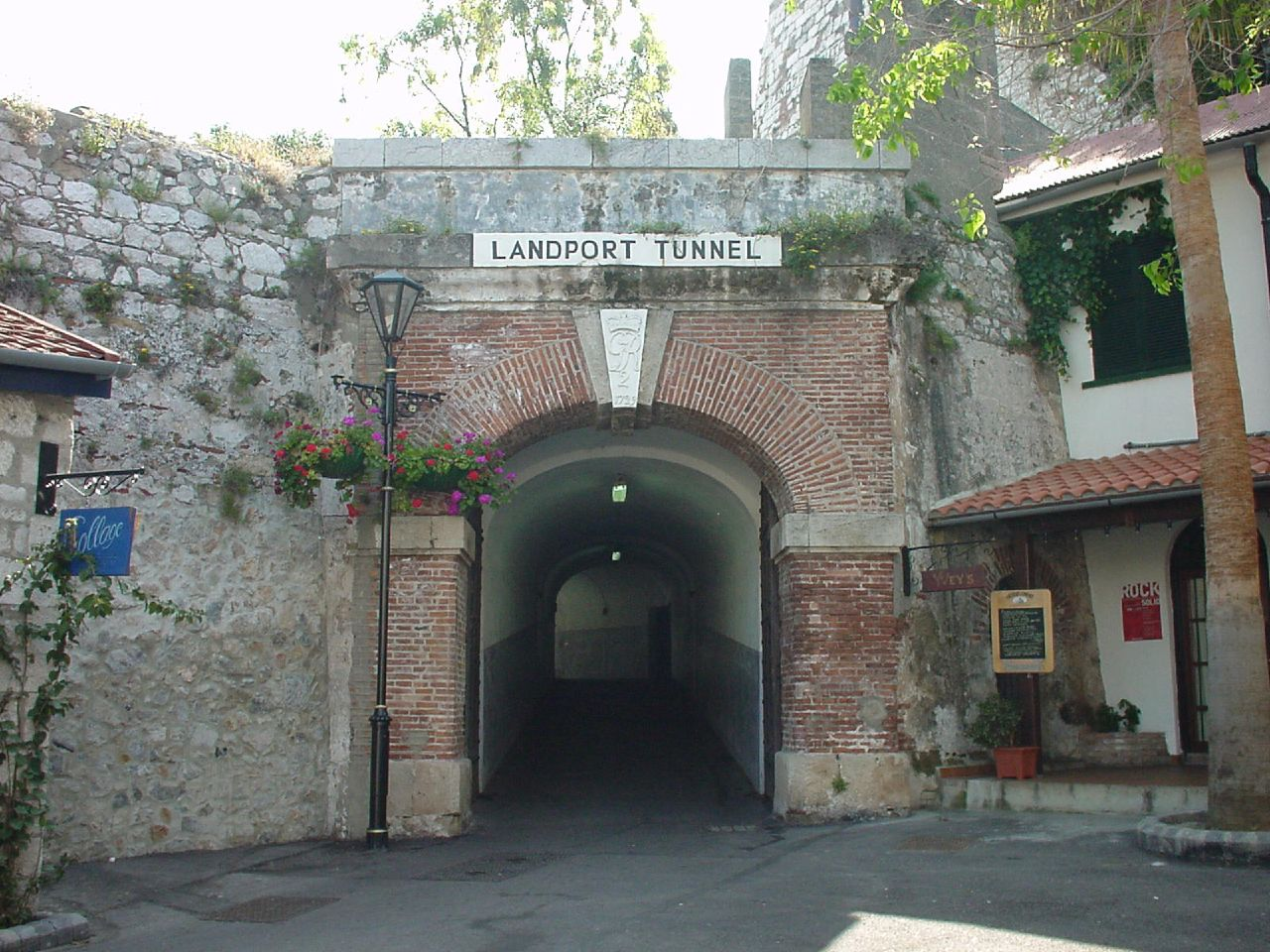
The tunnel to the gate inside the fortification.

After the territory was first captured from the Spanish in 1704, the British defended the Landport with twenty guns. The gate was subsequently defended by the Inundation — a flooded and fortified area of ground measuring about 200 yards (180 m) in length by about 60 yards (55 m) broad and was "nearly man-height" in depth. There were also obstacles in it such as chevaux de frise and metal hoops. There was also a moat covering the northern approach — the Landport Ditch. The ditch's defences included a palisade and a gunpowder mine which could be exploded beneath an assault. To cross these defences, there was a drawbridge which was pulled up at night. Tobacco smugglers would exit the gate at this time and lurk outside, waiting for an opportunity to cross the neutral ground into Spain during the night.

== See also ==
- Grand Casemates Gates
- King James's and Landport Gates — similar gates in the port of Portsmouth
- Southport Gates
