= Genista Battery =

Artillery battery in Gibraltar

- Part of Fortifications of Gibraltar
- Gibraltar

Site information
- Type: Artillery battery
- Owner: Ministry of Defence

Location
- Coordinates: 36°07′02″N 5°20′51″W

Genista Battery is an artillery battery in the British Overseas Territory of Gibraltar.

== Description ==
In 1906 this battery had three 6-inch (152 mm) guns but by World War II it had two 6 inch guns. The battery was directed from the "Gun Operation Room" which was hidden and protected underground with tunnels leading to Lathbury Barracks and to the north end of the Rock via a number of tunnels including the Great North Road.

The name for this area comes from Captain Frederick Brome, who was Governor of the Military Prison on Windmill Hill, and he and his prisoners excavated what was to be called Genista Cave in the 1860s. The cave attracted scientific interest including George Busk from London who referring to the cave as "Genista" as a link to its discover as "Genisteae" is the Latin name of the shrub "Broom".
