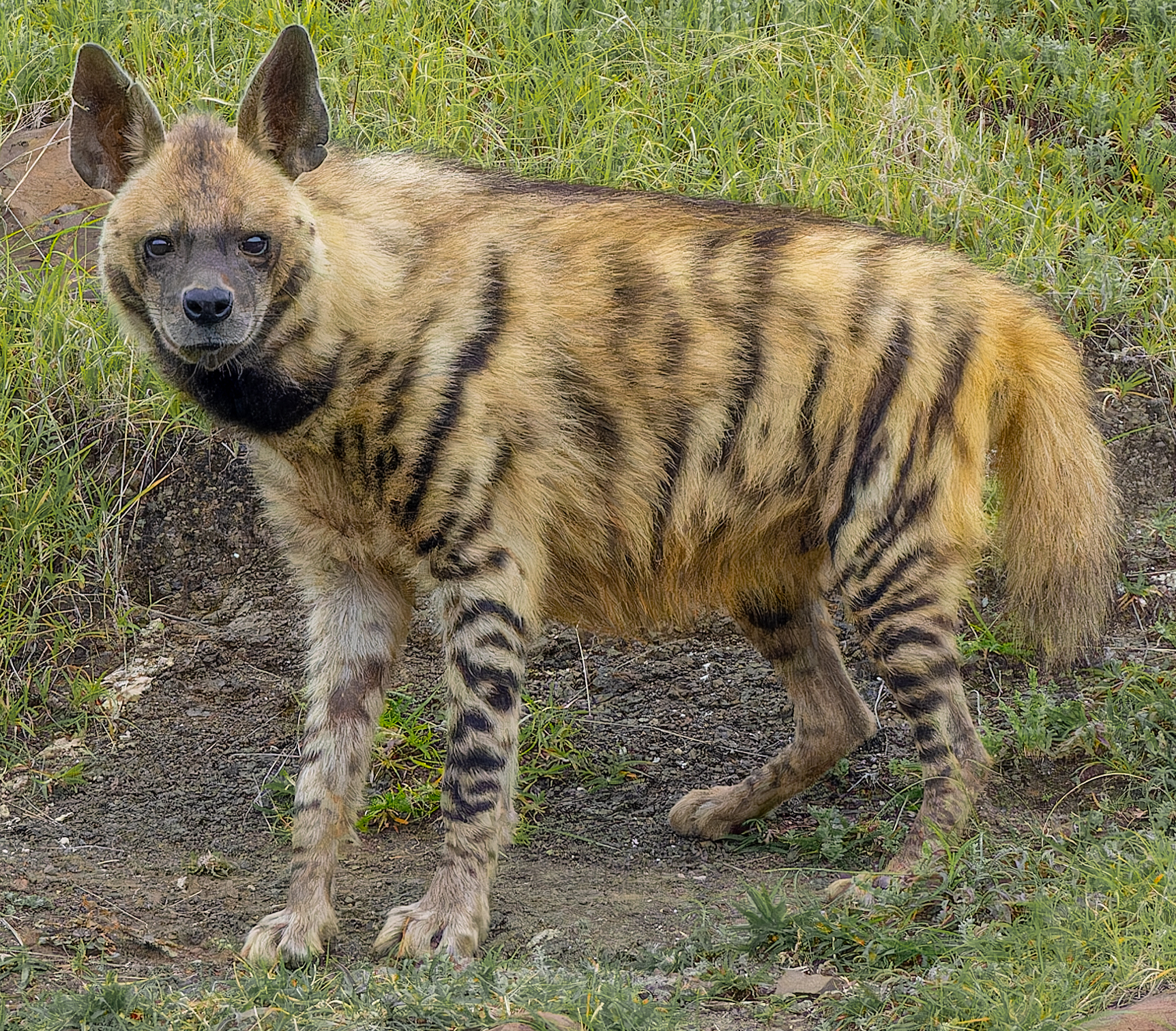

Conservation status
- Near Threatened (IUCN 3.1)
- CITES Appendix II

Scientific classification
- Kingdom: Animalia
- Phylum: Chordata
- Class: Mammalia
- Order: Carnivora
- Family: Hyaenidae
- Subfamily: Hyaeninae
- Genus: Hyaena; Brisson, 1762
- Species: H. hyaena

Binomial name
- Hyaena hyaena (Linnaeus, 1758)
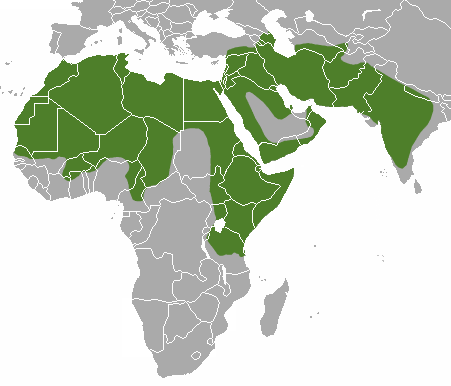
- Striped hyena range

Synonyms
- List: Canis hyaena Linnaeus, 1758; Hyaena antiquorum (Temminck, 1820); Hyaena barbara de Blainville, 1844; Hyaena bergeri Matschie, 1910; Hyaena bilkiewiczi Satunin, 1905; Hyaena bokcharensis Satunin, 1905; Hyaena dubbah Meyer, 1793; Hyaena dubia Schinz, 1821; Hyaena fasciata Thunberg, 1820; Hyaena hienomelas Matschie, 1900; Hyaena hyaenomelas (Bruce In Desmarest, 1820); Hyaena indica de Blainville, 1844; Hyaena orientalis Tiedemann, 1808; Hyaena rendilis Lönnberg, 1912; Hyaena satunini Matschie, 1910; Hyaena schillingsi Matschie, 1900; Hyaena striata Zimmermann, 1777; Hyaena suilla Filippi, 1853; Hyaena sultana Pocock, 1934; Hyaena syriaca Matschie, 1900; Hyaena virgata Ogilby, 1840; Hyaena vulgaris Desmarest, 1820; Hyaena zarudnyi Satunin, 1905

= Striped hyena =

Striped hyena Temporal range: Early Pleistocene – Recent

Species of hyena

The striped hyena (Hyaena hyaena) is a species of hyena native to North and East Africa, the Middle East, the Caucasus, Central Asia, and the Indian subcontinent. It is the only extant species in the genus Hyaena. It is listed on the IUCN Red List as near-threatened, as the global population is estimated to be under 10,000 mature individuals which continues to experience deliberate and incidental persecution along with a decrease in its prey base such that it may come close to meeting a continuing decline of 10% over the next three generations.

It is the smallest of the bone-cracking hyenas and retains many primitive viverrid-like characteristics lost in larger species, having a smaller and less specialised skull. Though primarily a scavenger, large specimens have been known to kill their own prey, and attacks on humans have occurred in rare instances. The striped hyena is a monogamous animal, with both males and females assisting one another in raising their cubs. A nocturnal animal, the striped hyena typically only emerges in complete darkness, and is quick to return to its lair before sunrise. Although it has a habit of feigning death when attacked, it has been known to stand its ground against larger predators in disputes over food.

The striped hyena features prominently in Middle Eastern and Asian folklore. In some areas, its body parts are considered magical, and are used as charms or talismans. It is mentioned in the Hebrew Bible, where it is referred to as tzebua or zevoa, though it is absent in some Bible translations into English. Ancient Greeks knew it as γλάνος (glános) and ύαινα (húaina) and were familiar with it from the Aegean coast of Asia Minor. The striped hyena is the national animal of Lebanon.

== Evolution ==
Striped hyena fossils are common in Africa, with records going back as far as the Early Pleistocene. The species may have evolved from Hyaenictitherium namaquensis of Pliocene Africa. As fossil striped hyenas are absent from the Mediterranean region, it is likely that the species is a relatively late invader to Eurasia, having likely spread outside Africa only after the extirpation of spotted hyenas from Asia at the end of the last glacial period. The striped hyena occurred for some time in Europe during the Pleistocene, having been particularly widespread in France and Germany. It also occurred in Montmaurin, Hollabrunn in Austria, the Furninha Cave in Portugal, and the Genista Caves in Gibraltar. The European form was similar in appearance to modern populations, but was larger, being comparable in size to the brown hyena.

== Description ==
=== Build ===
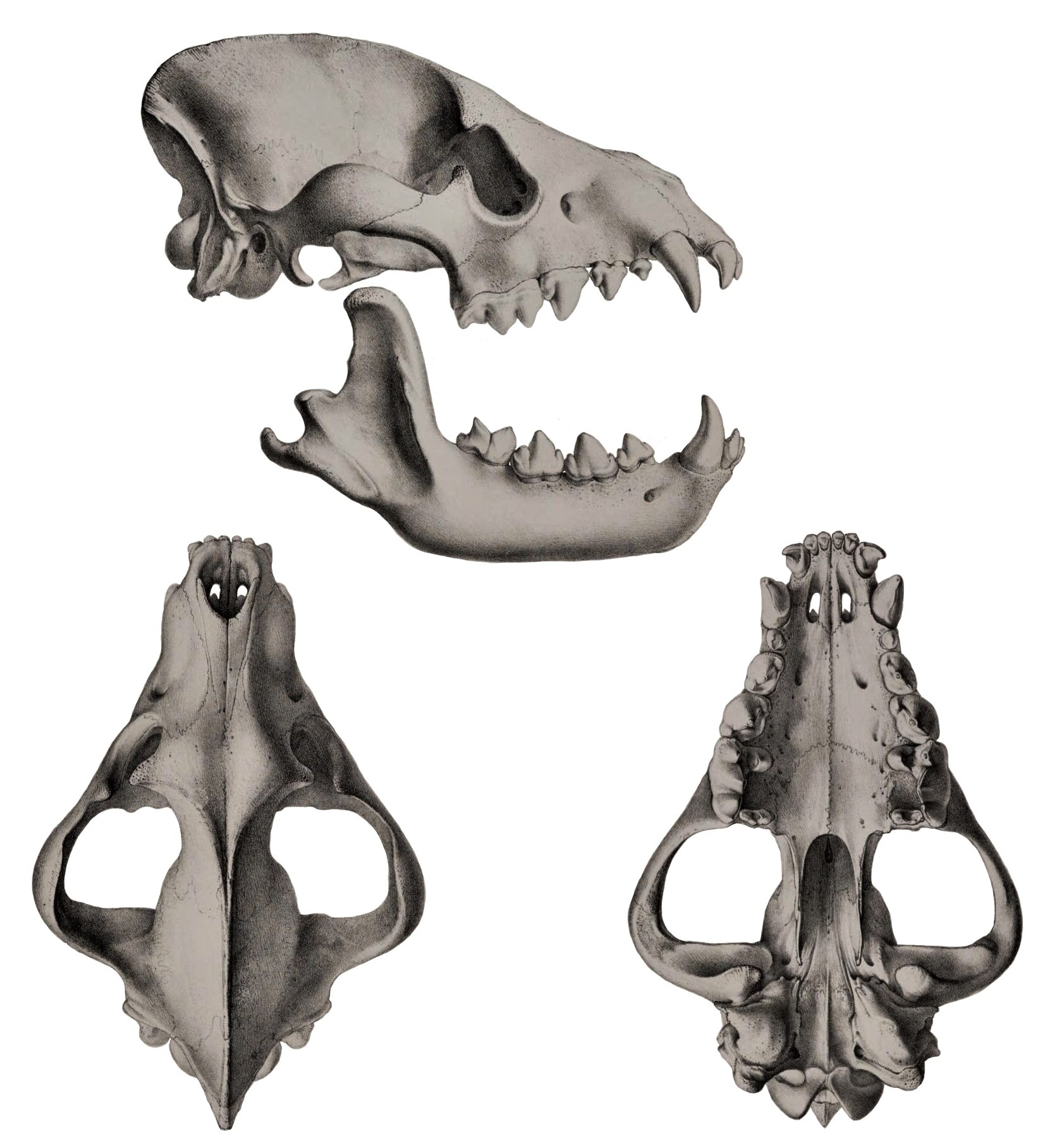
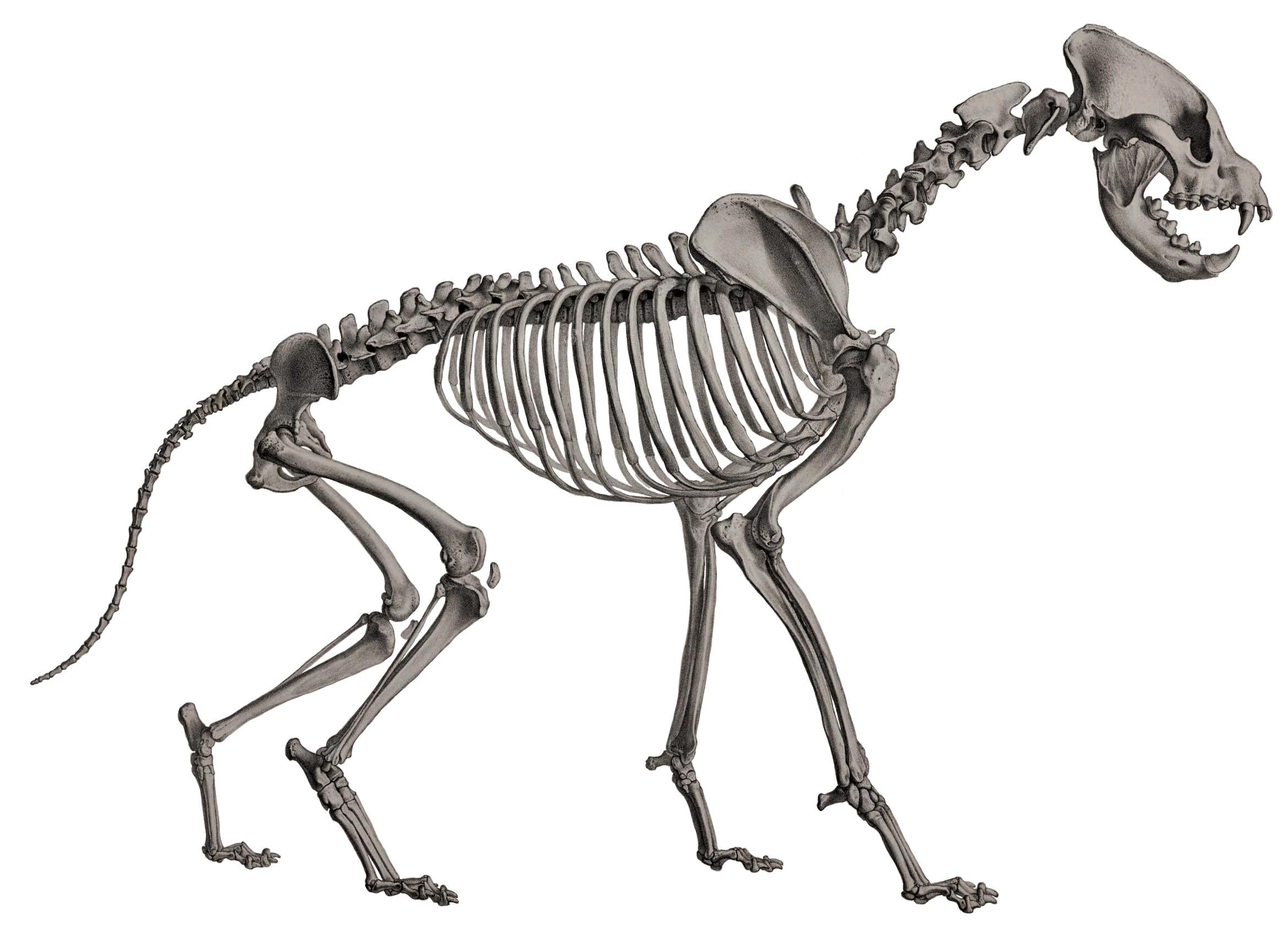
Illustrations of skull and skeleton

The striped hyena has a fairly massive, but short torso set on long legs. The hind legs are significantly shorter than the forelimbs; the back slopes down towards the tail. The legs are relatively thin and weak, with the forelegs being bent at the carpal region. The neck is thick, long and largely immobile, while the head is heavy and massive with a shortened facial region. The eyes are small, while the sharply pointed ears are very large, broad and set high on the head. Like all hyenas, the striped hyena has bulky pads on its paws, as well as blunt but powerful claws. The tail is short and the terminal hairs do not descend below the achilles tendon. The female striped hyena's genitalia are transiently masculinized, although it lacks the enlarged clitoris and false scrotal sack noted in the female genitalia of the spotted hyena. The female has 3 pairs of nipples. Adult weight can range from 22 to 55 kg (49 to 121 lb), averaging at about 35 kg (77 lb). Body length can range from 85 to 130 cm (33 to 51 in), not counting a tail of 25 to 40 cm (9.8 to 15.7 in), and shoulder height is between 60–80 cm (24–31 in). The male has a large pouch of naked skin located at the anal opening. Large anal glands open into it from above the anus. Several sebaceous glands are present between the openings of the anal glands and above them. The anus can be everted up to a length of 5 cm, and is everted during social interaction and mating. When attacked, the striped hyena everts its rectum and sprays a pungent smelling liquid from its anal glands. Its sense of smell is acute, though its eyesight and sense of hearing are weak.

The skull is entirely typical of the genus, having a very high sagittal crest, a shortened facial region and an inflated frontal bone. The skull of the striped hyena differs from that of the brown and spotted hyena by its smaller size and slightly less massive build. It is nonetheless still powerfully structured and well adapted to anchoring exceptionally strong jaw muscles which give it enough bite-force to splinter a camel's thigh bone. Although the dentition is overall smaller than that of the spotted hyena, the upper molar of the striped hyena is far larger. The dental formula is 3.1.4.0–13.1.3.1.

=== Fur ===
The winter coat is unusually long and uniform for an animal its size, with a luxuriant mane of tough, long hairs along the back from the occiput to the base of the tail. The coat is generally coarse and bristly, though this varies according to season. In winter, the coat is fairly dense, soft, and has well-developed underfur. The guard hairs are 50–75 mm (2.0–3.0 in) long on the flanks, 150–225 mm (5.9–8.9 in) long on the mane and 150 mm (5.9 in) on the tail. In summer, the coat is much shorter and coarser, and lacks underfur, though the mane remains large.

In winter, the coat is usually of a dirty-brownish grey or dirty grey colour. The hairs of the mane are light grey or white at the base, and black or dark brown at the tips. The muzzle is dark, greyish brown, brownish-grey or black, while the top of the head and cheeks are more lightly coloured. The ears are almost black. A large black spot is present on the front of the neck, and is separated from the chin by a light zone. A dark field ascends from the flanks ascending to the rear of the cheeks. The inner and outer surface of the forelegs are covered with small dark spots and transverse stripes. The flanks have four indistinct dark vertical stripes and rows of diffused spots. The outer surface of the thighs has 3–4 distinct vertical or oblique dark bands which merge into transverse stripes in the lower portion of the legs. The tip of the tail is black with white underfur.

=== Geographic variation ===
As of 2005, no subspecies are recognised. The striped hyena is nonetheless a geographically varied species. Striped hyenas in the Arabian peninsula have an accentuated blackish dorsal mane, with mid-dorsal hairs reaching 20 cm (7.9 in) in length. The base colour of Arabian hyenas is grey to whitish grey, with dusky grey muzzles and buff yellow below the eyes. Hyenas in Israel have a dorsal crest which is mixed grey and black in colour, rather than being predominantly black. The largest striped hyenas come from the Middle East, Asia Minor, Central and the Indian subcontinent, while those of East Africa and the Arabian peninsula are smaller.

== Distribution and habitat ==
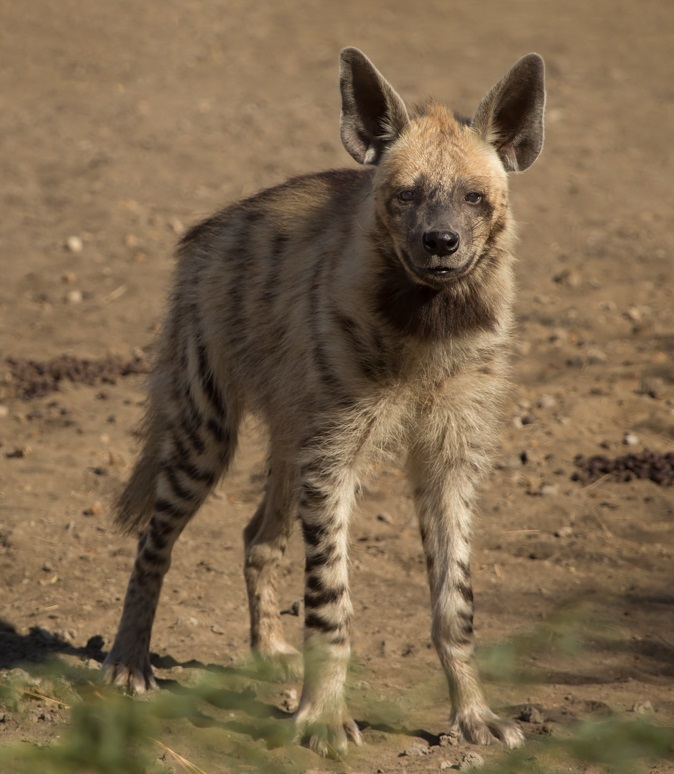
A striped hyena at Blackbuck National Park, India

The striped hyena's historical range encompassed Africa north of and including the Sahel zone, eastern Africa south into Tanzania, the Arabian Peninsula and the Middle East up to the Mediterranean Sea, Turkey, Iraq, the Caucasus (Azerbaijan, Armenia, Georgia), Iran, Turkmenistan, Uzbekistan, Tajikistan, Afghanistan (excluding the higher areas of Hindukush), and the Indian subcontinent. Today the species' distribution is patchy in most ranges, thus indicating that it occurs in many isolated populations, particularly in most of west Africa, most of the Sahara, parts of the Middle East, the Caucasus, and central Asia. It does however have a continuous distribution over large areas of Ethiopia, Kenya, and Tanzania. Its modern distribution in Pakistan, Iran, and Afghanistan is unknown with some sizable large number in India in open areas of Deccan Plateau.

Country	Population	Status	Threats/Protection
Afghanistan	Unknown	Data deficient	Striped hyenas are caught, either for hyena-baiting or for medicinal purposes
Algeria	50–100	Threatened	Although protected by décret no. 83-509, striped hyenas are declining in Algeria due to poaching, forest fires and the disturbance of den sites
Burkina Faso	100-1,000	Data deficient	Burkina Faso's striped hyena population is low but stable, with hunting only being permitted outside national parks and in retaliation to livestock losses
Cameroon	100-1,000	Data deficient	Cameroon's striped hyenas are afforded no protection or special attention outside of national parks and reserves
Caucasus (Armenia, Azerbaijan, Georgia)	150–200	Threatened	Declining in all three countries due to hunting for fur and in retaliation to attacks on humans. Other factors include habitat loss, a reduction in large herbivore populations and changes in livestock management
Chad	Unknown	Data deficient	
Egypt	1,000–2,000	Data deficient	Striped hyenas are offered no protection outside of national parks and reserves, and are hunted and poisoned as pests. There is also a reduced availability of animal carcasses for them to feed on
Ethiopia, Djibouti, Eritrea	Unknown	Lower risk in Ethiopia and data deficient in Eritrea, with no records in Djibouti	Ethiopian hyenas are specially protected under Schedule 5 of the Wildlife Conservation Amendment Regulations (1974), though they may be hunted under special permit for EtBirr 40 (equivalent to US$20) for science, education or zoology
India	1,000–3,000	Data deficient	Although India's hyenas are protected, this is given only within conservation areas, and the population is in decline outside national parks due to poaching, competition with leopards over shelter and diminishing food stocks.
Iran	Unknown	Data deficient	Striped hyenas are protected by law
Iraq	100-1,000	Threatened	Iraqi hyena population is decreasing, though wildlife laws regulate their hunting
Israel	100–170	Threatened	Although hyenas have largely recovered from the strychnine poisoning campaigns of 1918–1948, and are protected by law, the current nature reserves housing them may be too small to ensure a viable population. Road accidents are their most serious threat
Jordan	Unknown	Threatened	Hyenas are actively hunted, as they are considered threats to human life.
Kenya	1,000–2,000	Lower risk	Striped hyenas are likely to decrease in Kenya because of accelerated habitat destruction and poaching.
Kuwait	0	Probably extinct	
Lebanon	4,000-4,500	low risk	The striped hyena is protected by law and culture they thrive in Lebanon's rich biomes risk of extinction is low but recognition is a must
Libya	Unknown	Data deficient	
Mali	Unknown	Data deficient	
Mauritania	Unknown	Data deficient	
Morocco	50–500	Threatened	Though protected by law, the hyena population is in drastic decline, with the remaining individuals now having withdrawn to the southern mountains
Nepal	10–50	Data deficient	Although a small population of hyenas is confirmed, it is not considered a priority for protection by the government outside of national parks and reserves
Niger	100–500	Threatened	Declining due to officially sanctioned hunting and persecution campaigns, as well as habitat loss and overgrazing
Nigeria	Unknown	Threatened	
Oman	100-1,000	Threatened	Although not protected, striped hyenas are not officially persecuted, and are considered useful scavengers
Pakistan	Unknown	Data deficient	Hyaena hyaena is included in the Convention on International Trade in Endangered Species of Wild Fauna and Flora (CITES) Appendix III by request of Pakistan
Saudi Arabia	100-1,000	Threatened	Though not officially persecuted, Arabian hyenas are not offered protection outside of national parks and reserves, and are severely poached
Senegal	50–100	Threatened	
Somalia	Unknown	Data deficient	
Sudan	Unknown	Data deficient	
Syria	Unknown	Data deficient	
Tajikistan	Unknown	Threatened	
Tanzania	Unknown	Data deficient	Striped hyenas can be hunted, though they are not usually a target species. Roadkills are the most frequently recorded cause of mortality
Tunisia	Unknown	Data deficient	
Turkey	Small isolated populations	Threatened	
Turkmenistan	100–500	Threatened	Declining from hunting, though listed in the Red Data Book of Turkmenia
United Arab Emirates	Unknown	Data defictient	
Uzbekistan	25–100	Threatened	Striped hyena populations have declined over decades from active hunting and habitat loss, though they are listed in the Red Data Book of Uzbekistan and are protected
Western Sahara	Unknown	Data deficient	
Yemen	Unknown	Data deficient	

== Behaviour and ecology ==
=== Social and territorial behaviour ===
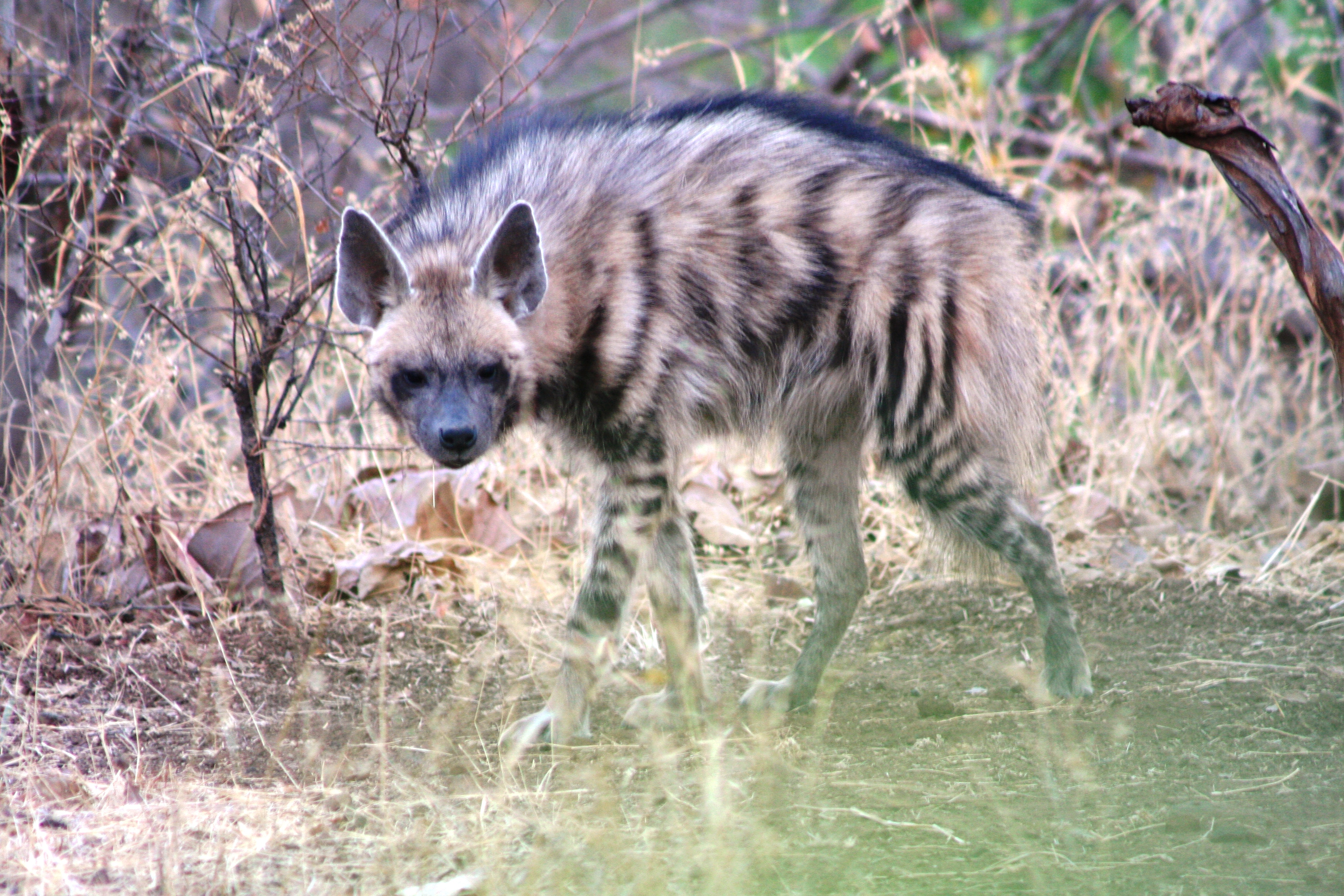
Striped hyena in Gir National Park, India

The striped hyena is a primarily nocturnal animal, which typically only leaves its den at the onset of total darkness, returning before sunrise. Striped hyenas typically live alone or in pairs, though groups of up to seven animals are known in Libya. They are generally not territorial, with home ranges of different groups often overlapping each other. Home ranges in the Serengeti have been recorded to be 44–72 km^{2} (17–28 sq mi), while one in the Negev was calculated at 61 km^{2} (24 sq mi).

When marking their territory, striped hyenas use the paste of their anal pouch called hyena butter to scent mark grass, stalks, stones, tree trunks, and other objects. The composition of hyena butter differs based on the individual’s age and population of origin, and is partly determined by the fermentative bacterial composition of the hyena’s scent pouch, which include many anaerobic bacteria in the phylum Bacillota (also called Firmicutes). While the composition of juvenile scent pouch bacteria is variable, adult striped hyenas have more uniform bacterial communities in their scent pouches, with specific types and amounts of each taxon present.

In aggressive encounters, the black patch near the thoracic and lumbar vertebrae is erected. When fighting, striped hyenas will bite at the throat and legs, but avoid the mane, which serves as a signaling device. When greeting each other, they lick the mid-back region, sniff each other's noses, extrude their anal pouch, or paw each other's throats. The species is not as vocal as the spotted hyena, its vocalisations being limited to a chattering laugh and howling.

=== Reproduction and development ===
The striped hyena is monogamous, with the male establishing the den with the female, helping her raise and feed when cubs are born. The mating season varies according to location; in Transcaucasia, striped hyenas breed in January–February, while those in southeast Turkmenia breed in October–November. In captivity, breeding is non-seasonal. Mating can occur at any time of the day, during which the male grips the skin of the female's neck.

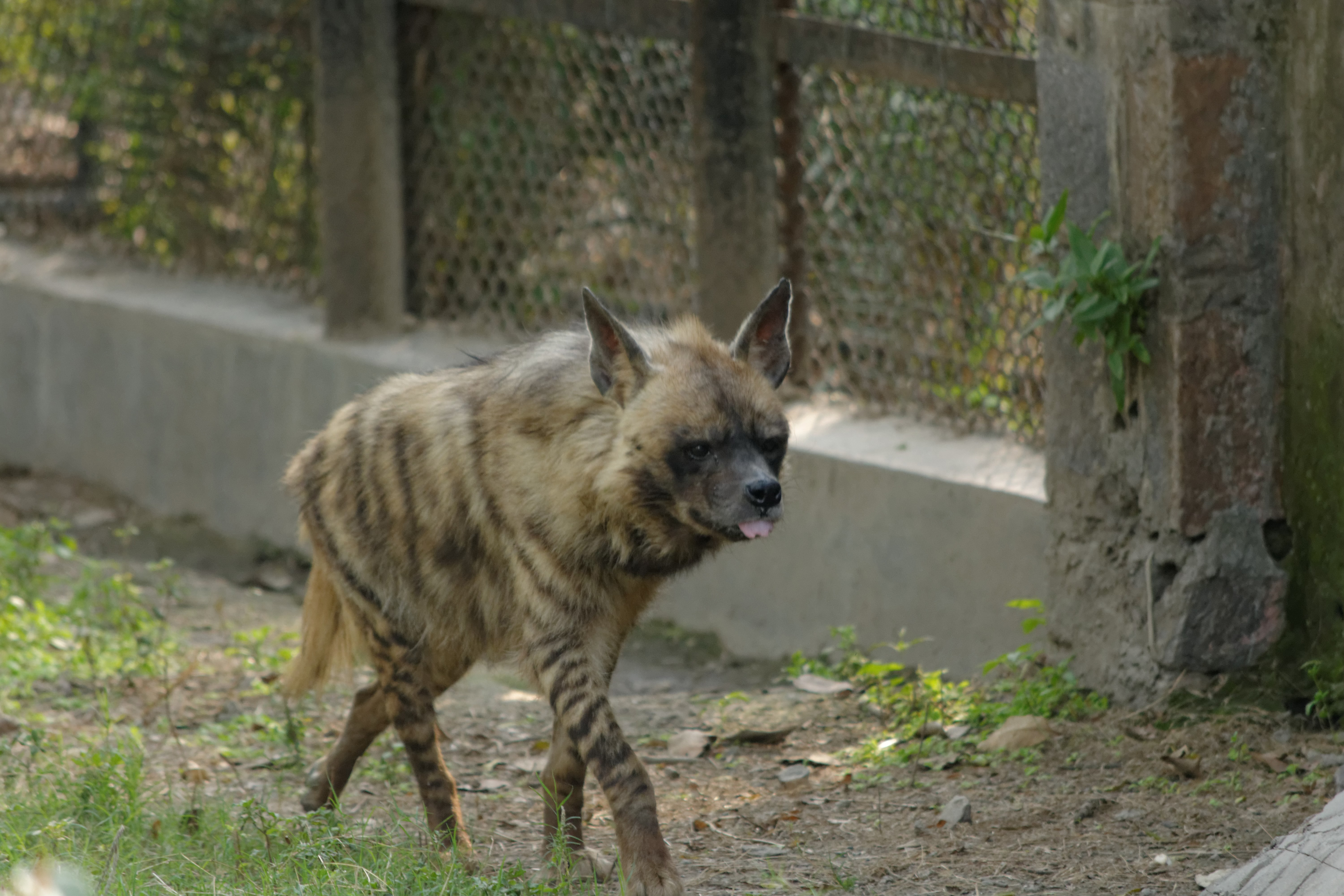
A captive striped hyena at the Delhi Zoo

The gestation period lasts 90–91 days. Striped hyena cubs are born with adult markings, closed eyes, and small ears. This is in marked contrast to newborn spotted hyena cubs which are born almost fully developed, though with black, unmarked coats. Their eyes open after 7–8 days, and the cubs leave their dens after one month. Cubs are weaned at the age of 2 months, and are then fed by both parents. By autumn, the cubs are half the size of their parents. In the wild, striped hyenas can live for 12 years, while in captivity they have been known to reach 23.

=== Burrowing behaviour ===
The striped hyena may dig its own dens, but it also establishes its lairs in caves, rock fissures, erosion channels, and burrows formerly occupied by porcupines, wolves, warthogs, and aardvarks. Hyena dens can be identified by the presence of bones at their entrances. The striped hyena hides in caves, niches, pits, dense thickets, reeds, and plume grass during the day to shelter from predators, heat, or winter cold. The size and elaboration of striped hyena dens varies according to location. Dens in the Karakum have entrances 0.67–0.72 m wide and are extended over a distance of 4.15–5 m, with no lateral extensions or special chambers. In contrast, hyena dens in Israel are much more elaborate and large, exceeding 27 m in length.

=== Diet ===
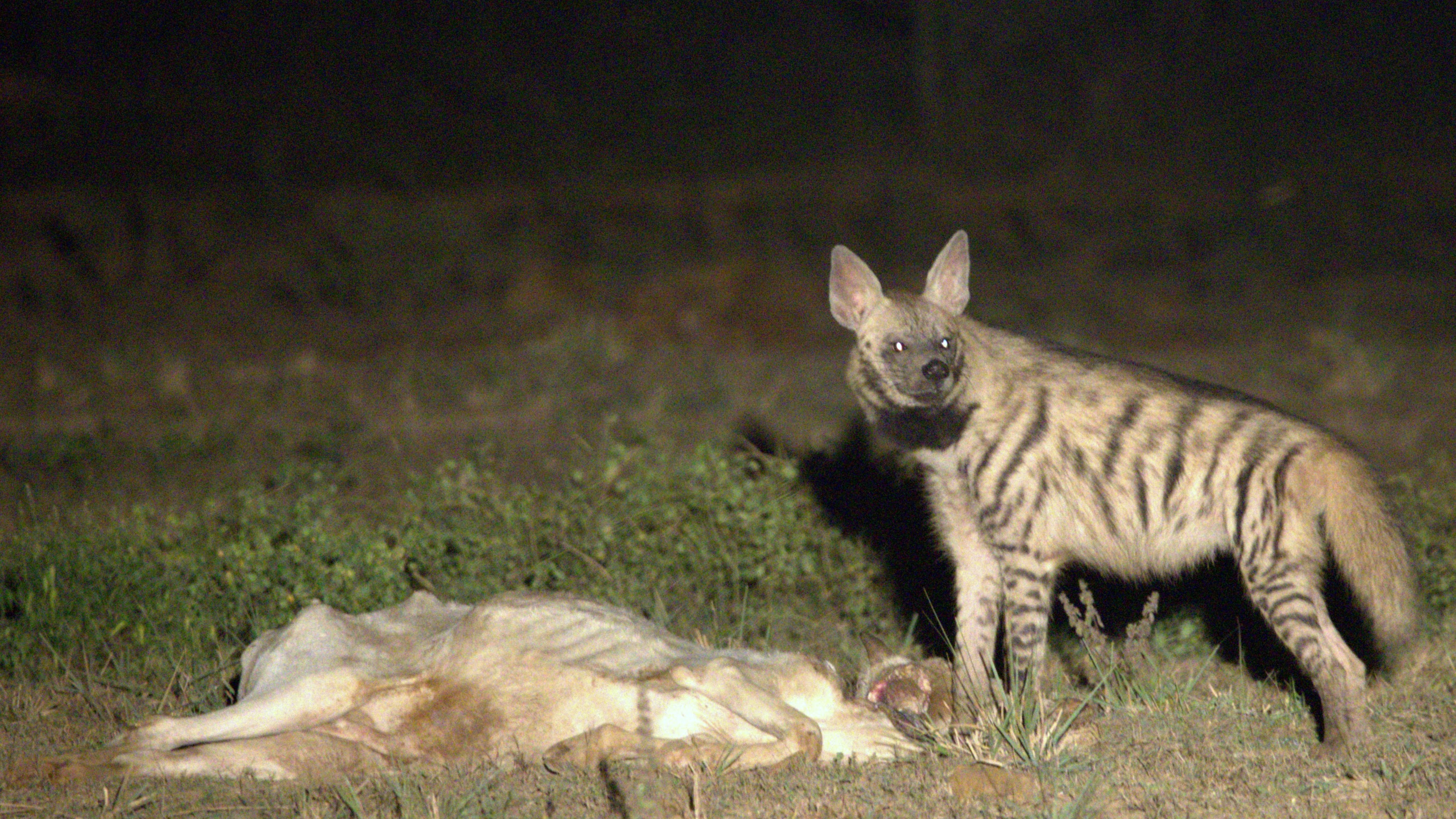
Striped hyena scavenging in Mirzapur forest division, India

The striped hyena is primarily a scavenger which feeds mainly on ungulate (such as zebra, wildebeest, gazelle and impala) carcasses in different stages of decomposition, fresh bones, cartilages, ligaments, and bone marrow. It crushes long bones into fine particles and swallows them, though sometimes entire bones are eaten whole. The striped hyena is not a fussy eater, though it has an aversion to vulture flesh. It will occasionally attack and kill any animal it can overcome, like hare, rodents, reptiles and birds. It hunts prey by running it down, grabbing its flanks or groin and inflicting mortal wounds by tearing out the viscera. In Turkmenistan, the species is recorded to feed on wild boar, kulan, porcupines, and tortoises. A seasonal abundance of oil willow fruits is an important food source in Uzbekistan and Tajikistan, while in the Caucasus, it is grasshoppers. In Israel, the striped hyena feeds on garbage, carrion, and fruits. In eastern Jordan, its main sources of food are feral horse and water buffalo carcasses and village refuse. It has been suggested that only the large hyenas of the Middle East, Asia minor, central Asia, and the Indian subcontinent attack large prey, with no evidence of the smaller Arabian and east African populations doing so. Because of its scavenging diet, the striped hyena requires more water to survive than most other carnivores. When eating, the striped hyena gorges itself until satisfied, though hyenas with cubs will transport food to their dens. Because of the high content of calcium in its diet, the feces of the striped hyena becomes white very rapidly, and can be visible from long distances.

=== Relationships with other predators ===
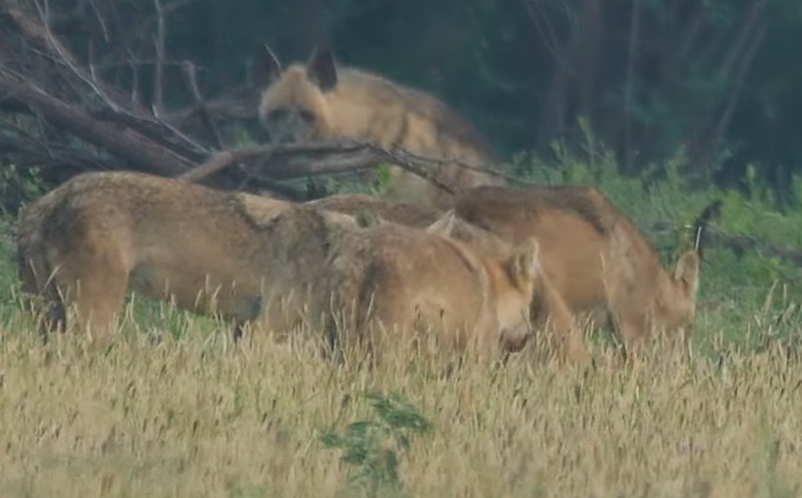
Striped hyena observing wolves consuming a blackbuck carcass

The striped hyena competes with the grey wolf in the Middle East and central Asia. In the latter area, a great portion of the hyena's diet stems from wolf-killed carcasses. In Israel the striped hyena is dominant over the wolf on a one-to-one basis, though wolves in packs can displace single hyenas from carcasses. Both species have been known to share dens on occasion. Rarely, striped hyenas have been known to travel with and live amongst wolf packs, with each species doing the other no harm. Both predators may benefit from this unusual alliance, as the hyenas have better senses of smell and greater strength, and the wolves may be better at tracking large prey.

Red foxes may compete with striped hyenas on large carcasses. Red foxes may give way to hyenas on unopened carcasses, as the latter's stronger jaws can easily tear open flesh which is too tough for foxes. Foxes may harass hyenas, using their smaller size and greater speed to avoid the hyena's attacks. Sometimes, foxes seem to deliberately torment hyenas even when there is no food at stake. Some foxes may mistime their attacks, and are killed.

The species frequently scavenges from the kills of felids such as tigers, leopards, cheetahs, and caracals. A caracal can drive a subadult hyena from a carcass. The hyena usually wins in one-to-one disputes over carcasses with leopards, cheetahs, and tiger cubs, but is dominated by adult tigers. In addition, the striped hyena is sympatric with the Asiatic lion in Gir Forest National Park, and the sloth bear in Balaram Ambaji Wildlife Sanctuary, in the Indian State of Gujarat.

== In culture ==
=== In folklore, religion, and mythology ===
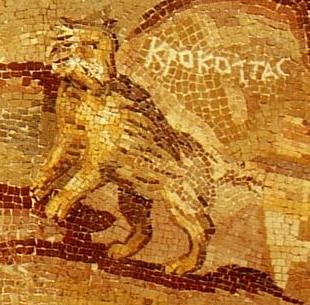
A striped hyena, as depicted on the Nile mosaic of Palestrina.

Striped hyenas are frequently referenced in Middle Eastern literature and folklore, typically as symbols of treachery and stupidity. In the Near and Middle East, striped hyenas are generally regarded as physical incarnations of jinn. Zakariya al-Qazwini (1204–1283) wrote in Arabic of a tribe of people called "Hyena People." In his book Marvels of Creatures and the Strange Things Existing (عجائب المخلوقات وغرائب الموجودات), he wrote that should one of this tribe be in a group of 1,000 people, a hyena could pick him out and eat him. A Persian medical treatise written in 1376 tells how to cure cannibalistic people known as kaftar who are said to be "half-man, half-hyena". Al-Doumairy in his writings in Hawayan Al-Koubra (1406) wrote that striped hyenas were vampiric creatures that attacked people at night and sucked the blood from their necks. He also wrote that hyenas only attacked brave people. Arab folklore tells of how hyenas can mesmerize victims with their eyes or sometimes with their pheromones. Until the end of the 19th century, the Greeks believed that the bodies of werewolves, if not destroyed, would haunt battlefields as vampiric hyenas which drank the blood of dying soldiers. The image of striped hyenas in Afghanistan, India, Pakistan and Palestine is more varied. Though feared, striped hyenas were also symbolic of love and fertility, leading to numerous varieties of love medicine derived from hyena body parts. Among the Baloch people, witches or magicians are said to ride striped hyenas at night.

The Arabic word for striped hyenas is alluded in a valley in Israel known as Shaqq al-Diba (meaning "cleft of the hyenas") and Wadi Abu Diba (meaning "valley of the hyenas"). Both places have been interpreted by some scholars as being the Biblical Valley of Zeboim mentioned in 1 Samuel 13:18. The Hebrew word for hyena is צָבוֹעַ ṣāḇốaʿ, which is cognate with Arabic ضَبُع ḍabuʕ , both from Proto-Semitic *ṣ̂VbVˁ. This word is also interpreted as meaning literally means "colored creature" (compare צָבוּעַ ṣāḇūa‘, passive participle of לִצְבֹּעַ liṣboaʿ "to color, to paint, to dye", which - if related to Arabic صَبَغَ ṣabaḡa "to dip, to dye, to color, to tincture" - would be from another root - *ṣbγ - and hence unrelated to צָבוֹעַ ṣāḇốaʿ and ضَبُع ḍabuʕ "hyena"). In Jeremiah 12:9, the phrase הַעַיִט צָבוּעַ ha‘ayiṭ ṣāḇūa‘ is translated by the King James Version's translators as "a speckled bird" (compare the translation "a speckled bird of prey" in the 1917 JPS version), Henry Baker Tristram argued that it was most likely a hyena being mentioned.

In Gnosticism, the Archon Astaphaios is depicted with a hyænid face.

=== Predation on livestock and crops ===
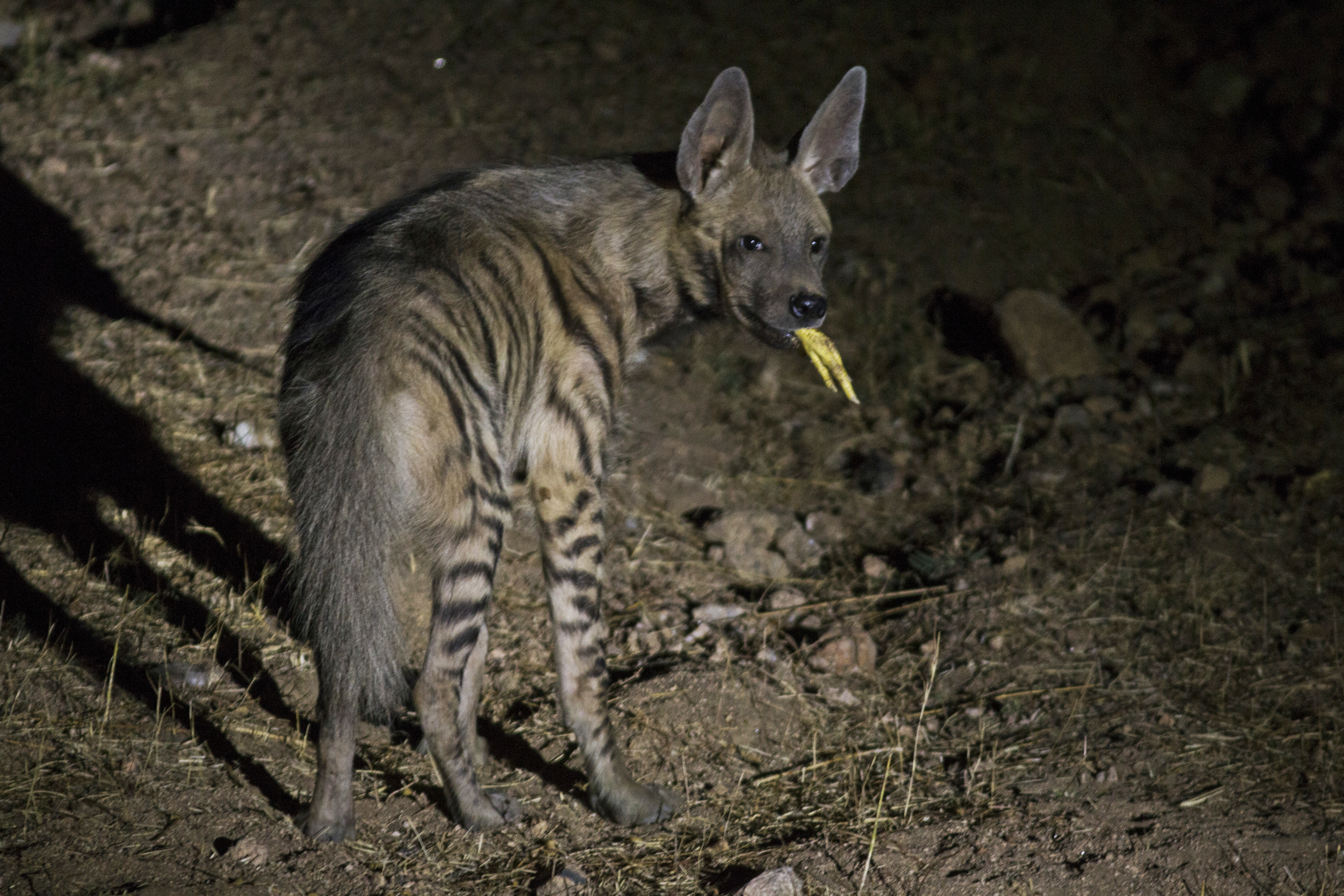
Striped hyena scavenging on poultry waste in Dahod district, Gujarat, India

The striped hyena is sometimes implicated in the killing of livestock, particularly goats, sheep, dogs and poultry. Larger stock is sometimes reportedly taken, though it is possible that these are cases of scavenging being mistaken for actual predation. Although most attacks occur at low densities, a substantial number reputedly occur in Egypt, Ethiopia, India, Iraq, and possibly Morocco.

In Turkmenistan, striped hyenas kill dogs, while they also kill sheep and other small animals in the Caucasus; there were even reports that striped hyenas have killed horses and donkeys in Iraq during the mid-twentieth century. Sheep, dogs, horses, and goats are also preyed upon in North Africa, Israel, Iran, Pakistan, and India.

Striped hyenas also cause damage on occasion to melon fields and to date palms in date plantations in Israel and Egypt, and to plantations of watermelons and plantations of honey melons in Turkmenistan.

=== Attacks on humans and grave desecration ===
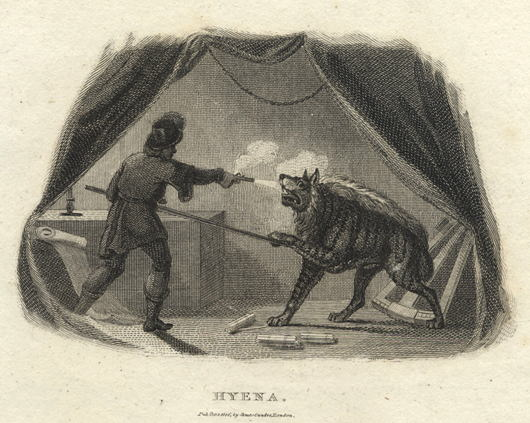
Engraving of a striped hyena attacking a man in The Naturalist's Cabinet (1806)

In ordinary circumstances, striped hyenas are extremely timid around humans, though they may show bold behaviours toward people at night. On rare occasions, striped hyenas have preyed on humans. In the 1880s, a hyena was reported to have attacked humans, especially sleeping children, over a three-year period in the Erivan Governorate, with 25 children and 3 adults being wounded in one year. The attacks provoked local authorities into announcing a reward of 100 rubles for every hyena killed. Further attacks were reported later in some parts of Transcaucasia, particularly in 1908. Instances are known in Azerbaijan of striped hyenas killing children sleeping in courtyards during the 1930s and 1940s. In 1942, a guard sleeping in his hut was mauled by a hyena in Golyndzhakh. Cases of children being taken by hyenas by night are known in southeast Turkmenistan's Bathyz Nature Reserve. A further attack on a child was reported around Serakhs in 1948. Several attacks have occurred in India; in 1962, nine children were thought to have been taken by hyenas in the town of Bhagalpur in the Bihar State in a six-week period and 19 children up to the age of four were killed by hyenas in Karnataka and Bihar in 1974. A census on wild animal attacks during a five-year period in the Indian state of Madhya Pradesh showed that hyenas had only attacked three people, the lowest figure when compared to deaths caused by wolves, gaur, boar, elephants, tigers, leopards, and sloth bears.

Though attacks on live humans are rare, striped hyenas will scavenge on human corpses. In Turkey, stones are placed on graves to stop hyenas digging the bodies out. In World War I, the Turks imposed conscription (safar barlek) on Lebanon; people escaping from the conscription fled north, where many died and were subsequently eaten by hyenas.

=== Hunting ===
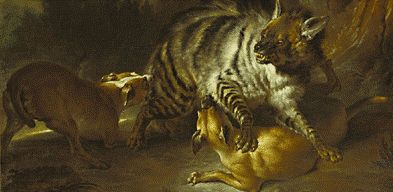
Hyena (1739) by Jean-Baptiste Oudry.

Striped hyenas were hunted by Ancient Egyptian peasants for duty and amusement along with other animals that were a threat to crops and livestock. Algerian hunters historically considered the killing of striped hyenas as beneath their dignity, due to the animal's reputation for cowardice. A similar attitude was held by British sportsmen in British India. Although striped hyenas are capable of quickly killing a dog with a single bite, they usually feign death when escape from hunting dogs is impossible, and will remain in this state for long periods, even when badly bitten. On some rare occasions, hyenas were ridden down and speared by men on horseback. Although hyenas were generally not fast enough to outrun horses, they had the habit of doubling and turning frequently during chases, thus ensuring long pursuits. Generally though, hyenas were hunted more as pests than sporting quarries. Their scavenging damages skulls, skins and other articles from hunter's camps, which made them unpopular among sportsmen. In the Soviet Union, hyena hunting was not specially organised. Most hyenas were caught incidentally in traps meant for other animals. Some hunters in southern Punjab, Kandahar, and Quetta, catch striped hyenas to use them in hyena-baiting. The hyenas are pitted against specially trained dogs, and are restrained with ropes in order to pull them away from the dogs if necessary. In Kandahar, hunters locally called payloch (naked foot) hunt striped hyenas by entering their dens naked with a noose in hand. When the hyena is cornered at the end of its lair, the hunter murmurs the magic formula "turn into dust, turn into stone," which causes the animal to enter a hypnotic state of total submission, by which point the hunter can slip a noose over its forelegs and, finally, drag it out of the cave. A similar method was once practised by Mesopotamian Arab hunters, who would enter hyena dens and "flatter" the animal, which they believed could understand Arabic. The hunter would murmur "you are very nice and pretty and quite like a lion; indeed, you are a lion". The hyena would then allow the hunter to place a noose around its neck and pose no resistance on being dragged out of its lair.

The fur is coarse and sparse, with the few skins sold by hunters often being marketed as poor quality dog or wolf fur. Hyena skins were however once used in preparing chamois leather. The selling price of hyena pelts in the Soviet Union ranged from 45 kopeks to 1 ruble, 80 kopeks.

=== Striped hyenas as food ===
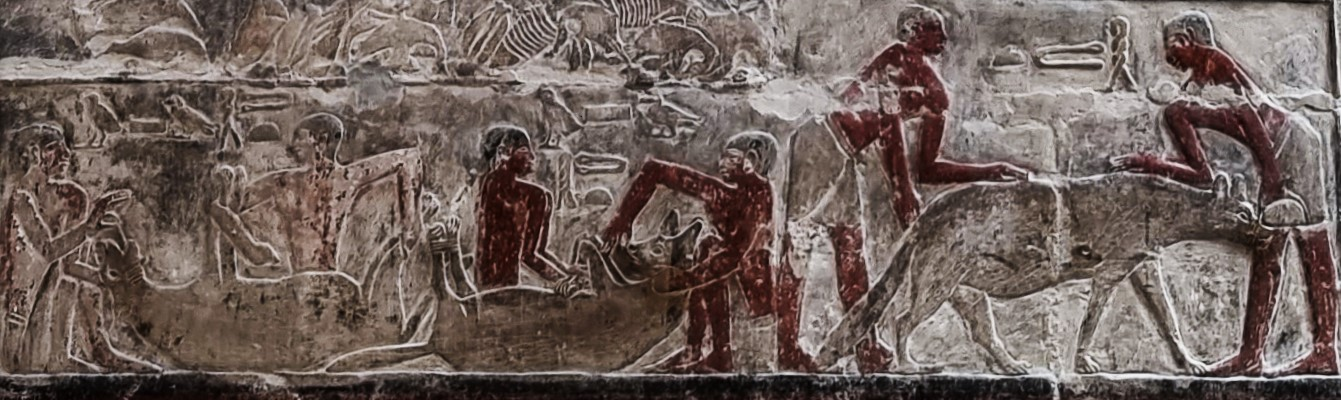
Relief of striped hyenas being force-fed at the tomb of Mereruka

A mural depicted on Mereruka's tomb in Sakkara indicates that Old Kingdom Egyptians forcefed hyenas in order to fatten them up for food, though archaeologist Burchard Brentjes argued that the depicted animals represent an extinct population of Egyptian aardwolves. European writers in the 19th and early 20th centuries recorded that striped hyenas were eaten by some Egyptian peasants, Arabian Bedouins, Palestinian laborers, Sinai Bedouins, Tuaregs, and in Somalia. Among some Bedouins of Arabia at the beginning of the 20th century, hyena meat was generally considered medicine, rather than food.

=== Striped hyenas in folk magic ===
The Ancient Greeks and Romans believed the blood, excrement, rectum, genitalia, eyes, tongue, hair, skin, and fat, as well as the ash of different parts of the striped hyena's body, were effective means to ward off evil and to ensure love and fertility. The Greeks and Romans believed that the genitalia of a hyena "would hold a couple peaceably together" and that a hyena anus worn as an amulet on the upper arm would make its male possessor irresistible to women.

In West and South Asia, hyena body parts apparently play an important role in love magic and in the making of amulets. In Iranian folklore, it is mentioned that a stone found in the hyenas body can serve as a charm of protection for whoever wears it on his upper arm. In the Pakistani province of Sindh, the local Muslims place the tooth of a striped hyena over churns in order not to lose the milk's baraka. In Iran, a dried striped hyena pelt is considered a potent charm which forces all to succumb to the possessors attraction. In Afghanistan and Pakistan striped hyena hair is used either in love magic or as a charm in sickness. Hyena blood has been held in high regard in northern India as potent medicine, and the eating of the tongue helps fight tumors. In the Khyber area, burned striped hyena fat is applied to a man's genitals or sometimes taken orally to ensure virility, while in India the fat serves as a cure for rheumatism. In Afghanistan, some mullahs wear the vulva (kus) of a female striped hyena wrapped in silk under their armpits for a week. If a man peers through the vulva at the woman of his desire, he will invariably get hold of her. This has led to the proverbial expression in Dari of kus-e kaftar bay, as well as in Pashto of kus-e kaftar which literally mean "it happens as smoothly as if you would look through the vulva of a female striped hyena". In the North-West Frontier Province and Baluchistan, the Pakhtun keep the vulva in vermilion powder, itself having aphrodesic connotations. The rectum of a freshly killed striped hyena is likewise used by homosexuals and bisexuals to attract young men. This has led to the expression "to possess the anus of a [striped] hyena" which denotes somebody who is attractive and has many lovers. A striped hyena's penis kept in a small box filled with vermilion powder can be used for the same reasons.

=== Tameability ===
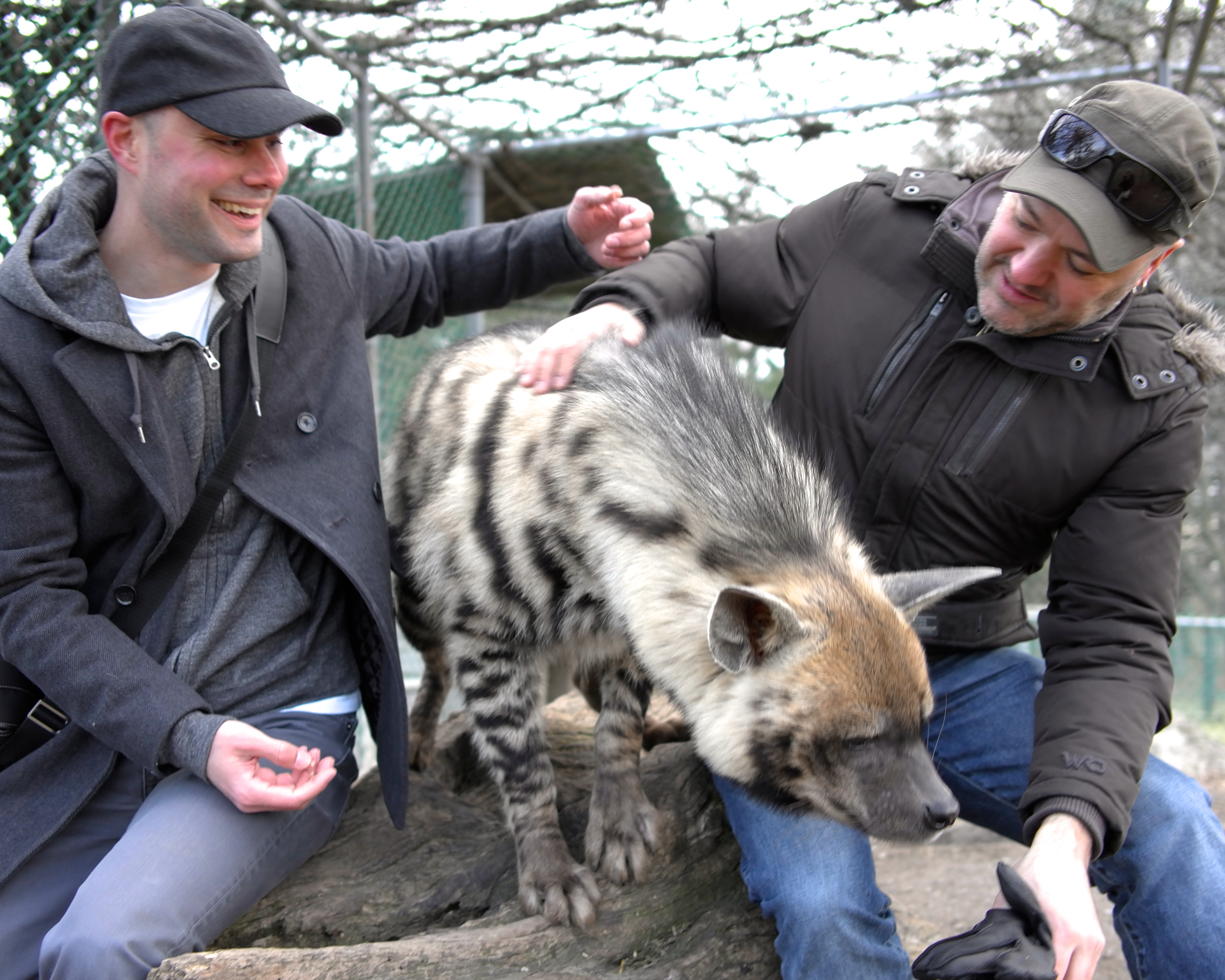
A tame striped hyena.

The striped hyena is easily tamed and can be fully trained, particularly when they are young. Although the Ancient Egyptians did not consider striped hyenas sacred, they did supposedly tame them for use in hunting. When they are raised with a firm hand, they may eventually become affectionate and as amenable as well-trained dogs, though they emit a strong odour which no amount of bathing will cover. Although they kill dogs in the wild, striped hyenas raised in captivity can form bonds with them.

== Bibliography ==
- Heptner, V. G.; Sludskii, A. A. (1992). Mammals of the Soviet Union: Carnivora (hyaenas and cats), Volume 2. Smithsonian Institution Libraries and National Science Foundation.
- Kurtén, Björn (1968). Pleistocene mammals of Europe. Weidenfeld and Nicolson.
- Mills, G. & Hofer, H. (1998). "Striped hyaena: country accounts" (PDF). Hyaenas: status survey and conservation action plan. Gland: IUCN/SSC Hyena Specialist Group. pp. 68–71. ISBN 2-8317-0442-1.
- Osborn, D.. J.; Helmy, I. (1980). The contemporary land mammals of Egypt (including Sinai). Field Museum of Natural History.
- Pocock, R. I. (1941). The Fauna of British India. Vol. 2 Mammals. London: Taylor and Francis.
- Rosevear, D. R. (1974). The carnivores of West Africa. London: Trustees of the British Museum (Natural History). ISBN 0-565-00723-8.
