= Windmill Hill Batteries =

Artillery batteries in Gibraltar

Windmill Hill Battery
- Part of Fortifications of Gibraltar
- Gibraltar

Site information
- Type: Artillery battery

Location
- Location in Gibraltar
- Coordinates: 36.113038°N 5.347016°W

The Windmill Hill Batteries are a series of artillery batteries situated on Windmill Hill, Gibraltar near the south of the peninsula. They are part of the fortifications of Gibraltar. The batteries were originally established by Lt General Edward Cornwallis during his governorship of Gibraltar between 1762–77, built on the site of the old windmills after which the hill was named. The singular Windmill Hill Battery refers to one particular battery almost equidistant between Genista Battery and Europa Advance Battery.

The armament of the batteries changed frequently as artillery technology evolved. They lined the escarpment of Windmill Hill, a plateau overlooking the lower ground of Europa Point. The flatness and relative inaccessibility of Windmill Hill made it an ideal place to position artillery to repel attacks coming from the Atlantic or Mediterranean sides of Gibraltar, or to enfilade an amphibious landing.

In 1865, a naming system for the batteries was adopted that saw each of their emplacements described by a letter, from Emplacement A on the west end near Detention Barracks to Emplacement R on the east side by the Retrenched Barracks. The installation of four 6-inch quick-firing guns with a range of 10,000 yards (9,100 m) bearing on Spanish land batteries was proposed in 1901, with another four to be installed on the Mediterranean side. During the Second World War, four 3.7-inch anti-aircraft guns were installed on the batteries and two 9.2-inch howitzers were mounted on Emplacement F.

The batteries are still mostly intact, though some were built upon later and their names altered.

== Bibliography ==
- Hughes, Quentin; Migos, Athanassios (1995). Strong as the Rock of Gibraltar. Gibraltar: Exchange Publications. OCLC 48491998.
- Fa, Darren & Finlayson Clive (2006). The fortifications of Gibraltar : 1068-1945 (1. publ. in Great Britain. ed.). Oxford [u.a.]: Osprey. ISBN 9781846030161.
