= Meryteti =

Ancient Egyptian vizier

- Vizier of Egypt
- Tenure: c. 2330 BC
- Pharaoh: Pepi I
- Father: Mereruka
- Mother: Seshseshet Waatetkhethor
- Wife: Nebet
- Children: Ihyemsaef (or Ihy); Niankhmin
- Burial: Mastaba of Mereruka, Saqqara, Egypt

Meryteti ("loved by Teti"; fl. c. 2330 BC) served as vizier of Pepi I during the Sixth Dynasty of Egypt. He was the son of the vizier Mereruka. His mother was the royal daughter Seshseshet Waatetkhethor, daughter of Teti. He was thus a nephew of the king Pepi I.

== Tomb ==
Meryteti was buried in the mastaba of his father Mereruka. This tomb was divided into three sections. The largest part of the mastaba was made for Mereruka, another section belonged to Mereruka's mother, while the third part belonged to Meryteti. The burial shaft of Meryteti is located in the north-west corner of Mereruka's tomb. His section of the tomb depicts his own wife, Nebet, and two sons, Ihyemsaef (or Ihy) and Niankhmin.

== Ancestry ==
Ancestors of Meryteti

Mereruka
Nedjetempet
Meryteti
Teti
Sesheshet
Seshseshet Waatetkhethor
