= Retrenched Barracks =

Barracks in Gibraltar

- Part of Fortifications of Gibraltar
- Windmill Hill in Gibraltar

Site information
- Type: Barracks
- Owner: Government of Gibraltar
- Open to the public: No
- Condition: Converted into facilities for clubs and associations

Location
- Location within Gibraltar
- Coordinates: 36.118433°N 5.344812°W

Site history
- Built: 1841
- Built by: UK Ministry of Defence
- Materials: Limestone

The Retrenched Barracks was a fortified barracks located at Windmill Hill in the British Overseas Territory of Gibraltar. It stands to the north of the southern tip of Gibraltar, Europa Point, which was long felt to be potentially vulnerable to a surprise attack from the sea and was heavily fortified with gun batteries, perimeter walls and scarped cliffs.

In 1841, Major General Sir John Thomas Jones recommended in a report on Gibraltar's fortifications that a line of retrenchments should be built at the head of Windmill Hill to block an invader's line of advance from Europa Point up the peninsula. The hill provided a formidable defensive position which enfiladed the road from Europa; as Jones put it, "Two hundred men on Windmill Hill and Europa Pass ought to hold as many thousands at bay."

The barracks, which Jones himself designed, was originally intended to be accompanied by a citadel which would serve as a central rallying point. This, however, proved too expensive and was never built. In its final form, the barracks consisted of two demi-bastions, joined by a curtain wall behind which the main barracks block is located. Four gun embrasures were built on the right demi-bastion and one on the left flank, providing a defence from naval bombardment, while the top of the wall is loopholed to accommodate rifles along almost all of its length. The barracks block is constructed of white limestone quarried locally and stands two stories high with a basement. Its external elevation has a bold and simple design, with each bay having one arched window on the ground floor and two plain windows above on the first floor.
