= Edward VII Battery =

Artillery battery in Gibraltar

- Part of Fortifications of Gibraltar
- Windmill Hill, Gibraltar
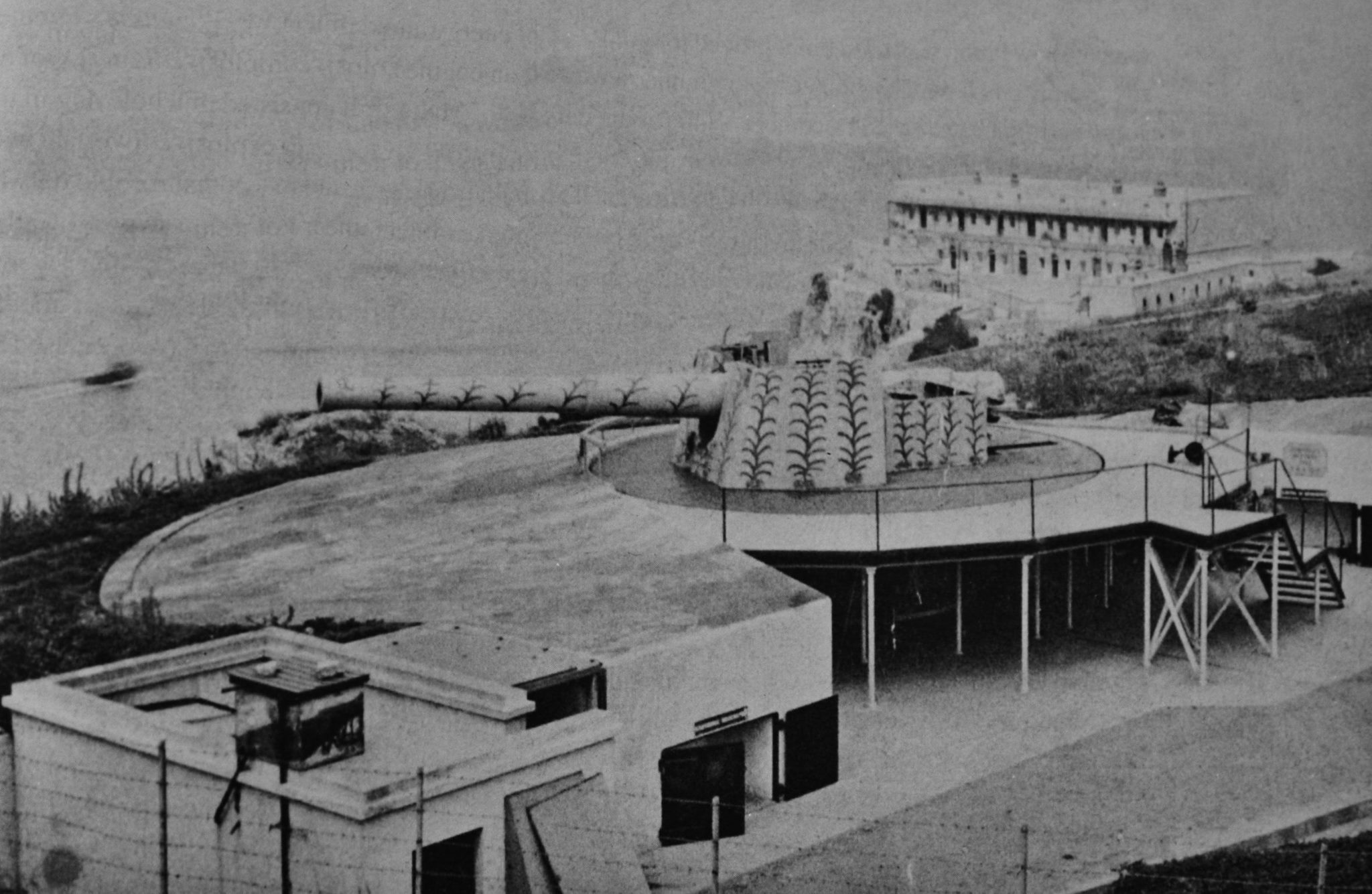
- Edward VII Battery showing one of its two 9.2 inch breech-loader

Site information
- Type: Artillery battery
- Owner: Ministry of Defence
- Controlled by: Ministry of Defence
- Open to the public: No

Location
- Location in Gibraltar
- Coordinates: 36.116201°N 5.347323°W

Garrison information
- Garrison: Royal Gibraltar Regiment

Edward VII Battery was an artillery battery in the British Overseas Territory of Gibraltar.

== Description ==
At the end of the nineteenth century Edward VII Battery had two 9.2-inch (234 mm) guns which were part of fourteen available for long range bombardment. These guns could fire across the Straits of Gibraltar including hitting shipping on the coast of Morocco.
