= Windmill Hill (Gibraltar) =

A pair of plateaux

Coordinates: 36.116002°N 5.345732°W

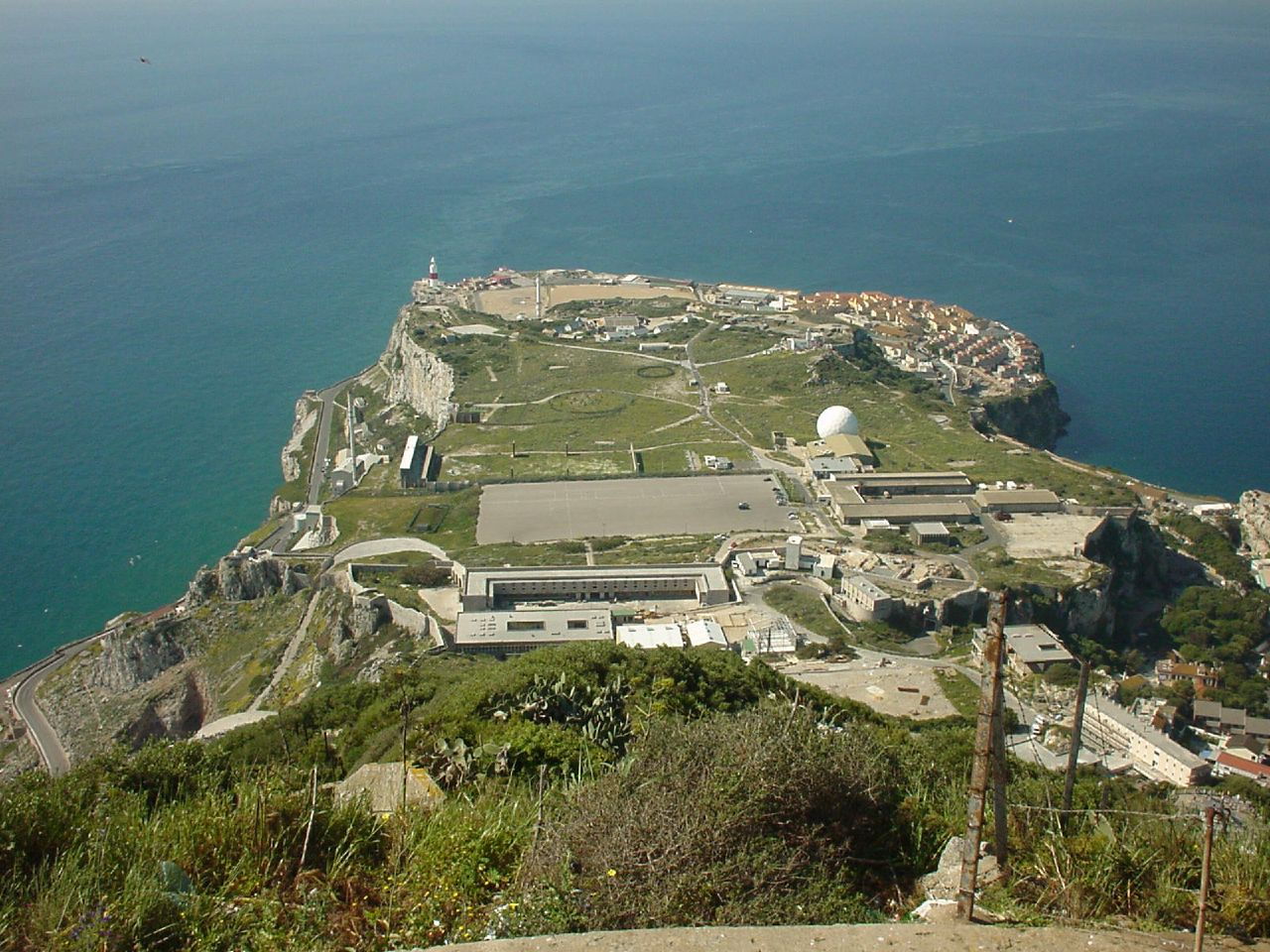
Windmill Hill viewed from the Rock of Gibraltar, looking due south

Windmill Hill or Windmill Hill Flats is one of a pair of plateaux, known collectively as the Southern Plateaux, at the southern end of the British Overseas Territory of Gibraltar. It is located just to the south of the Rock of Gibraltar, which descends steeply to the plateau. Windmill Hill slopes down gently to the south with a height varying from 120 metres (390 ft) at the north end to 90 metres (300 ft) at the south end. It covers an area of about 19 hectares (47 acres), though about 6 hectares (15 acres) at the north end is built over. The plateau is ringed to the south and east with a line of cliffs which descend to the second of the Southern Plateaux, Europa Flats, which is itself ringed by sea cliffs. Both plateaux are the product of marine erosion during the Quaternary period and subsequent tectonic uplift. Windmill Hill was originally on the shoreline and its cliffs were cut by the action of waves, before the ground was uplifted and the shoreline moved further out to the edge of what is now Europa Flats.

== Military usage ==
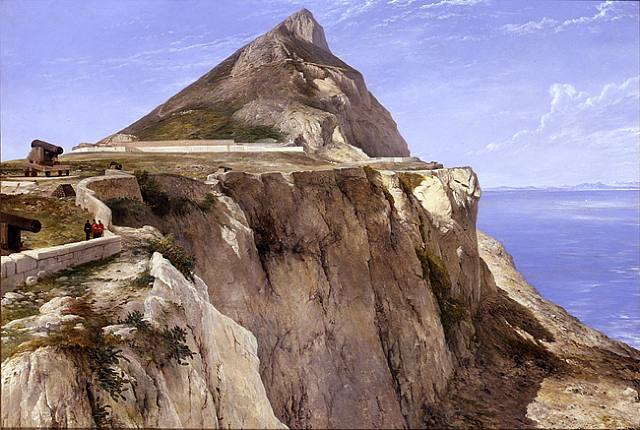
View of Windmill Hill fortifications and the Rock of Gibraltar in 1862

The plateau has had military importance. It was fortified in the 1770s as part of the improvement schemes of Chief Engineer Colonel William Green prior to the Great Siege of Gibraltar. John Drinkwater, who served in Gibraltar during the siege, commented in his History of the Late Siege of Gibraltar that "the retired and inaccessible lines of Windmill Hill have great command, and being situated within musket-shot of the sea, are very formidable, and of great consequence in that quarter."

A series of artillery batteries was constructed there during the 19th century to support the lower-level defences on Europa Flats and to enfilade any potential attackers landing in the area. The batteries included Buffadero Battery, Edward VII Battery, Jews' Cemetery Battery, Levant Battery and Windmill Hill Batteries. The flat terrain of the plateau also lent itself well to accommodating mobile gun sites, between which guns could be moved as required. At the head of the plateau, the Retrenched Barracks provided garrison accommodation and served as a small fortress that could be used to block an enemy's attempt to gain access to the heights of the Rock.

The plateau is the site of Lathbury Barracks, constructed in the early 1960s and used until 1991 by the British Army; it is now owned by the Government of Gibraltar. A NATO communications centre was also built there in the 1970s. The Royal Gibraltar Regiment's Buffadero Training Centre is situated near the barracks and is used by British Army units for a variety of training purposes, including practicing fighting in built-up areas (FIBUA) in a mock-up village. The terrain in the vicinity is similar to that of parts of Afghanistan, consisting of rocky ground covered with thickets of vegetation and shrubbery. This similarity has been used for exercises to prepare British troops for deployment in support of the British war effort in Afghanistan.

Windmill Hill Signal Station remains at the location and utilised by the Royal Navy.

== Civilian usage ==
Windmill Hill lies some way from the main area of settlement in Gibraltar, though in the late 18th century the ruins of Moorish buildings – which would have been at least 350 years old by that time – were still visible on the plateau. The Jewish community of Gibraltar established a cemetery there, known as the Jews' Gate Cemetery, in a "very airy and elevated situation."

In 2010, the Government of Gibraltar established a prison there called HM Prison Windmill Hill. The construction of a civil prison on Windmill Hill had been proposed as long ago as 1854, when prisoners were being incarcerated in the Moorish Castle – a situation which was described as "defective in many points" in an 1867 report but persisted until 2010. The Detention Barracks, a military prison, stood on Windmill Hill for many years and was described by the English traveller Reginald Fowler as "clean, admirably arranged, and the discipline very strict" when he saw it in 1854. It was demolished in 1962.

The government also proposed in 2009 to build a new power station for Gibraltar on the site of the former barracks' parade ground. This raised concerns about the impact on the area's rich variety of wildlife. In March 2012 the newly elected Gibraltar Socialist Labour Party/Liberal alliance government announced that it would not be proceeding with the power station plans on this site.

== Wildlife and caves ==
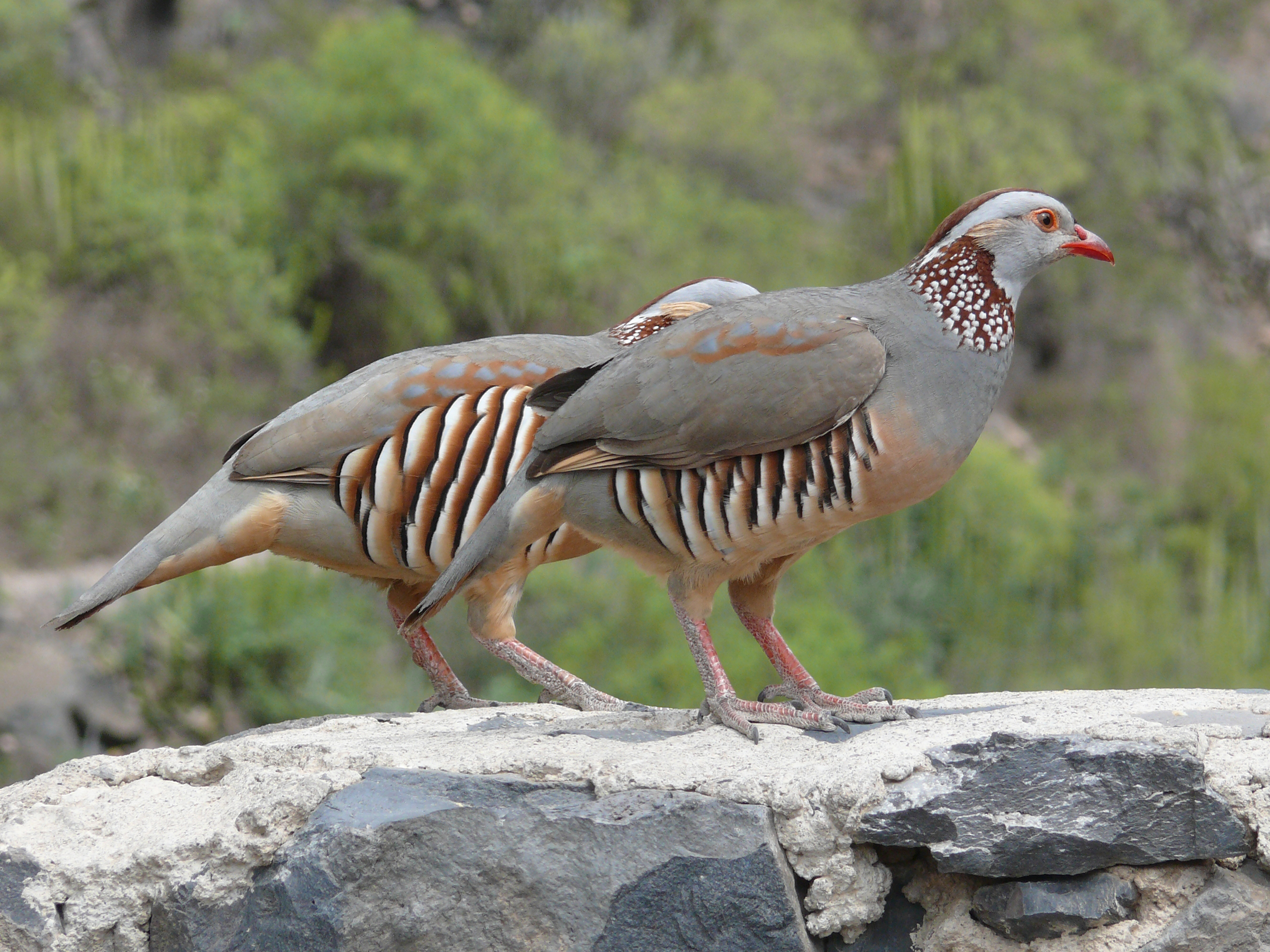
The Barbary partridge, which nests on Windmill Hill

The Windmill Hill area is one of the most important wildlife habitats in Gibraltar and is a Site of Community Importance (SCI) under the European Union Habitats Directive. Although the environment is at first sight rather hostile, with only a thin layer of poor-quality soil overlaying rocks, it supports a wide variety of flora including species which are not found elsewhere in Gibraltar. These include, among others, Salvia verbenaca (wild clary); Echium parviflorum (small-flowered bugloss); Plantago serraria (saw-toothed plantain); Hedysarum coronarium (Italian sainfoin); Mantisalca salmantica; Minuartia geniculata (pink sandwort); Tetragonolobus purpureus (winged asparagus pea); and Lathyrus annuus (annual yellow vetchling). The central area of Windmill Hill is largely open with very sparse ground cover, while peripheral areas are covered in low scrub which stands about 0.75 metres (2 ft 6 in) high on average, rising to a height of up to 2 metres (6 ft 7 in).

Perhaps because of its prominence as the only vegetated area of the southern tip of Gibraltar, Windmill Hill attracts many species of migrating birds which may see it as a focal point on trans-Saharan journeys. It is home to Gibraltar's national bird, the Barbary partridge (Alectoris barbara), which nests in the plateau's open habitat. It is an important waypoint on the route that songbirds take in migrating between Europe and Africa, and is often their first European landfall on crossing the Strait of Gibraltar. Bats also hunt there, feeding on insects.

A number of Gibraltar's caves are located under the hill. The Genista Caves came to light in the 1860s during work to enlarge the military prison, which uncovered partly blocked fissures that, when excavated, revealed the caves. They were explored by Captain Frederick Brome, using convict labour to carry out the excavations, and were named after Brome – Genista is the Latin name for the group of flowering shrubs known as broom, and the name was thus a punning homonym of Brome's own surname. The excavations revealed the bones of a large number of what are now locally extinct animals including lynx, leopard, hyena, rhinoceros and aurochs. They had evidently fallen through fissures in the surface and perished. Unfortunately the cave entrance was later lost or destroyed when a large magazine was built directly overhead at the end of the 19th century.

== Bibliography ==
- Colonial Office (1867). Prison Discipline: Digest and Summary of Answers from Colonial Governors to Circular Despatches Sent Out by the Secretary of State on the 16th and 17th January 1867. London: Colonial Office.
- Drinkwater, John (1786). A History of the Late Siege of Gibraltar, by John Drinkwater. London. OCLC 631054.
- Fa, Darren; Finlayson, Clive (2006). The Fortifications of Gibraltar. Oxford: Osprey Publishing. ISBN 1-84603-016-1.
- Fowler, Reginald (1854). Hither and Thither. London: Frederick R. Daldy.
- Gold, Peter (2012). Gibraltar: British or Spanish?. London: Routledge. ISBN 9781134276745.
- Martin, Robert Montgomery (1837). History of the British possessions in the Mediterranean: volume 5, comprising Gibraltar, Malta, Gozo, and the Ionian islands. Whittaker & co.
- Rose, Edward P.F. (2001). "Military Engineering on the Rock of Gibraltar and its Geoenvironmental Legacy". In Ehlen, Judy; Harmon, Russell S. (eds.). The Environmental Legacy of Military Operations. Boulder, Colorado: Geological Society of America. ISBN 0-8137-4114-9.
- Rose, Edward P.F.; Mather, John D.; Perez, Manuel (2004). "British attempts to develop groundwater and water supply on Gibraltar 1800–1985". In Mather, John D. (ed.). 200 years of British hydrogeology. London: Geological Society. ISBN 9781862391550.
