= Lathbury Barracks =

Ex military barracks

- Part of Fortifications of Gibraltar
- Gibraltar
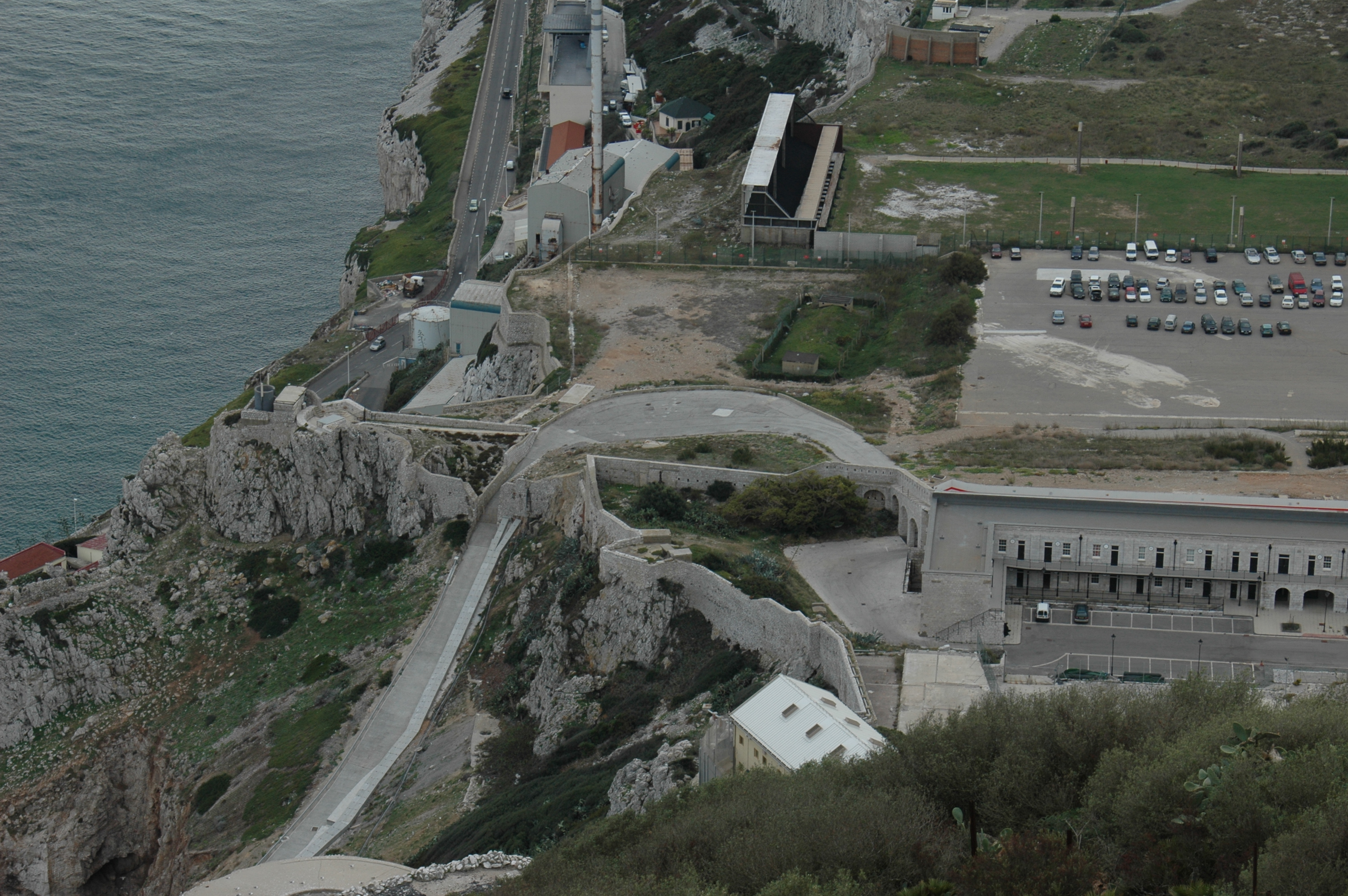
- View south from Spur Battery showing Lathbury Barracks in the bottom left

Site information
- Type: Barracks
- Owner: Government of Gibraltar

Location
- Location within Gibraltar.
- Coordinates: 36.118792°N 5.344905°W

Lathbury Barracks was a military barracks in the British Overseas Territory of Gibraltar that is currently used by civilians. It is located in the southern part of the Rock, south of Spur Battery on Windmill Hill. The last United Kingdom regiment based here was the 3rd Battalion Royal Green Jackets who handed it over to the local Royal Gibraltar Regiment and it is now owned by the Government of Gibraltar.

== History ==
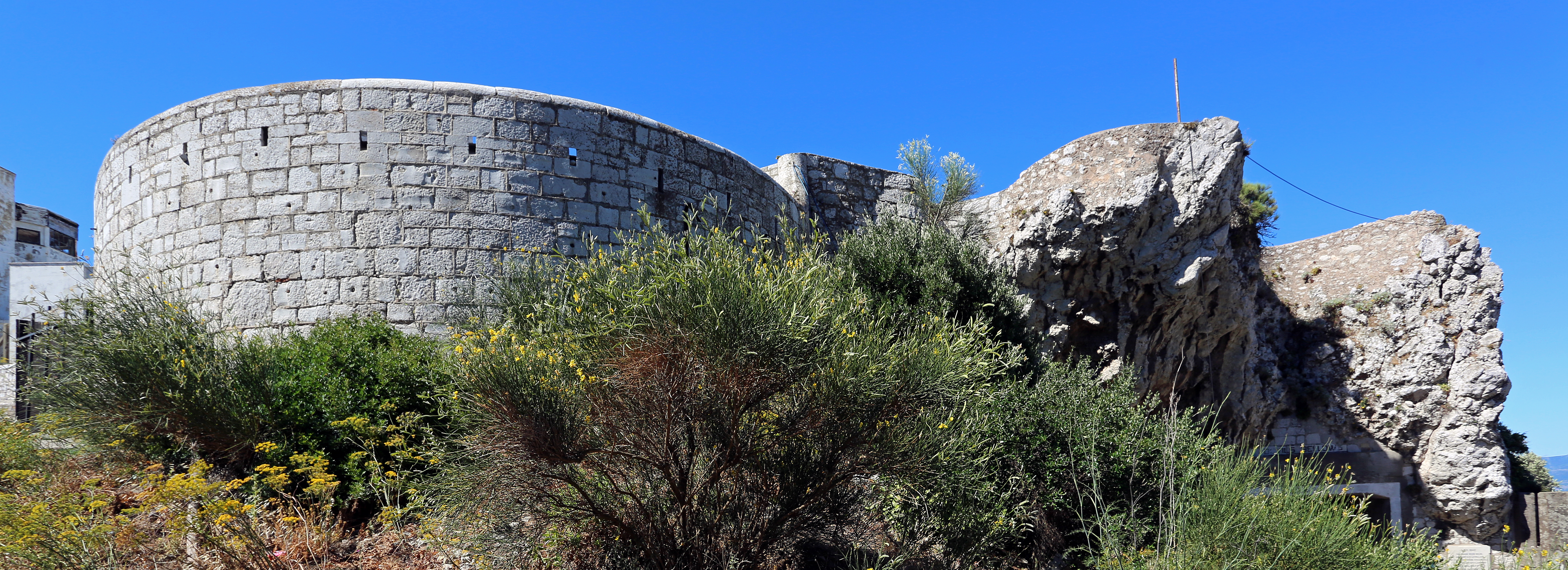
The Devil's Bellows fortification near Lathbury Barracks

During World War II the extensive tunnels within the Rock of Gibraltar were further extended. This included a tunnel that joined these barracks to the Gun Operations Room. This operations room was well connected to other tunnels, meaning that it was possible to travel to the north face of Gibraltar while remaining within the rock. Some of this journey would be down the Great North Road where you could take a ride on a passing truck. The tunnel between the operations room and the barracks was closed following a number of falls including one that killed a civilian visitor.

Lieutenant Colonel Mohamed Amekrane who had ordered an unsuccessful coup against King Hassan II of Morocco, was once imprisoned at Lathbury Barracks. The British Government extradited him to Morocco where he was executed. The British Government later made an out of court settlement in 1972 with his widow Malika Amekrane to avoid a case at the European Commission of Human Rights regarding his extradition.

In 1995, the government furnished the barracks with 1,000 bunkbeds to accommodate the athletes competing in the Island Games hosted by Gibraltar that year. The Royal Navy had previously used the barracks as a training camp.
