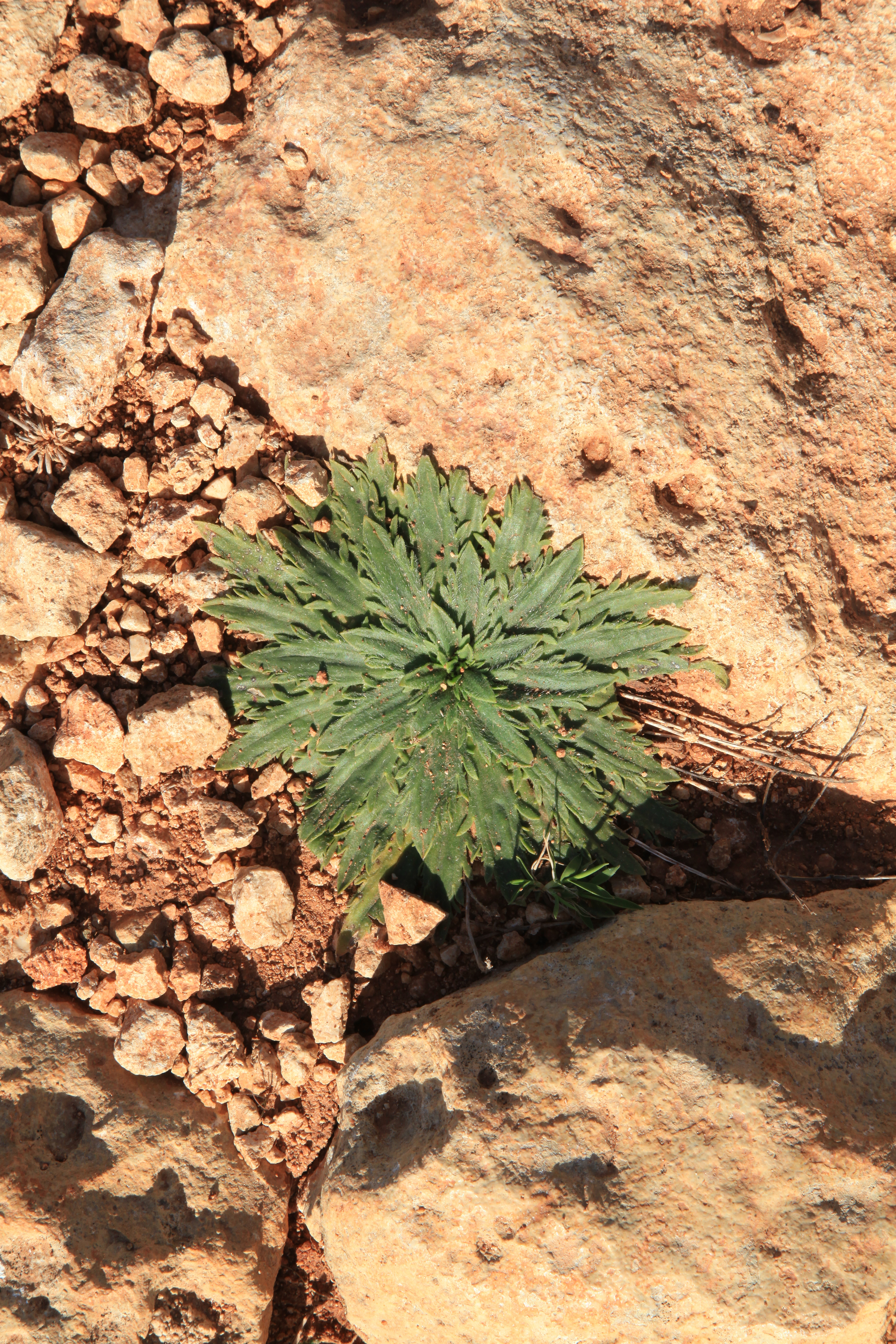

Scientific classification
- Kingdom: Plantae
- Clade: Tracheophytes
- Clade: Angiosperms
- Clade: Eudicots
- Clade: Asterids
- Order: Lamiales
- Family: Plantaginaceae
- Genus: Plantago
- Species: P. serraria

Binomial name
- Plantago serraria L.

= Plantago serraria =

Species of plant

Plantago serraria is a species of plant in the family Plantaginaceae.

== Sources ==
This article incorporates text from a free content work. Licensed under CC0 (license statement/permission). Text taken from Plantago serraria. Encyclopedia of Life.
