= Mereruka =

Ancient Egyptian vizier

- Vizier of Egypt
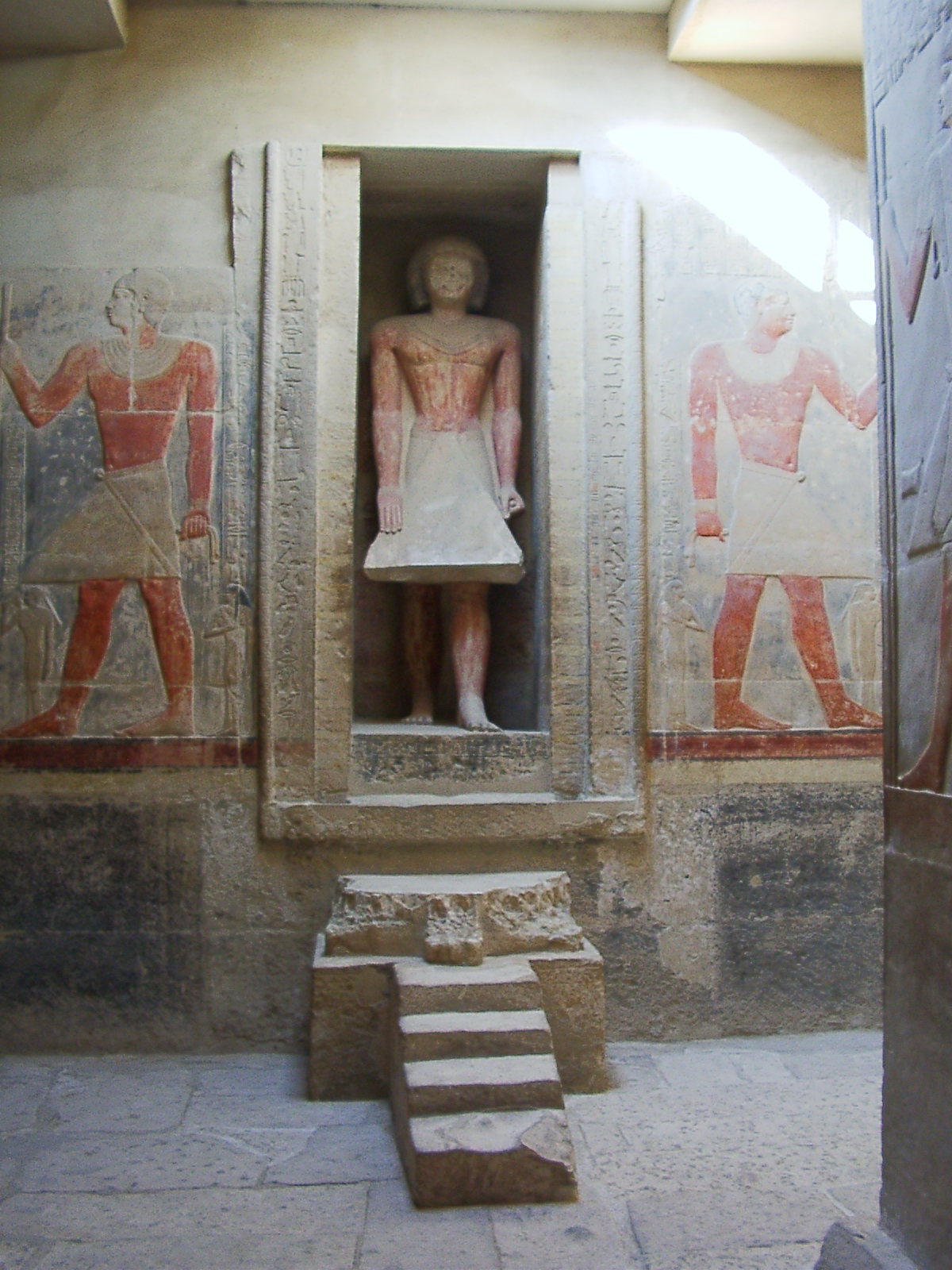
- Mereruka's false door bears an intact statue of Mereruka
- Pharaoh: Teti
- Burial: Saqqara, Egypt
- Spouse: Seshseshet Waatetkhethor
- Mother: Nedjetempet
- Children: Meryteti; Meriteti; Khenty; Khentu

Mereruka served during the Sixth Dynasty of Egypt as one of Egypt's most powerful officials at a time when the influence of local state noblemen was increasing in wealth and power. Mereruka held numerous titles along with that of Vizier, which made him the most powerful person in Egypt after the king himself. Among the other official positions that Mereruka held were "Director of all the king's works," "Governor of the palace," "Chief lector-priest," "Overseer of the royal record scribes," and "Inspector of the priests attached to the pyramid of Teti." He was married to Seshseshet Waatetkhethor, daughter of King Teti. His mother was named Nedjetempet and he possibly had a brother named Ihy, though this may be the same individual as Ihyemsaf, his grandson.

== Tomb ==
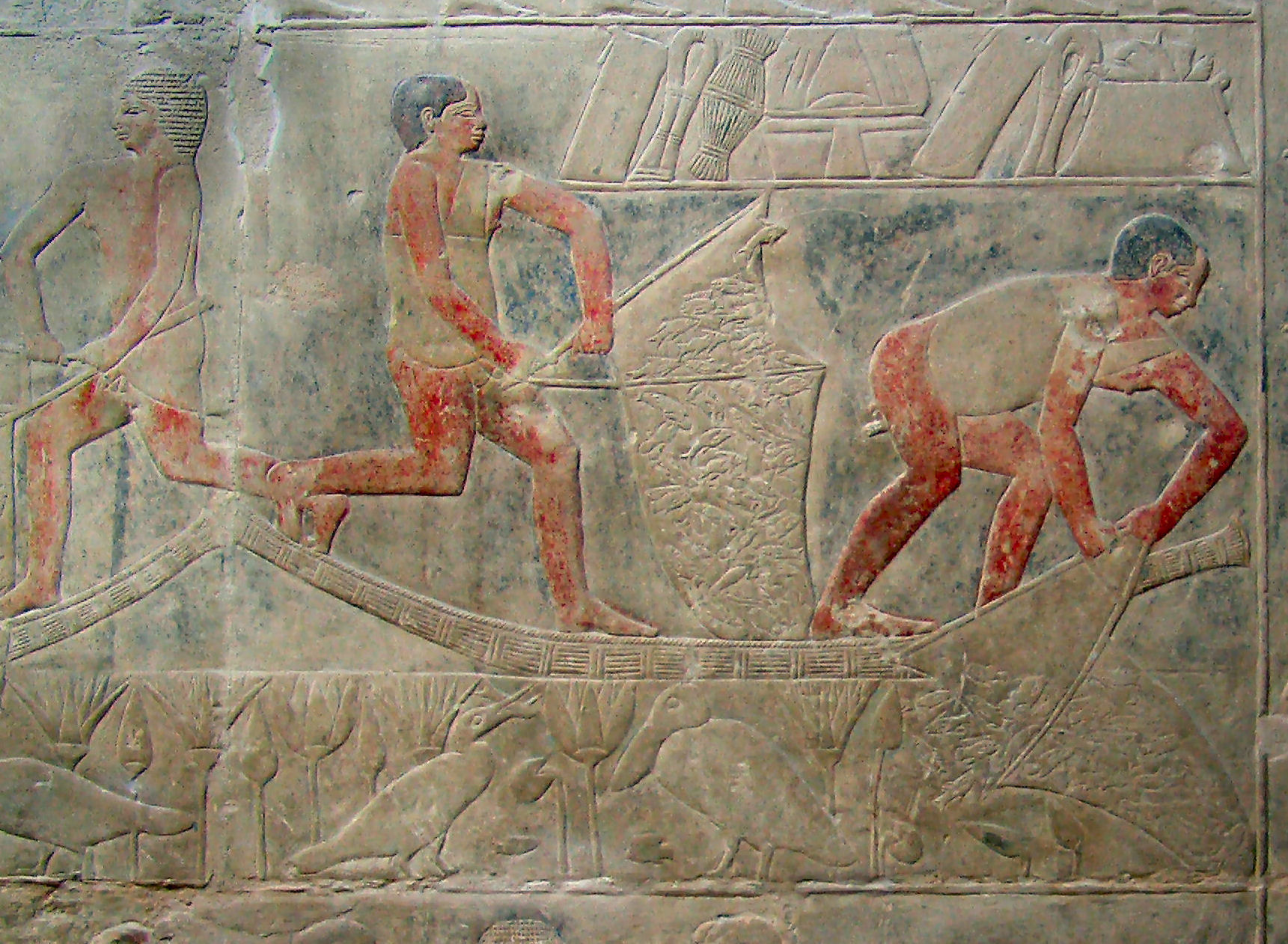
A vivid relief of fishermen collecting their catch at Mereruka's tomb

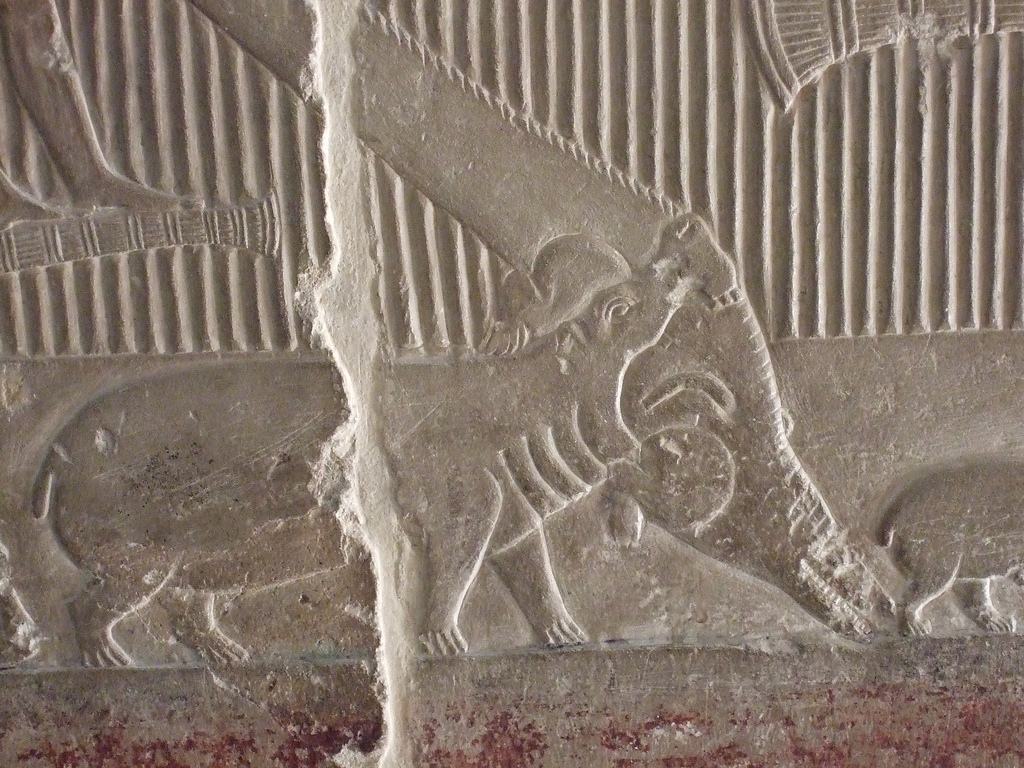
An adult hippopotamus is depicted attacking and killing a crocodile in Mereruka's tomb

A floor plan of the mastaba shows the complexity of the building

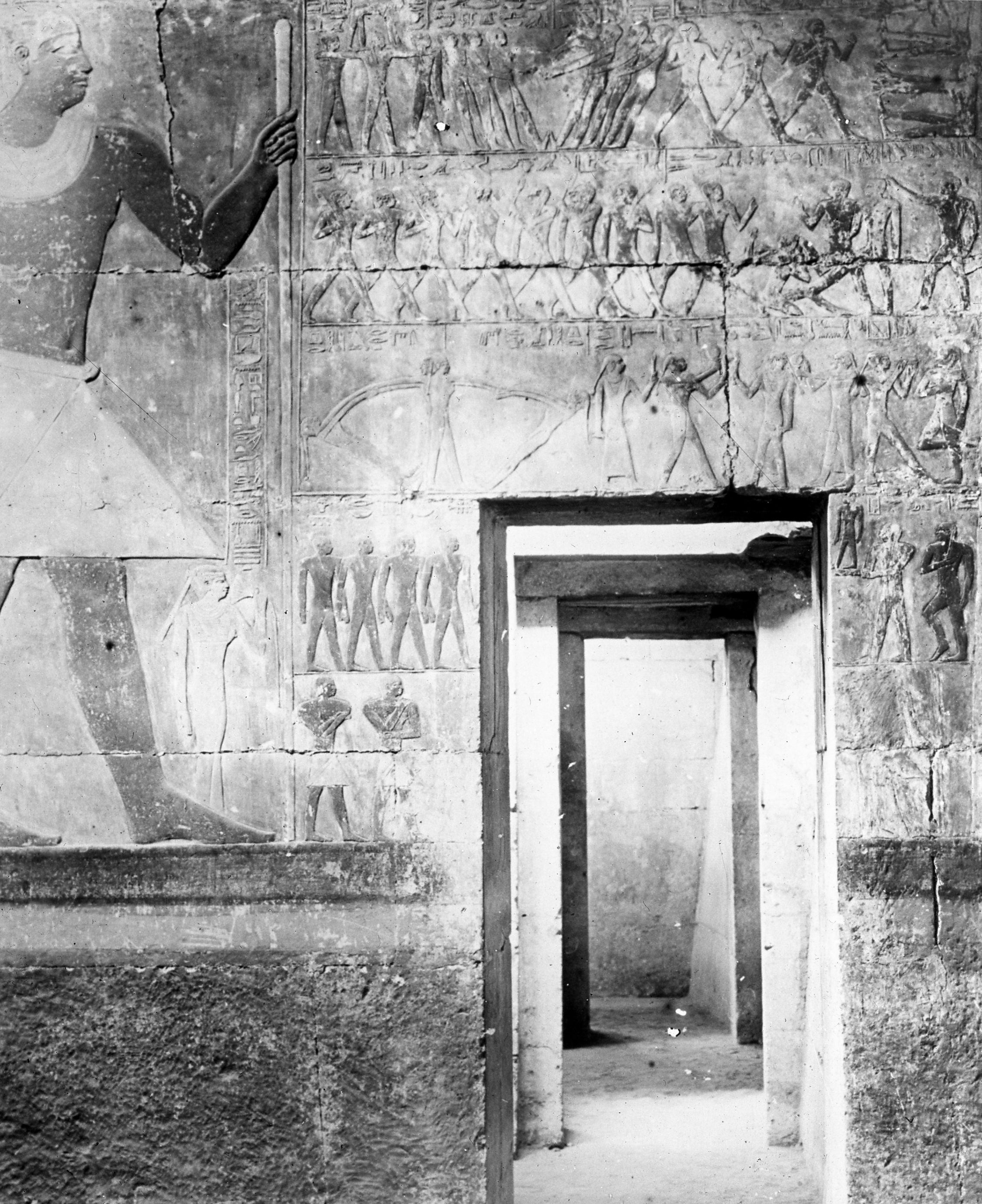
Lantern Slide Collection: Views, Objects: Egypt. Tomb of Mera, Sakkara. Dy. 6., n.d. Brooklyn Museum Archives

The mastaba of Mereruka is the largest and most elaborate of all the non-royal tombs in Saqqara with 33 rooms or chambers in total. Mereruka was the vizier to king Teti, who was the first pharaoh of the 6th dynasty Old Kingdom period of Egypt. Mereruka was married to Teti's daughter, princess Seshseshet Waatetkhethor. He was, therefore, the king's son-in-law. Princess Seshseshet Waatetkhethor is buried in Mereruka's mastaba tomb along with their son, Meriteti. The paintings on the wall in the entrance of the tomb show Mereruka painting the seasons and playing a board game. The first three chambers are decorated with scenes of furniture making, hunting and goldsmith working. A lifelike statue of Mereruka was found intact within the principal chamber at the far end of his mastaba tomb. This chamber is approached through the mastaba tomb's false door. Mereruka's mastaba tomb boasts vibrant and well preserved tomb decorations and numerous relief scenes. His mastaba tomb remained hidden from view until it was discovered and excavated by Jacques de Morgan, of the Egyptian Antiquities Service in 1892. However, the first major publication on his tomb did not occur until over 40 years later in 1936 by Prentice Duell. Mereruka was also known by his 'beautiful' or chosen name of Meri.

21 of the mastaba chambers (chambers A) are devoted to Mereruka himself, five are designated to his wife (chambers B) and five were added for his son Meriteti (or Meryteti) (chambers C). The overall external dimensions of Mereruka's mastaba are 23 metres east-west, 30 metres north-south (extending to 41 metres when one includes Meriteti's addition) and 4.5 metres high, while the internal height of the ceiling is just over 4 metres. Princess' complex at the left end of the tomb entrance to Mereruka's tomb depicts her "receiving offerings due to a king's daughter, including a selection of finely carved furniture" while she is shown relaxing and watching several dancing girls". In another scene, "she is portrayed with her three dogs and a pet monkey." On the walls of chamber 7, Waatetkhethor is shown sitting together with Mereruka "on a large couch, while she plays her harp to soothe him". While most of the rooms of Mereruka's mastaba tomb were decorated, those which were left bare were simply used for storage.

A hunting scene within Egypt's marshes from Mereruka's tomb show five men punting "a papyrus raft along a verdant Nile bank, packed with reeds and teeming with wildlife" while nesting lapwings are depicted protecting their young from a marauding ichneumon, or type of mongoose, by either "spreading their wings over their chicks or by mobbing the intruder." In the Nile river, one adult hippopotamus is shown seizing and killing a basking crocodile, "while behind it another crocodile turns the tables, waiting to devour a newborn hippopotamus." Other scenes show sculptors and carpenters of stone vases at work, while Mereruka and his wife are depicted inspecting a jeweller's workshop where some of the workers are dwarfs.

== See also ==
- Tug of war
