= Genista Caves =

Series of caves in Gibraltar

Genista Cave
- Interactive map of Genista Cave
- Location: Windmill Hill, Gibraltar
- Coordinates: 36°07′02″N 5°20′52″W

The Genista Caves are a series of caves located under Windmill Hill in the British Overseas Territory of Gibraltar. Fossils of various mammals and human remains were discovered here in the mid-1860s. The name of the caves is a play on words based on Captain Frederick Brome's name, who discovered them.

== History ==
Captain Frederick Brome excavated Genista I Cave in the 1860s. Brome’s investigations were so thorough that they prompted scientists of the calibre of Hugh Falconer and George Busk, secretaries of the Royal Society and the Linnean Society respectively, to visit Gibraltar in search of the breccias. Brome had taken up the appointment of Governor of the Military Prison on Windmill Hill, an ancient wave-cut platform at the southern end of Gibraltar where a system of fissure caves, known as the Genista Caves are situated. The largest and most important is Genista I which was discovered by Brome. He used his prisoners to excavate this deep fissure which yielded large quantities of bone some of which are thought to be the oldest found in Gibraltar. The fauna included brown bear, wild cat, lynx, leopard, spotted hyena, horse, narrow-nosed rhinoceros, wild boar, red deer, aurochs and ibex.

The exploration of the caves commenced as a result of a decision taken in 1862 to enlarge the boundaries of the military prison and to construct a large water tank. According to George Busk (1868):

“Within the enclosed space (for the water tank), and close to the south-east angle, an excavation was made for the proposed tank. This excavation led to the discovery of the first and most important of the series of caves on the Windmill Hill Plateau, which it is to be hoped will be known to all time by the name which has been given to them, in allusion and in honour of their discoverer and explorer.”

Busk was humorously referring to Genista as the Latin name of the broom, a Mediterranean shrub, as a play of words with Brome. Brome obtained the Secretary of State’s approval, at his suggestion, to employ prisoners on the new works and their construction and he kept a close supervision over what was going on. He clearly had great vision and intuition when it came to caves. He described the first time he found the fissure which was to lead to the discovery of Genista I like this:

“On removing the earth from this space, which varied from two to four feet in depth, an irregular surface of compact limestone presented itself; in which the only fissure visible was an open vertical one about six feet long and five inches wide, between two large blocks of limestone; the disturbed state and the peculiar position of these masses appeared to me, with the fissure, to be remarkable, and I drew the attention of Lieutenant Buckle, RE, in charge of the works, to them, who observed that ‘it was merely one of those fissures in which the Rock of Gibraltar abounded.’ Labour was directed to quarry out the limestone to the required depth for the tank, and, about the end of February, after blasting out a proportion of solid rock at a depth of nine feet from the original surface, a few bones were found in the bottom of a small fissure, under some dark mould; they were lying without order in all directions, and mostly fractured.

He was a thorough researcher and gained the respect of the scientists of the day with whom he corresponded. Busk, for example, wrote thus:

“Fortunately when the excavations on Windmill Hill were commenced, an accomplished and distinguished officer, fully alive to the importance of science, was in command of the fortress; and it was equally fortunate that the subsequent explorations were carried out by an observer so able, energetic and vigilant as Captain Frederick Brome, at that time Governor of the Prison. These operations, which were continued from April 1863 to December 1868, have of necessity required an amount of labour, and involved sometimes a degree of responsibility which it is not very easy to over-estimate. But this labour and responsibility have been ungrudgingly and most disinterestedly given and incurred by Captain Brome, who, with the aid of prisoners and their warders under his command, has in those five years conducted with surprising success an amount of difficult exploration never before equalled, and made collections in the public interest of unrivalled value.”

Brome also discovered Genista II which was a smaller cave. Genista III and Genista IV followed and all showed some evidence of habitation but Genista four was very inaccessible and was thought be a place of refuge rather than a place to live as its entrance was forty feet down from the summit on a cliff face of the Rock of Gibraltar. Most of the Genista floors are covered in stalagmites and investigators found human remains, pottery and broken bones. One possibility is that the caves were used as a place to live but after being abandoned they were reused as burial places.

The excavations revealed the bones of a large number of what are now locally extinct animals including lynx, leopard, hyena, rhinoceros and aurochs. They had evidently fallen through fissures in the surface and perished. Unfortunately the cave entrance was later lost or destroyed when a large magazine was built directly overhead at the end of the 19th century.
