= Saluting Battery =

Saluting Battery may refer to:

- Saluting Battery, Gibraltar
- Saluting Battery (Valletta), Malta
