= Gardiner's Battery =

Artillery battery in Gibraltar

- Part of Fortifications of Gibraltar
- Gibraltar
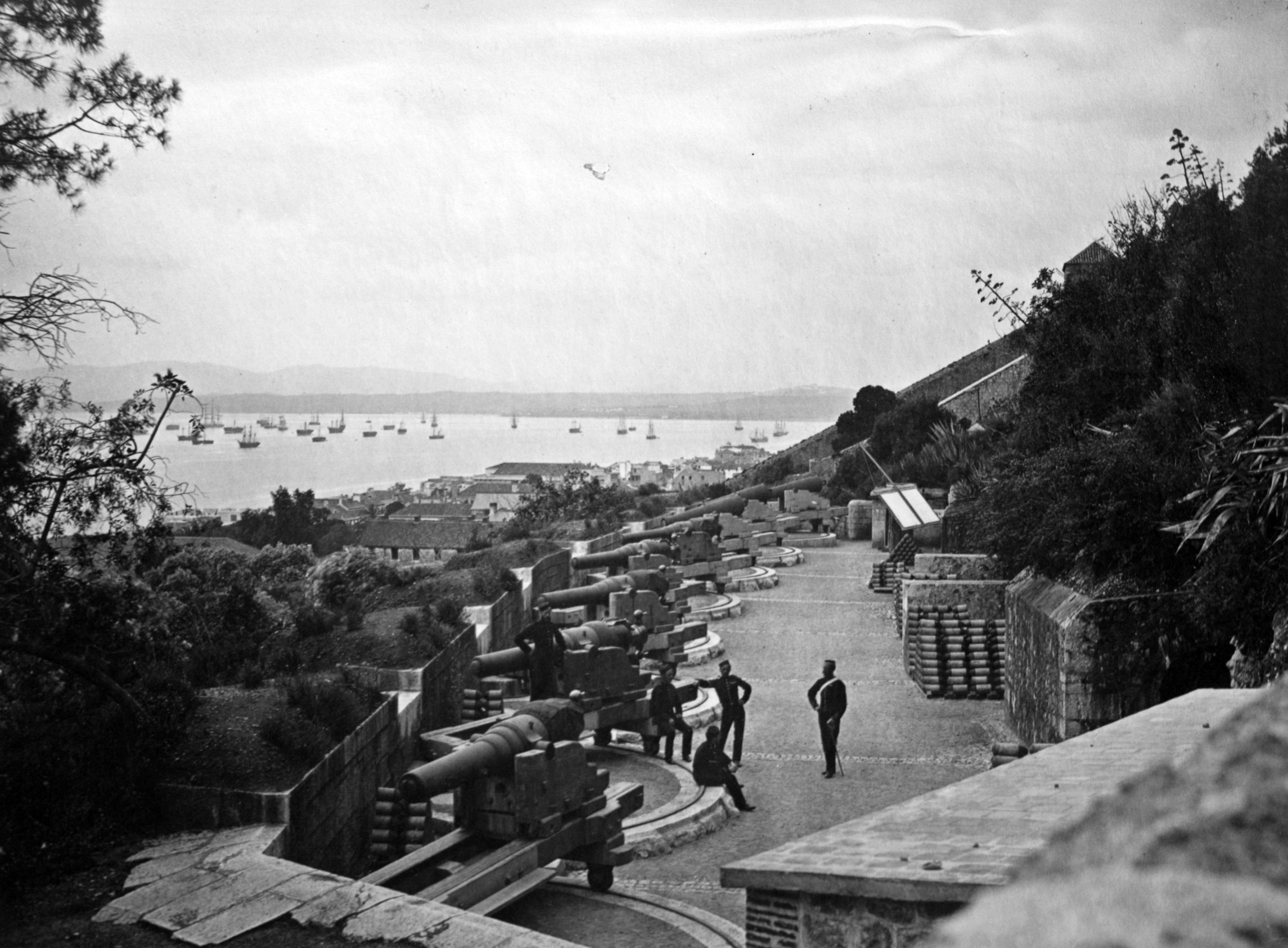
- Gardiner's Battery and gunners in 1879

Site information
- Type: Artillery battery

Location
- Location in Gibraltar
- Coordinates: 36.133408°N 5.351045°W

Gardiner's Battery is an artillery battery in the British Overseas Territory of Gibraltar. It is named after the governor Sir Robert Gardiner.

== Description ==
Gardiner's Battery was part of a second set of retired batteries which were proposed by General Sir John Jones. These "retired" batteries were set away from the shoreline in order that they could get greater range by taking advantage of the increased altitude of the Rock of Gibraltar. In addition the batteries were more difficult for the enemy to spot. Jones also built similar batteries at Raglan's Battery and Jones' Battery. This high battery fired out west over the top of Victoria Battery which was also a retired battery and both batteries fired out over the top of Saluting Battery that was on the coast.

In 1859 the battery had ten guns. At the end of the nineteenth century this battery was using the last generation of muzzle loading guns before breech-loaders became the standard.

The battery was named after the governor Sir Robert Gardiner, who was known for his disregard of the local population.

These must have been a success as the urge for increased height eventually led to guns being sited on the very top of the rock.
