= Prince of Wales Battery =

Artillery battery in Gibraltar

- Part of Fortifications of Gibraltar
- Gibraltar

Site information
- Type: Artillery battery
- Owner: Ministry of Defence

Prince of Wales Battery is an artillery battery in the British Overseas Territory of Gibraltar.

== Description ==
The four gun battery was well above the Line Wall Curtain in Gibraltar and defended the southern Jumper's Bastion. This battery was between the similarly armed Lady Augusta's Battery and the Cumberland Flank Battery.
