= Granada Gate =

City gate in Gibraltar

- Part of Fortifications of Gibraltar
- Gibraltar
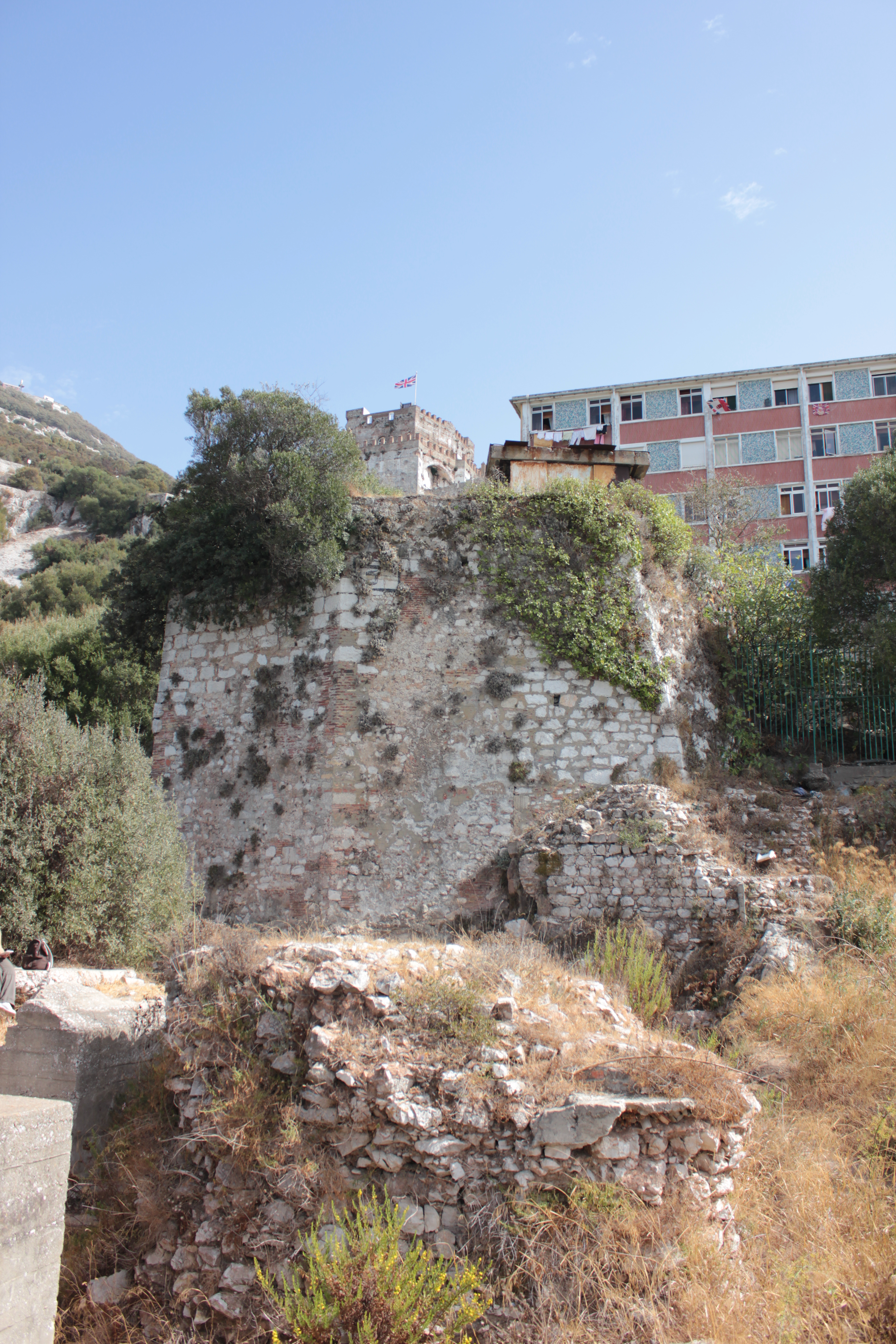
- Site of the gate

Site information
- Type: Gate
- Owner: Government of Gibraltar

Location
- Location in Gibraltar
- Coordinates: 36.144705°N 5.351144°W

Granada Gate was a city gate in the British Overseas Territory of Gibraltar. The gate was constructed during Gibraltars "Islamic period." It was the main entry point by land to the old town of Gibraltar at the time of its Marinid occupation during the 14th century. The gate was called the "Granada" gate due to the gate facing towards the city of Granada. The gate was destroyed by the British during the 18th century as part of an attempt to modernize and upgrade Gibraltar's defenses. Artifacts such as ceramics dating from the 14th to 18th centuries were recovered from excavations of the site.
