= Civil Hospital Battery =

Artillery battery in Gibraltar

- Part of Fortifications of Gibraltar
- Gibraltar

Site information
- Type: Artillery battery
- Owner: Ministry of Defence

Location
- Location in Gibraltar
- Coordinates: 36.140844°N 5.351802°W

Civil Hospital Battery was an artillery battery in the British Overseas Territory of Gibraltar.

== Description ==
This battery was south of the Moorish Castle and in 1859 it had six guns. This battery would have been called a "retired" battery as it was well away from Gibraltar Harbour. These batteries were harder for an enemy to target and their increased height on the slopes of Gibraltar gave the gunners increased visibility and range.
