= Lady Augusta's Battery =

Artillery battery in Gibraltar

- Part of Fortifications of Gibraltar
- Gibraltar

Site information
- Type: Artillery battery
- Owner: Ministry of Defence

Lady Augusta's Battery was an artillery battery in the British Overseas Territory of Gibraltar.

== Description ==
The four gun battery was well above the Line Wall Curtain in Gibraltar and defended the two Jumper's Bastions. This battery was between the similarly armed Prince of Wales Battery and the larger Queen Victoria's Battery.
