= Raglan's Battery =

Artillery battery in Gibraltar

- Part of Fortifications of Gibraltar
- Gibraltar
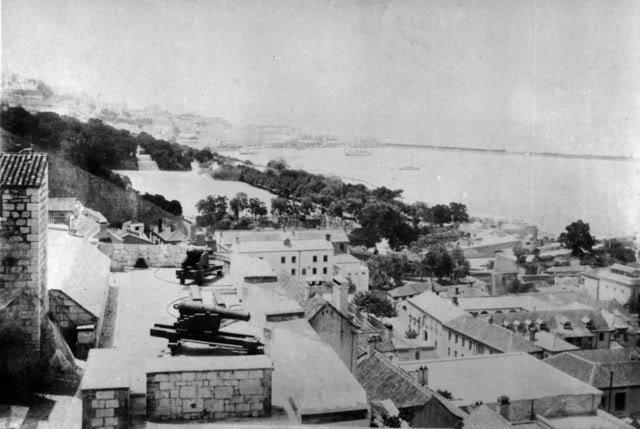
- View of Raglan's Battery while still in use (possibly 19th century)

Site information
- Type: Artillery battery
- Owner: Ministry of Defence

Location
- Location in Gibraltar
- Coordinates: 36.136797°N 5.351672°W

Raglan's Battery was an artillery battery overlooking the harbour in the British Overseas Territory of Gibraltar. During World War II the Raglan Battery Shelter was here.

== Description ==
Raglan's Battery was one of the first set of retired batteries which were proposed by General Sir John Jones. These "retired" batteries were the first to be set away from the shoreline in order that they could get greater range by taking advantage of the increased altitude of the Rock of Gibraltar. In addition, the batteries were more difficult for the enemy to spot. Jones also recommended similar batteries at the Civil Hospital and the Jones' Battery.

These must have been a success as a further set were constructed which included Gardiner's Battery and eventually led to guns being sited on the very top of the rock.

During World War II Raglan Battery Shelter was constructed at this site forming part of the tunnel and underground road known as the Great North Road.
