= Saluting Battery, Gibraltar =

Artillery battery in Gibraltar

Saluting Battery
- Part of Fortifications of Gibraltar
- Gibraltar
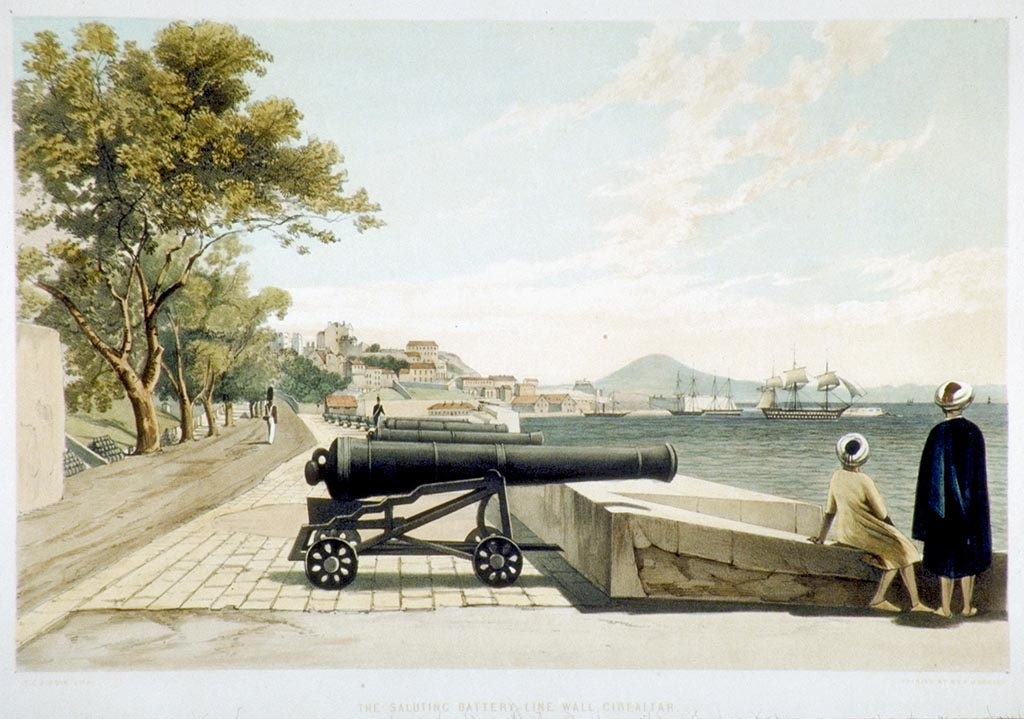
- by Thomas Colman Dibdin in 1846

Site information
- Type: Artillery battery
- Owner: Government of Gibraltar
- Open to the public: Yes

Location
- Location in Gibraltar
- Coordinates: 36.132321°N 5.353068°W

Saluting Battery was an artillery battery in the British Overseas Territory of Gibraltar.

== Description ==
The battery was above the Line Wall Curtain in Gibraltar and defended the west side including Gibraltar Harbour. Today the battery has been converted into a promenade. Both Gardiner's Battery and Victoria Battery were higher or retired batteries that fired over the top of Saluting Battery that was on the coast.
