= Barcina Gate =

City gate in Gibraltar

Coordinates: 36°08′45″N 5°21′13″W

- Part of Fortifications of Gibraltar
- Gibraltar

Site information
- Type: Gate
- Owner: Government of Gibraltar

Barcina Gate was a city gate in the British Overseas Territory of Gibraltar. It was located near the port and formed part of the walls, towers and one of three separate access gates which were later named Barcina by the Spanish. Henrique de Guzman was hanged on one of the turrets of the gate here.
