= Jones' Battery =

Artillery battery in Gibraltar

- Part of Fortifications of Gibraltar
- Gibraltar

Site information
- Type: Artillery battery
- Owner: Ministry of Defence

Location
- Location in Gibraltar
- Coordinates: 36.1433°N 5.350°W

Site history
- Built by: General Sir John Jones

Jones' Battery is one of the best preserved of the "retired" artillery battery in the British Overseas Territory of Gibraltar. It was named after Sir John Thomas Jones who once controlled the fortifications here.

== Description ==
Jones' Battery is close to the Moorish Castle. It was one of the first set of retired batteries which were proposed by General Sir John Jones. Jones was an important fortifications expert well respected by military engineers. These "retired" batteries were the first to be set away from the shoreline in order that they could get increased range by taking advantage of the steep slopes of the Rock of Gibraltar. In addition the batteries location was less obvious to the enemy. Jones also built similar batteries at the Civil Hospital and at Raglan's Battery overlooking the harbour. In 1859 this battery had eleven guns.

The battery was reportedly well preserved in 2006 as it still had the main wall, expense magazines, parapet and embrasures could be seen just off a road to the Moorish Castle Estate.

Jones' idea eventually led to guns being sighted on the very top of the rock.
