= Cumberland Flank Battery =

Artillery battery in Gibraltar

- Part of Fortifications of Gibraltar
- Gibraltar

Site information
- Type: Artillery battery
- Owner: Ministry of Defence

Location
- Location in Gibraltar
- Coordinates: 36.12654°N 5.35190°W

Cumberland Flank Battery was an artillery battery in the British Overseas Territory of Gibraltar.

== Description ==
The Cumberland Flank Battery was a large battery located around the docks area and could fire at enemy shipping that approached Gibraltar Harbour. In 1859 there were 32 guns that formed the Cumberland Flank and the New Mole Battery. Today there is a Cumberland Road on the rock to the east of the dockyard which records the battery's name.
