= Islam in Gibraltar =

According to the World Religion Database (2024), Muslims constitute approximately 4.88% of Gibraltar's population, with around 1,600 individuals out of a total population of 32,000. The Muslim community is predominantly Sunni (4.80%), with a smaller Shia minority (0.08%). The proportion of Muslims in Gibraltar has gradually increased over the years, from 3.6% in 2012.

== History ==
The Rock of Gibraltar was first occupied by Muslim forces in 711 AD, when Berber troops from North Africa, led by Tariq ibn Ziyad, landed at its foot. This event is known as the beginning of the Islamic conquest of the Iberian Peninsula. The name "Gibraltar" is derived from the Arabic name "Jebel Tariq," meaning "Tariq's Mountain." Muslim rule in Gibraltar lasted from 711 to 1462, with the exception of a brief period from 1309 to 1333. In 1462, the Catholic Monarchs reconquered Gibraltar during the Eighth Siege, as part of the Reconquista. Several structures from the Islamic period still stand, including parts of the Line Wall and the Moorish Castle.

== See also ==
- Ibrahim-al-Ibrahim Mosque
- Al-Andalus
