= King's Lines Battery =

Artillery battery in Gibraltar

- Part of Fortifications of Gibraltar
- Gibraltar
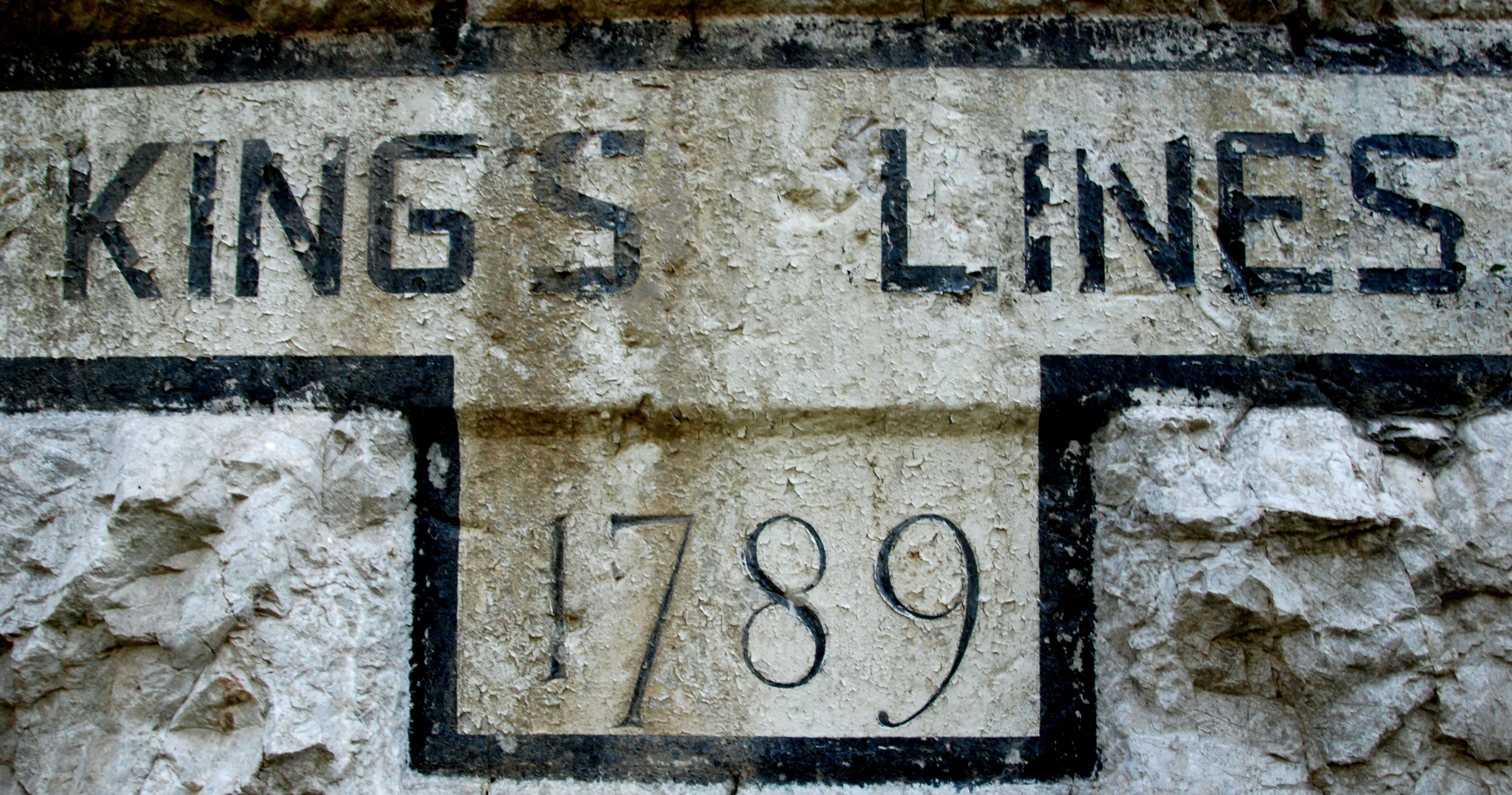
- King's Lines, Gibraltar

Site information
- Type: Artillery battery
- Owner: Ministry of Defence

Location
- Location in Gibraltar
- Coordinates: 36.145074°N 5.350555°W

King's Lines Battery is an artillery battery in the British Overseas Territory of Gibraltar. It was originally built along the access path up to the Gate of Granada.

== Description ==
This battery was originally built along the access path up to the Gate of Granada. It is part of the North Front defences of the Rock of Gibraltar together with Couvreport Battery, Hanover Battery, Bomb Proof Battery and the tunnel system. This is a Class A listed building as designated by the Government of Gibraltar's Gibraltar Heritage Trust Act of 1989.

The King's Lines occupy part of much older Moorish or Spanish Lines already in use during the siege of 1704. They are clearly shown on maps of Gibraltar from 1627. The Lines were named soon after the 1704 Capture of Gibraltar after the Archduke Charles of Austria otherwise known as Charles III, King of Spain. It was on his behalf that Gibraltar was captured by the allied forces in 1704.
