= Star Chamber Cave =

Cave in Gibraltar

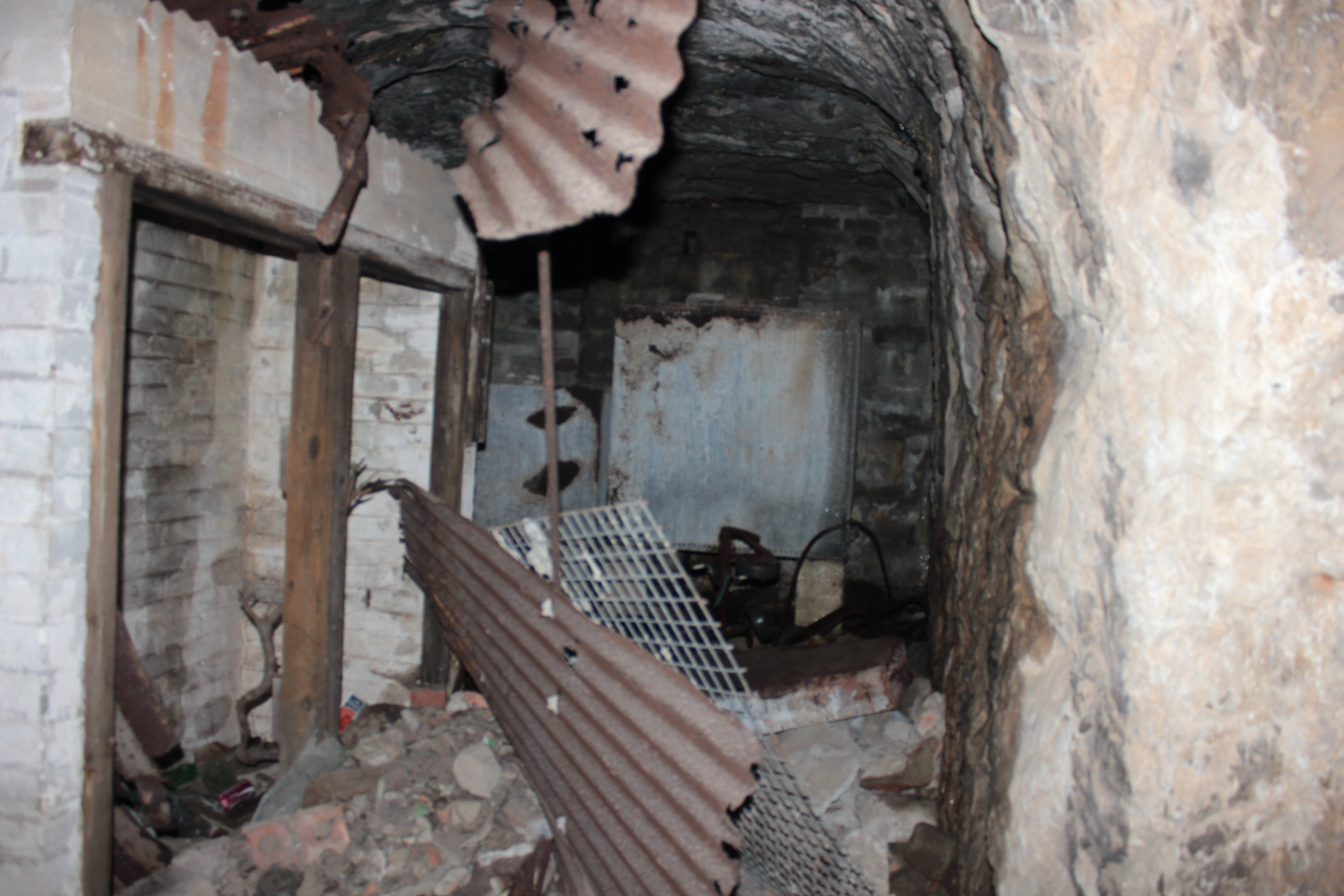

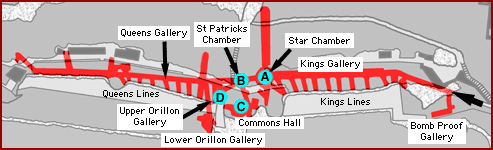
- The Northern Defences below the surface. A Star Chamber B St. Patrick's Chamber C Commons Hall D Upper Orillon Gallery
- Coordinates: 36°8′45.96″N 5°20′56.52″W
- Entrances: 2
- Entrances list: via King's Lines or Hanover Battery
- Access: by arrangement

Star Chamber Cave is a limestone cave in the British Overseas Territory of Gibraltar. In the 1780s the cave became the centre of tunnels known as the Lower Galleries of the Northern Defences. In 1941 this cave was still in military use as the King's Regiment Battalion Headquarters

== Description ==
Star Chamber Cave is a natural limestone cave in Gibraltar which was incorporated into the Northern Defences complex/ The cave is within the Rock of Gibraltar at the centre of a tunnel system known as the Lower Galleries.

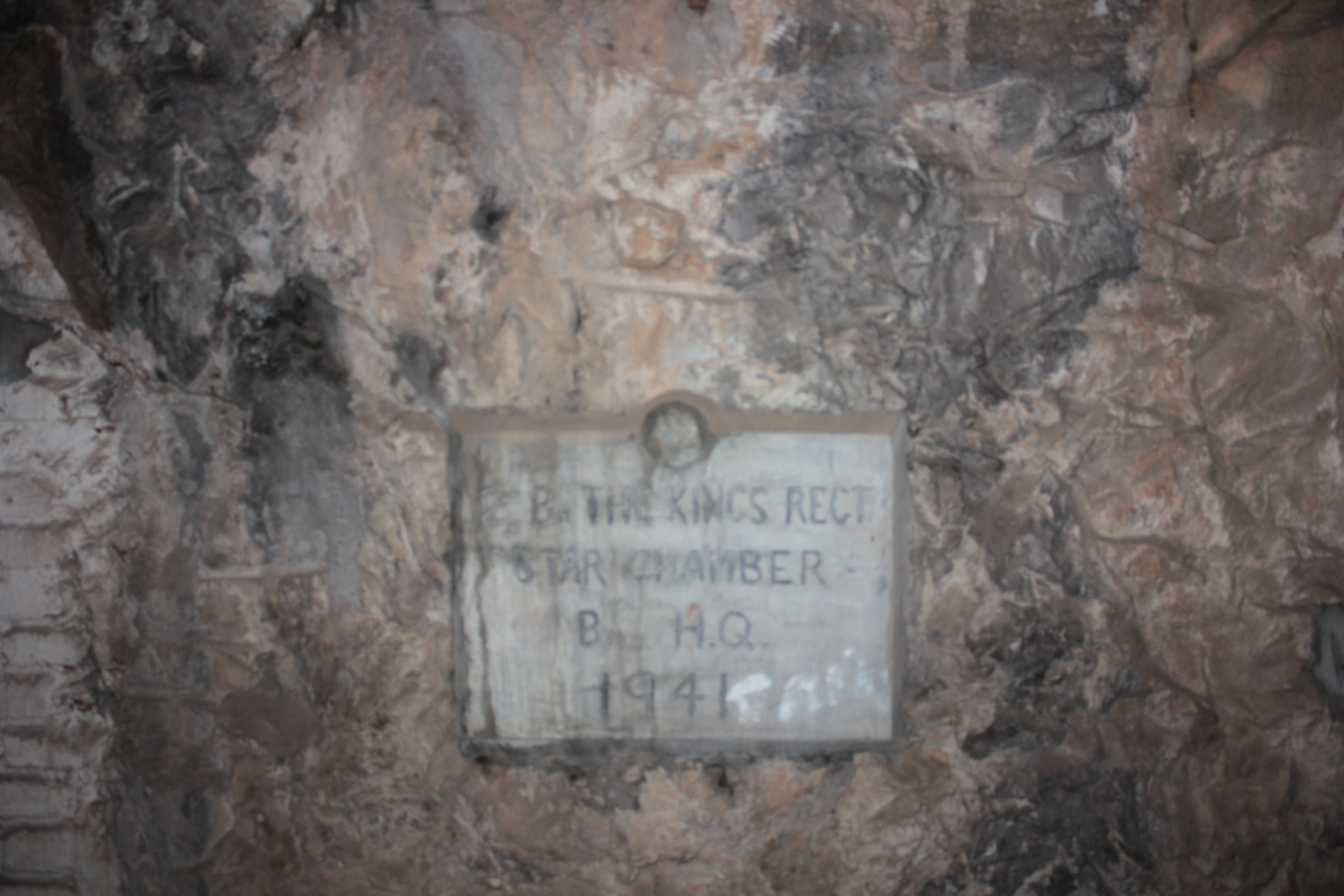
King's Battalion HQ

Unlike the Upper Galleries these are not a tourist attraction but can be visited by prior arrangement. The main entrance is by Hanover Battery and Star Chamber Cave is only found after travelling through the Hanover and King's Galleries which were created from 1787 to 1789. Star Chamber Cave could also be accessed via the King's Lines fortification. This cave was literally and organisationally at the centre of the tunnelling operations of the 18th century by the Soldier Artificer Company (later the Royal Engineers).

During World War II the tunnels were still being used and brick buildings were constructed within the cave and galleries. A sign on the wall of the cave records that in 1941 this cave was the King's Regiment Battalion Headquarters.

== See also ==
- List of caves in Gibraltar
