= Grand Battery, Gibraltar =

Artillery battery in Gibraltar

Grand Battery
- Part of Fortifications of Gibraltar
- Gibraltar
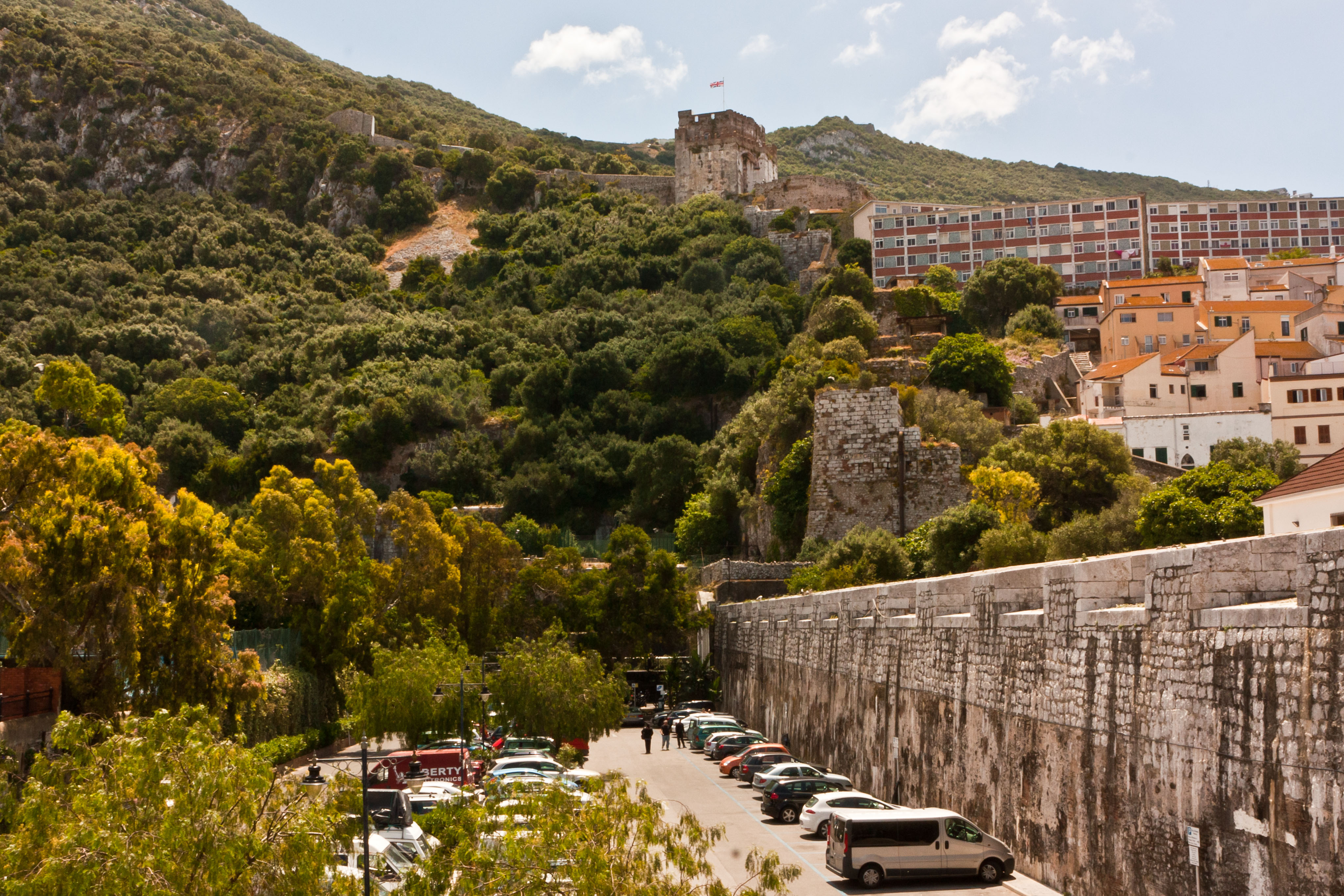
- View of Grand Battery and the Moorish Castle in 2013

Site information
- Type: Artillery battery
- Owner: Government of Gibraltar

Location
- Location in Gibraltar
- Coordinates: 36.145402°N 5.352102°W

Grand Battery is an artillery battery in the British Overseas Territory of Gibraltar. To the west of the grand battery was a very formidable flank which was considered to have been a "great annoyance to the besiegers."

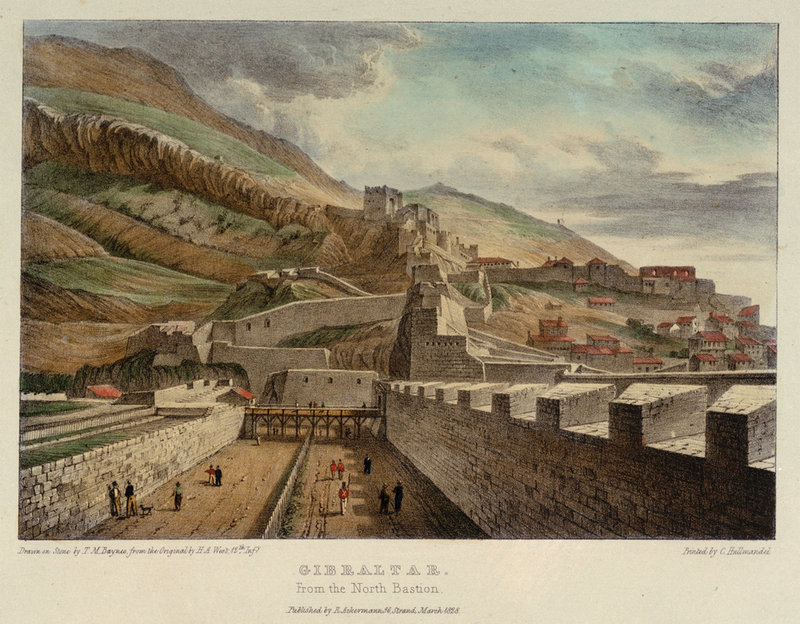
The same view from 1828

Known as the Muralla de San Bernando (English: St. Bernard's Wall) during Gibraltar's Spanish period, it was fully adapted to mount cannon facing the isthmus with the old Moorish archery towers being pulled down and replaced by bastions.

This battery forms part of a series of batteries built on the Moorish and Spanish lines that zigzagged up the hill of the Moorish Castle to the Tower of Homage on the Rock of Gibraltar. Seven of these batteries were formed along the city's walls.
