= Orillon Batteries =

Artillery batteries in Gibraltar (1788)

Orillon Battery
- Part of Fortifications of Gibraltar
- Gibraltar
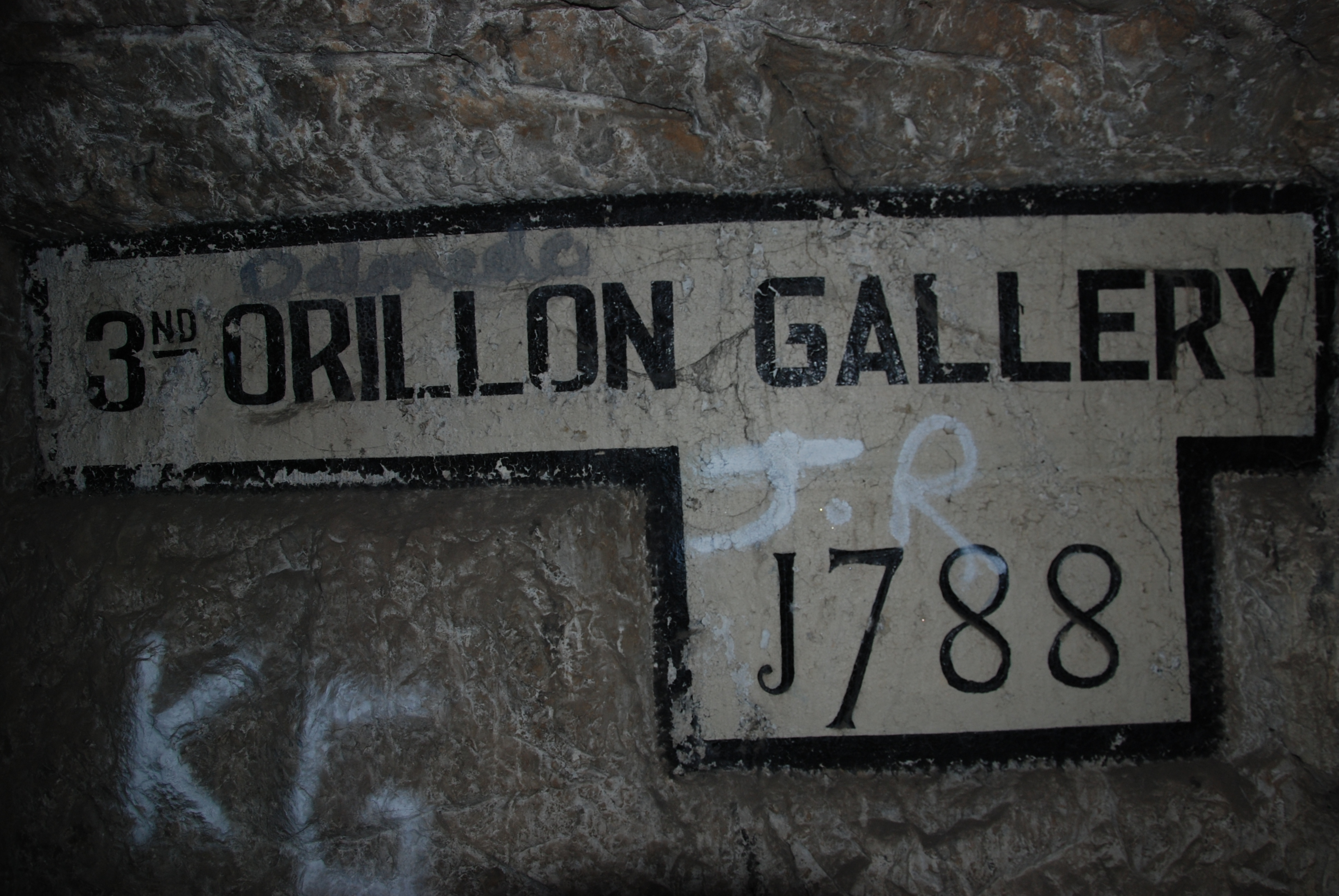
- The 3rd Orillon Battery was above the Orillon Gallery

Site information
- Type: Artillery battery
- Owner: Government of Gibraltar

Location
- Location in Gibraltar
- Coordinates: 36.146011°N 5.348941°W

Site history
- Built: 1788

The Orillon Batteries were artillery batteries in the British Overseas Territory of Gibraltar. The batteries were three-storey gun positions within a natural fault in the Rock of Gibraltar.

== Description ==
The Orillon Batteries are part of what is known as the Northern Defences which include these batteries together with Bomb Proof Battery, Hanover Gallery, Kings and Queens Galleries, Star Chamber Cave, Commons Hall and St. Patrick's Chamber. These lie behind the blocks of government flats called Laguna Estate in Gibraltar's north district and are currently closed to the public. These batteries are part of the Lower Galleries. There were thought to have been four Orillon batteries but it is unclear where the 2nd and 4th batteries were.

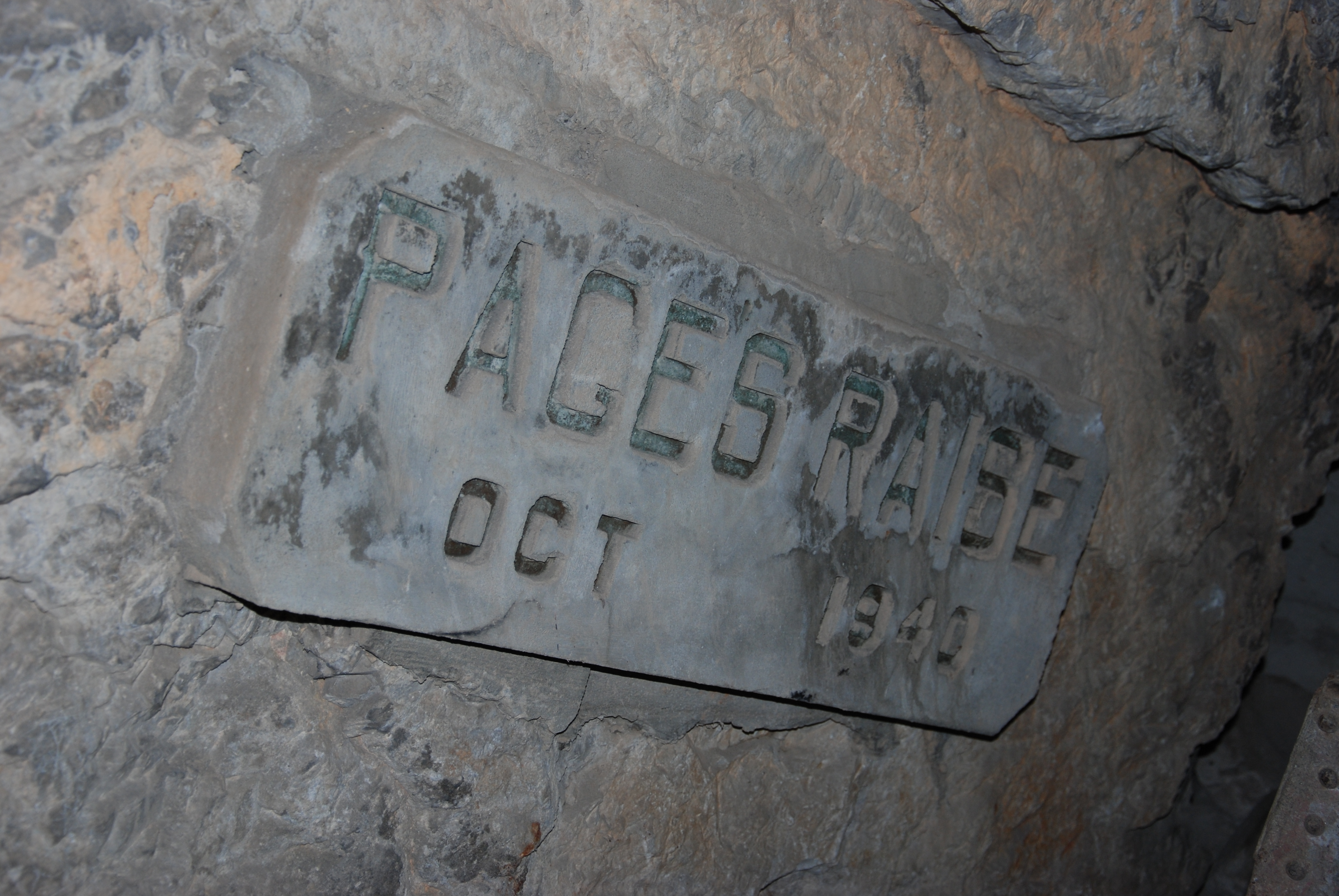
Plaque at Pages Raise

The batteries had a three-storey gun position within a natural fault in the Rock. The 1st Orillon Gallery can be found by descending stairs called Pages Raise (Named after 2nd Lieutenant Page of the 178 Tunnelling Coy R.E.) step off Queens Gallery which is an arterial tunnel on the eastern side of the Northern Defences. This battery had three guns.

The 3rd Orillon Gallery is at the centre of the Northern Defences and links into St. Patrick's Chamber. The gallery dates from 1788 but the battery disappeared some time later. This space was used as a kitchen and a period oven is still in situ. Evidence of the substantial wooden floor that was created for the 3rd battery can still be seen. The battery was created by large planks that would have rested on the perimeter ledges that can still be seen. They would have created a platform for the battery nearly two metres above the existing floor.
