= Castle Batteries =

Series of artillery batteries in Gibraltar

- Part of Fortifications of Gibraltar
- Gibraltar
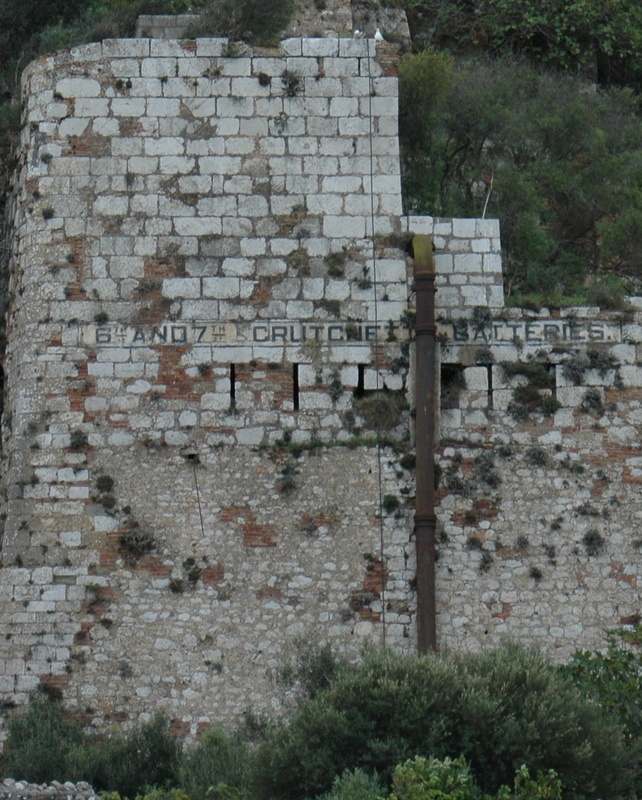
- 6th and 7th Crutchett's Batteries

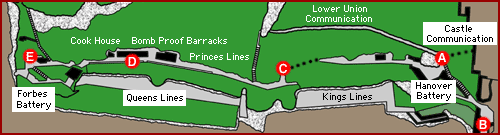
- "The Northern Defences" of Gibraltar including A Castle Communication, B Castle Batteries, C Princes Gallery, D Bombproof Barracks, E Forbes' Battery. Also Hanover Battery, a nearby Magazine, Kings, Princes and Queen's Lines and galleries.

Site information
- Type: Artillery battery
- Open to the public: ?

Location
- Location in Gibraltar
- Coordinates: 36.145063°N 5.351505°W

Castle Batteries are a series of artillery batteries that are part of the Northern Defences of the British Overseas Territory of Gibraltar. The batteries descend from the Moorish Castle to end at the sixth and seven batteries which are known as Crutchett's Batteries. There are brick vaulted bombproof rooms (casemates) under Crutchets Battery.

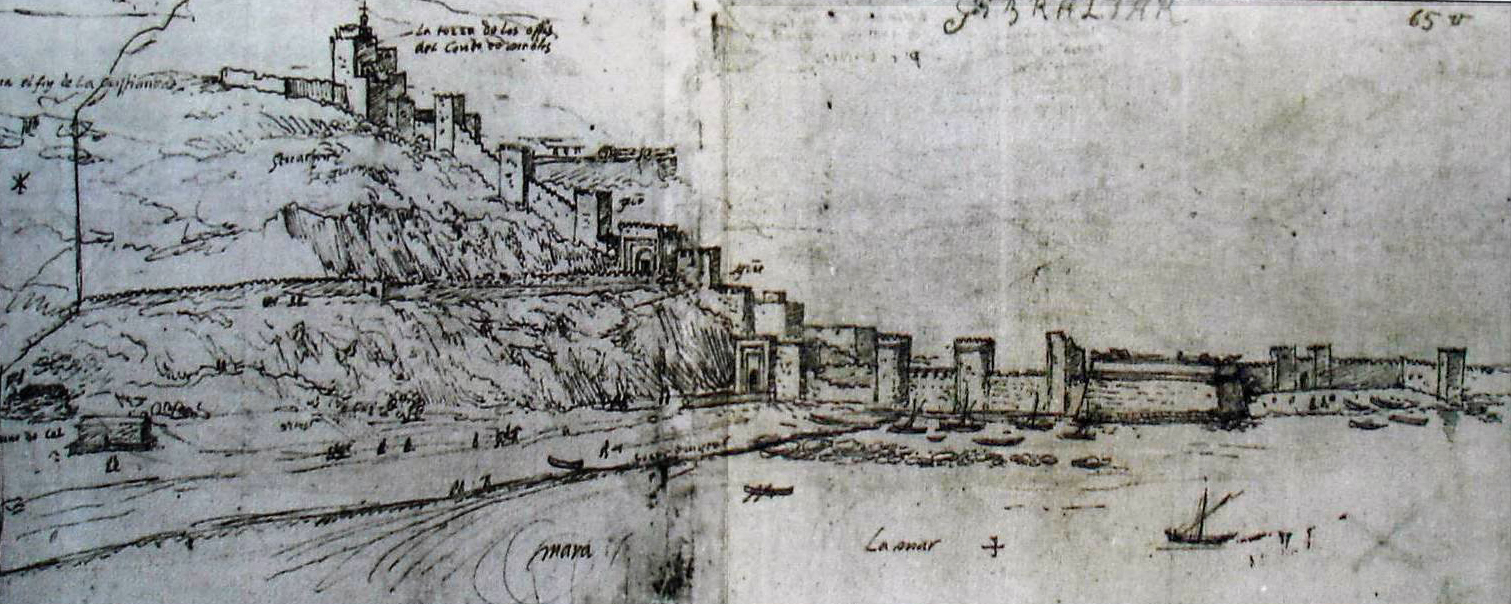
The northern approach to Gibraltar as seen in 1567; the batteries can be seen one above each other up the side of the rock.

The batteries were part of the northern defences of Gibraltar. Armies can only attack Gibraltar without ships from the north and therefore this is heavily fortified around the only gate to Spain called Landport. Cornwell describes how this was defended by "several batteries, numerous batteries on the Glacis of Landport, by Crutchett's and the Grand Battery". He speculated that no army could withstand the grapeshot from 400 "pieces of heavy artillery".
