= Queen Charlotte's Battery =

Artillery battery in Gibraltar

- Part of Fortifications of Gibraltar
- Gibraltar
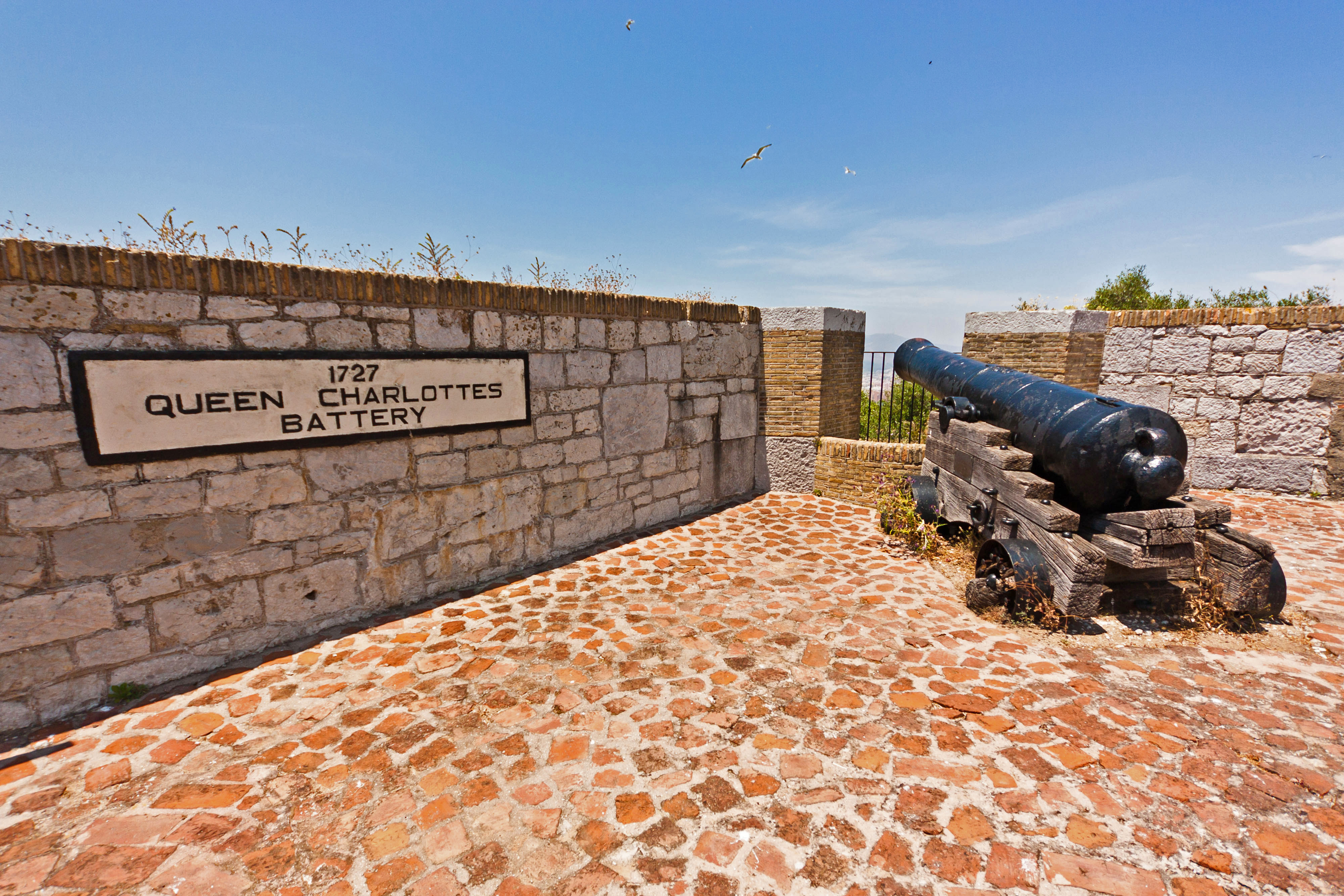
- Queen_Charlottes_Battery

Site information
- Type: Artillery battery
- Owner: Ministry of Defence

Location
- Location in Gibraltar
- Coordinates: 36.1441°N 5.3496°W

Queen Charlotte's Battery is a 1727 artillery battery in the British Overseas Territory of Gibraltar.

== Description ==
Queen Charlotte's battery is on the eastern corner of the Moorish Castle and it has been there since 1727. It was to the south of Hanover Battery that had an entrance into the long tunnels of the Northern Defences. In 1859 Queen Charlotte's battery had two guns. This battery would have been called a "retired" battery as it was well away from Gibraltar Harbour. These batteries were harder for an enemy to target and their increased height on the slopes of Gibraltar gave the gunners increased visibility and range. The battery still has guns and is open to the public.
