= Forbes' Quarry =

Cave in Gibraltar

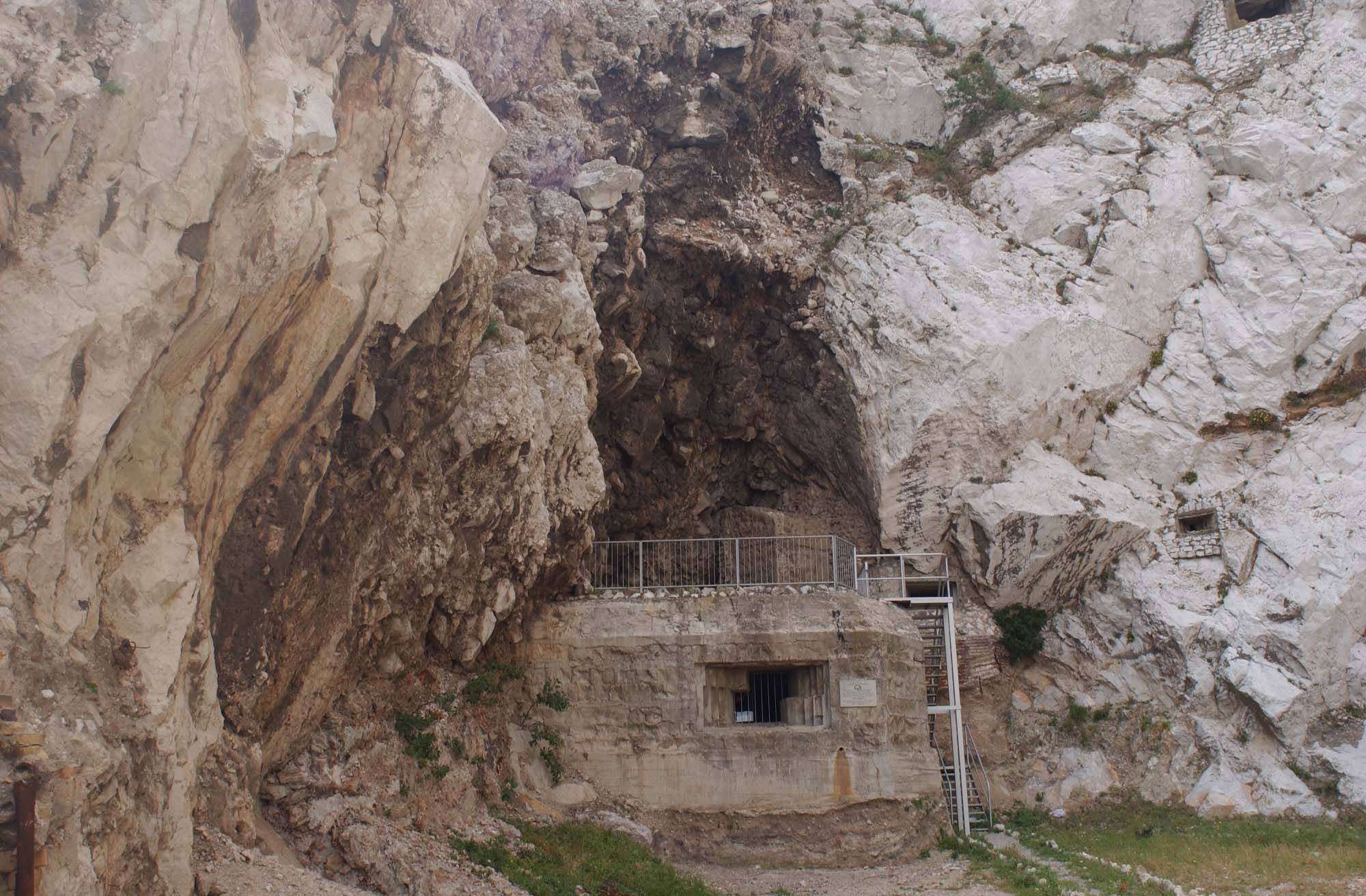
- Entrance to Forbes' Quarry cave showing a World War II pillbox

- Location within Gibraltar
- Location: North face of the Rock of Gibraltar, Upper Rock Nature Reserve, Gibraltar
- Coordinates: 36°08′48″N 5°20′48″W
- Length: 22 cm (8.7 in)
- Geology: Limestone
- Entrances: 1

Forbes' Quarry is located on the northern face of the Rock of Gibraltar within the Upper Rock Nature Reserve in the British Overseas Territory of Gibraltar. The area was quarried during the 19th century to supply stone for reinforcing the fortress' military installations. In the course of the quarrying, a limestone cave was found. The second ever Neanderthal discovery was made within this cave when Cpt. Edmund Flint found the skull of an adult female Neanderthal in 1848.

== Etymology ==
Forbes' Quarry borrows its name from an 18th-century military installation located directly above the cave and known as Forbes' Battery.

== History ==
=== Neanderthal discovery ===
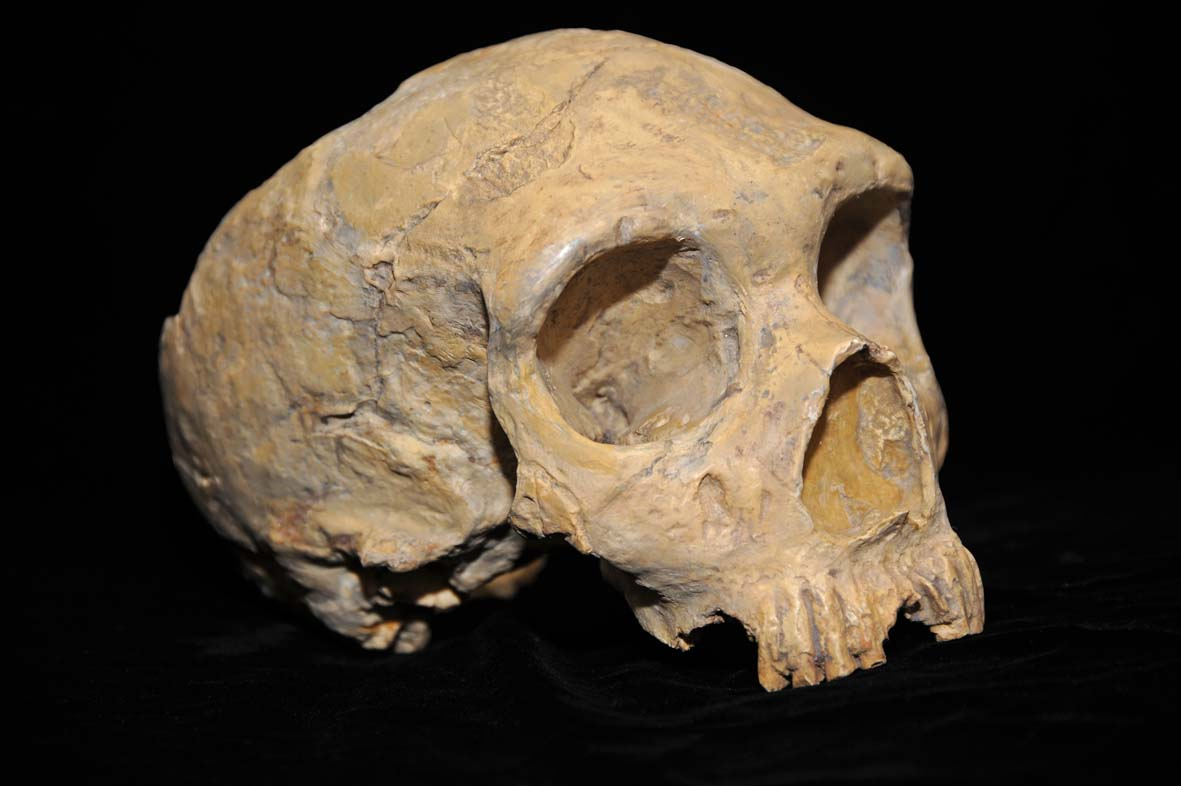
Gibraltar 1, the Neanderthal skull discovered at Forbes' Quarry in 1848 by Cpt. Edmund Flint

An ancient skull (specimen name Gibraltar 1) was found within Forbes' Quarry by Captain Edmund Flint of the Royal Navy in 1848. Being the secretary of the Gibraltar Museum Society (formerly the Gibraltar Scientific Society), he presented his find to the society on 3 March 1848. This was only the second Neanderthal fossil ever found. The skull had unusual features, but its significance as a representative of an extinct human species was not realised until 1864, eight years after the 1856 discovery of the more extensive assemblage of Neanderthal remains in the Neander Valley of Germany that eventually became the type specimen and source of the name of the species Homo neanderthalensis. The Forbes' Quarry skull attracted the attention of prominent scientists in Great Britain when it was presented at a meeting of the British Association for the Advancement of Science in September 1864. Charles Darwin had long been curious about the skull, but was too ill to attend the meeting, so geologist Charles Lyell and anthropologist Hugh Falconer arranged to bring the skull to his residence so he could examine it. In a letter, Darwin described the skull as "wonderful".

The skull found at Forbes' Quarry has been determined to be that of an adult female. She was probably over age 40 at the time of her death, as indicated by extensive wear on the teeth, as well as a bony growth inside the forehead that is also observed in modern humans, in whom it occurs after menopause.

The original find was done in a time when palaeontological dating was still in its infancy, and no stratigraphic information was supplied with the skull, making dating at best guesswork. Another specimen from a different locale on Gibraltar (Gibraltar 2) has however been dated to between 30 and 50 thousand years ago. This is the site of the most recent evidence of the Neanderthals of Gibraltar, which are claimed to have been present here until as recently as 28,000 years ago. But this is controversial (see the discussion in the article "Neanderthal").

=== Quarrying ===
The area was quarried for stone during the 19th century to supply much-needed material to reinforce and rebuild many of the fortress' fortifications. This activity removed much of the vegetated slope at the cavern's base. The cave in which the Neanderthal skull had been deposited was almost totally destroyed, leaving very little evidence for future research.

== See also ==
- List of fossil sites
