= Hanover Battery =

Former artillery battery in Gibraltar

- Part of Fortifications of Gibraltar
- Gibraltar
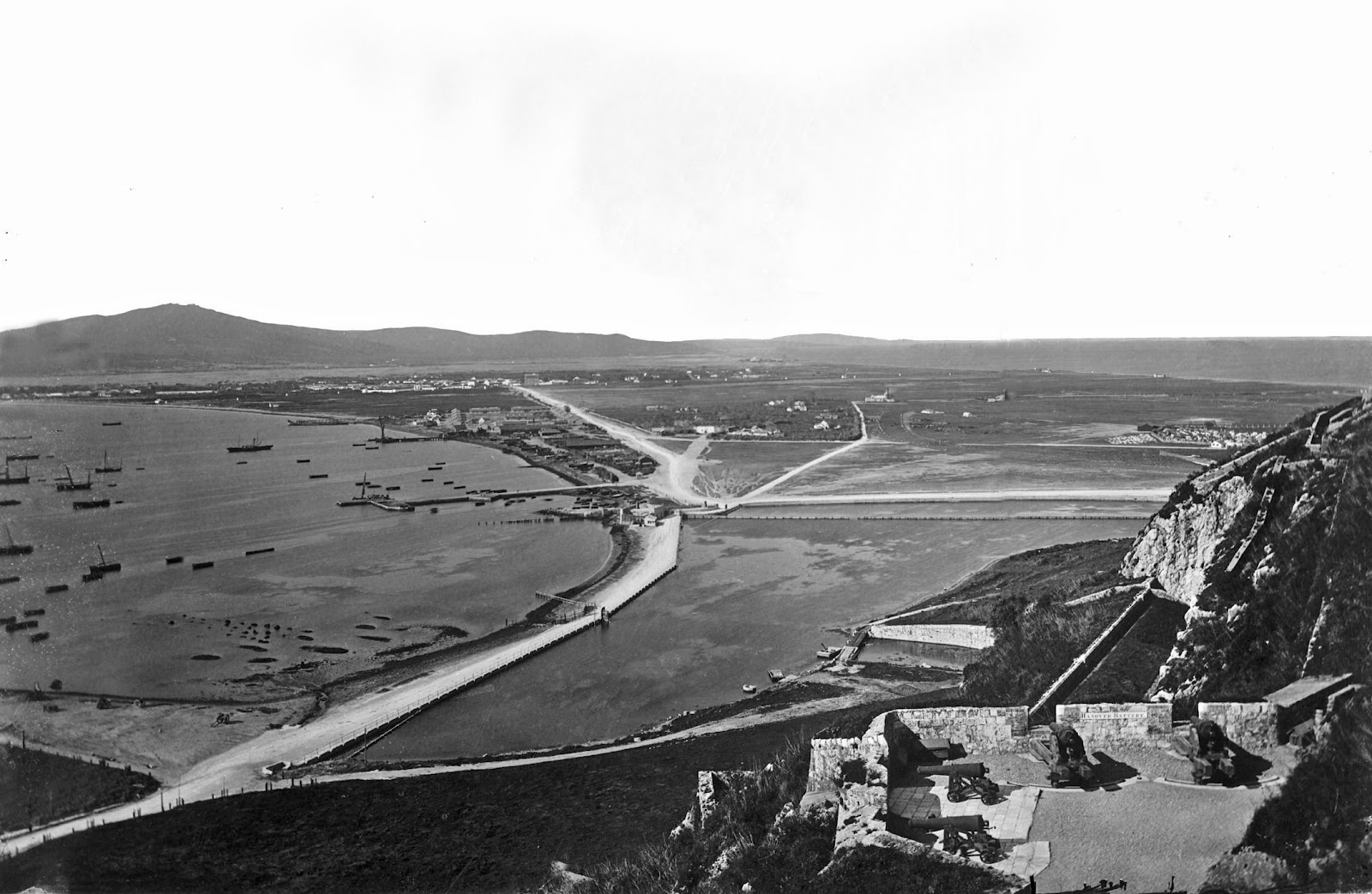
- Hanover battery by George Washington Wilson

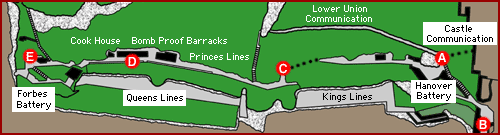
- "The Northern Defences" of Gibraltar including A Castle Communication, B Castle Batteries, C Princes Gallery, D Bombproof Barracks, E Forbes' Battery. Also Hanover Battery, a nearby Magazine, Kings, Princes and Queen's Lines and galleries.

Site information
- Type: Artillery battery
- Owner: Ministry of Defence

Location
- Coordinates: 36°08′41″N 5°21′01″W

Site history
- Battles/wars: Great Siege of Gibraltar

Hanover Battery was a casemated artillery battery on the north west part of the British Overseas Territory of Gibraltar. Beneath the battery was a tunnel known as Hanover Gallery.

== Description ==
The battery was in use in the war with Spain in 1762 when there was two 24 pound guns mounted here. The ability of the battery to give cover to troops making their way to the Kings and Queens Lines was approved by the Chief Engineer William Green in 1770. The battery gives easy access to the Princess Lines and the Princes Lines which are above the Kings And Queens lines respectively. By 1859 the two guns at Hanover Battery were assisted by additional two carronades which were also 24-pounders.

The 19th century photograph is by George Washington Wilson and it shows the battery looking north over the neutral ground that the batteries were built to fire upon (and where Gibraltar Airport will eventually be built). The battery was to the north of Queen Charlotte's Battery and the Moorish Castle.

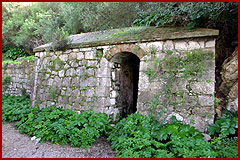
Hanover Battery had a nearby Magazine

Beneath the battery is Hanover Gallery and this is dated 1789. Both the battery and gallery were named for the Hanoverian regiments who fought as part of the defending forces during the Great Siege of Gibraltar from 1779 to 1783. The battery and gallery are part of the North Front defences of the Rock of Gibraltar together with Forbes' Battery, Couvreport Battery, Bomb Proof Battery and the tunnel system. The northern defences consist of lines or batteries known as the Queen's, King's and Princes Lines. These lines are accessed by underground galleries where soldiers could shelter or travel safely behind enemy fire.

This is a Class A listed building as designated by the Government of Gibraltar's Gibraltar Heritage Trust Act of 1989. The buildings are not open to tourists (in 2013) because of the poor state of the buildings.
