= Forbes' Batteries =

Pair of artillery batteries in Gibraltar

- Part of Fortifications of Gibraltar
- Gibraltar
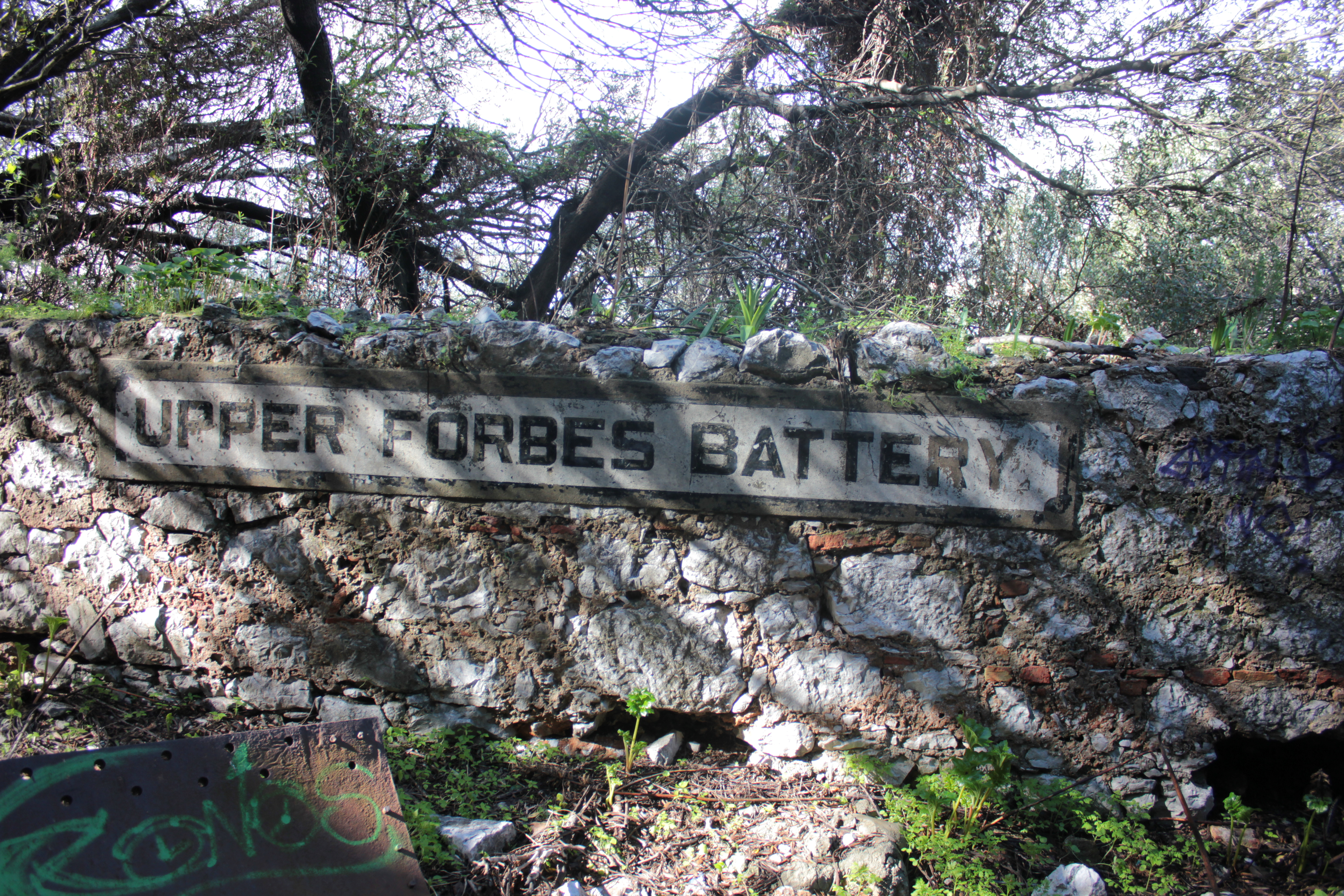
- Upper Forbes Battery

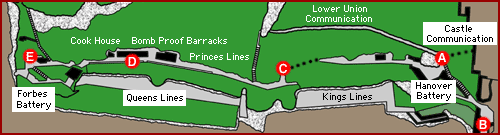
- "The Northern Defences" of Gibraltar including A Castle Communication, B Castle Batteries, C Princes Gallery, D Bombproof Barracks, E Forbes' Battery. Also Hanover Battery, a nearby Magazine, Kings, Princes and Queen's Lines and galleries.

Site information
- Type: Artillery batteries
- Owner: Government of Gibraltar

Location
- Location in Gibraltar
- Coordinates: 36.147081°N 5.346779°W

Forbes' Batteries are a pair of artillery batteries in the British Overseas Territory of Gibraltar. The batteries are casemated.

== Description ==
The Forbes' Batteries are on the eastern end of the Northern Defences. These batteries had five guns arranged on two levels. There is a famous quarry behind the batteries which shares the same name.

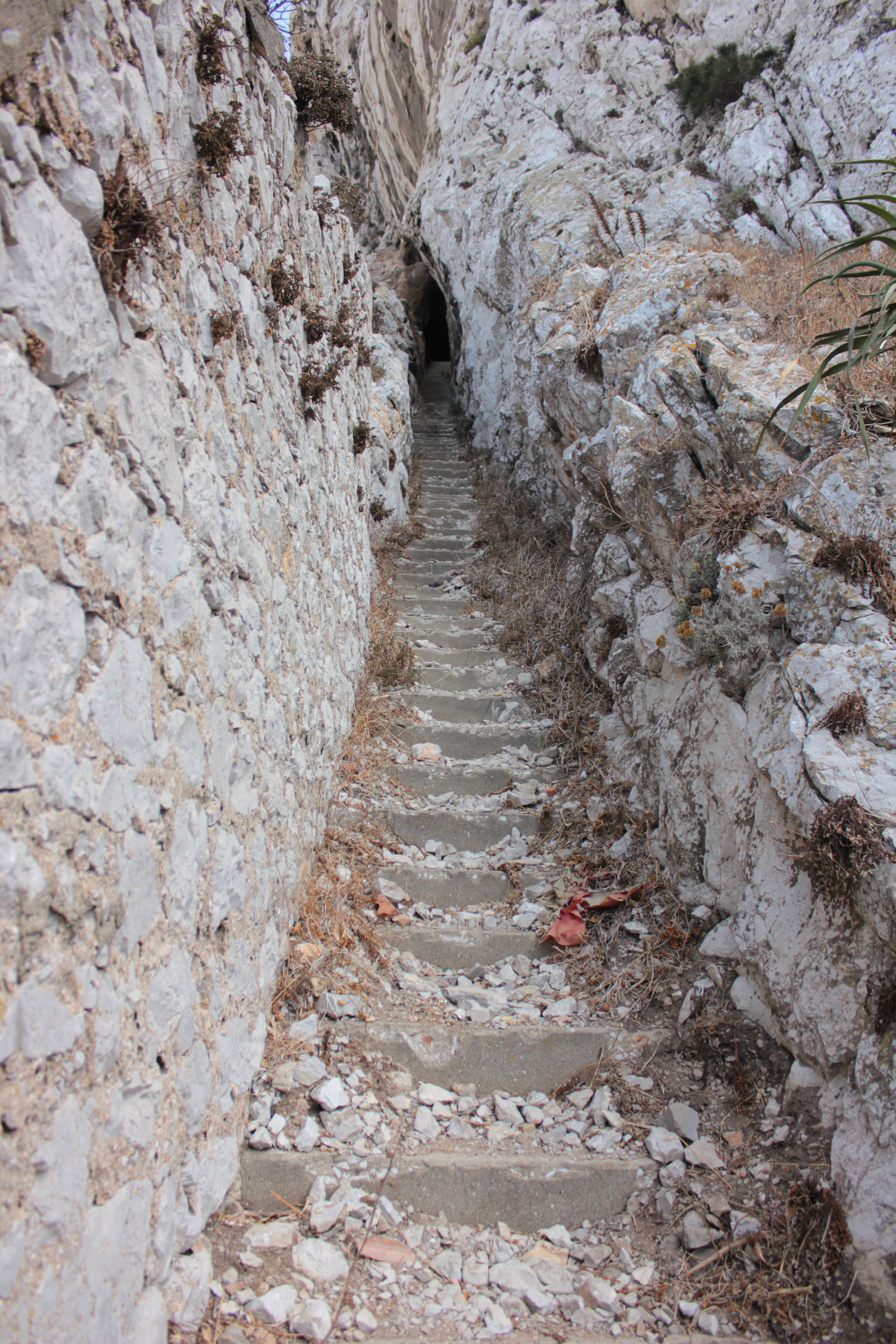
Stairs up to Forbes Lookout and Upper All's Well

This complex group of fortifications is located at the end of Princes Lines and was named after Lt. George Forbes RN, ADC to Prince George of Hesse-Darmstadt, third Earl of Granard (1685-1765) who took part as a midshipman in the attack of 1704 and who fought on shore in the siege of 1727.

In 1727 the battery mounted two 6-pdr guns. In 1761 the British constructed Upper and Lower Forbes' Batteries.

Upper Forbes' Battery has two fine magazines, one brick and one stone, built against the cliff wall. Above the two batteries is Forbes' Lookout. During the Second World War a 40-mm Mark 3 gun on a mobile mounting was placed in Upper Forbes Battery in 1942 and remained there until December 1944. A Second World War iron cupola cantilevered out from the rock face housed a searchlight.
