= Bomb Proof Barracks and Battery =

Artillery battery in Gibraltar

Bomb Proof Battery
- Part of Fortifications of Gibraltar
- Gibraltar
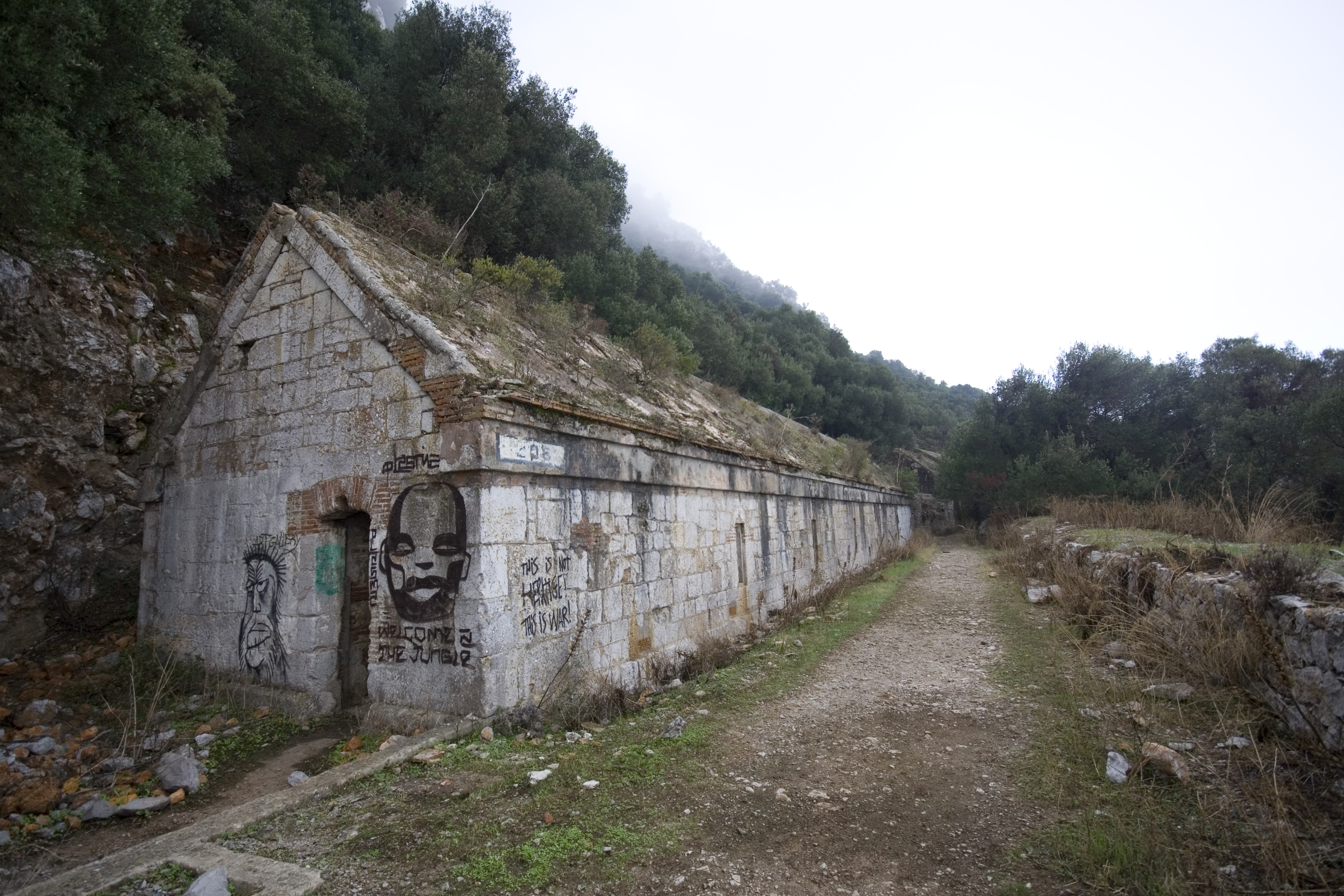
- Bomb Proof Barracks

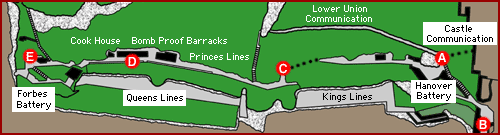
- "The Northern Defences" of Gibraltar including A Castle Communication, B Castle Batteries, C Princes Gallery, D Bombproof Barracks, E Forbes' Battery. Also Hanover Battery, a nearby Magazine, Kings, Princes and Queen's Lines and galleries.

Site information
- Type: Artillery battery
- Owner: Ministry of Defence

Location
- Location in Gibraltar
- Coordinates: 36.145096°N 5.35077°W

Bomb Proof Battery was an artillery battery near Bomb Proof Barracks in the British Overseas Territory of Gibraltar. The battery was located at the south end of the King's Lines on the north-west face of the Rock of Gibraltar. It comprised a casemated battery built on two levels, each of which had two embrasures built into the old Spanish defences constructed above the then Puerta de Villavieja some time in the 16th century. The battery was partly built over when the King's Lines Battery was constructed.

It was recorded as housing one 18-pdr (8.1 kg) and one 4-pdr (1.8 kg) in 1781, two 18-pdrs and one 24-pdr (10.9 kg) carronade in 1834, two 24-pdrs in 1859 and two 12-pdrs (5.4 kg) in 1885. It was re-equipped during the Second World War with a 25-pdr (11.3 kg) installed in 1941 and a 17-pdr (7.7 kg) anti-tank gun installed in 1943.
