= Couvreport Battery =

Artillery battery in Gibraltar

- Part of Fortifications of Gibraltar
- Gibraltar
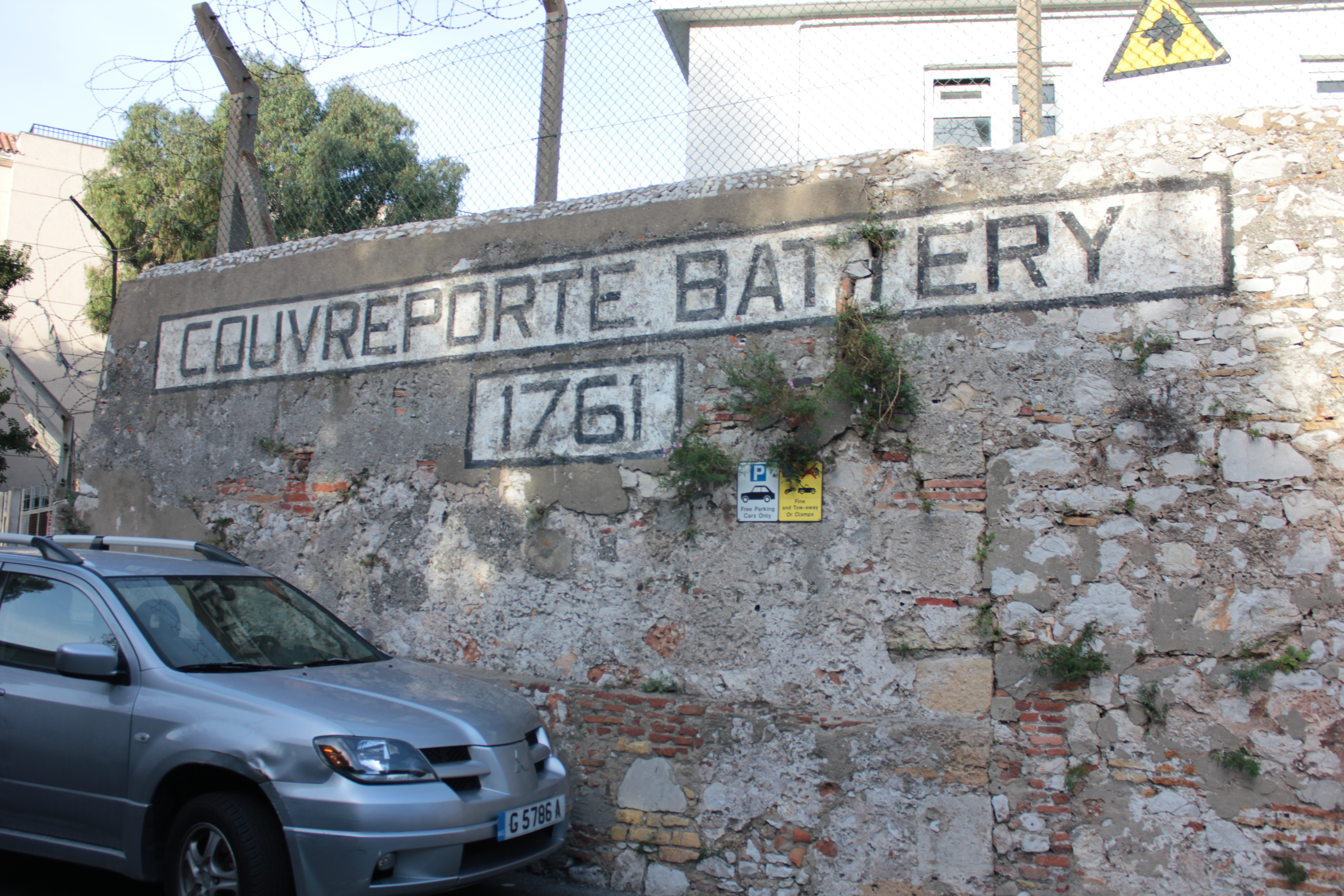
- Couvreporte Battery

Site information
- Type: Artillery battery
- Owner: Ministry of Defence

Location
- Location in Gibraltar
- Coordinates: 36.145489°N 5.35116°W

Couvreport Battery is an artillery battery in the British Overseas Territory of Gibraltar.

== Description ==
It was established in 1761 when the Couvre Port Work, covering Landport, was re-formed, and a battery for three guns was created. The work was commission by Major William Green which as based on the "first system" which had been devised by Sébastien Le Prestre de Vauban in the 1680s. This battery was shaped like a ravelin as it was intended to divide any invading army.

According to Fa and Finlayson, "a small defensive work [was] set immediately in front of a gate so as to screen it."

Couvreport Battery is a Class A listed building as designated by the Government of Gibraltar's Gibraltar Heritage Trust Act of 1989.
