= Moorish Castle =

Medieval fortification in Gibraltar

The Moorish Castle
- Part of Fortifications of Gibraltar
- Extends from the Gibraltar Nature Reserve to Grand Casemates Square in Gibraltar
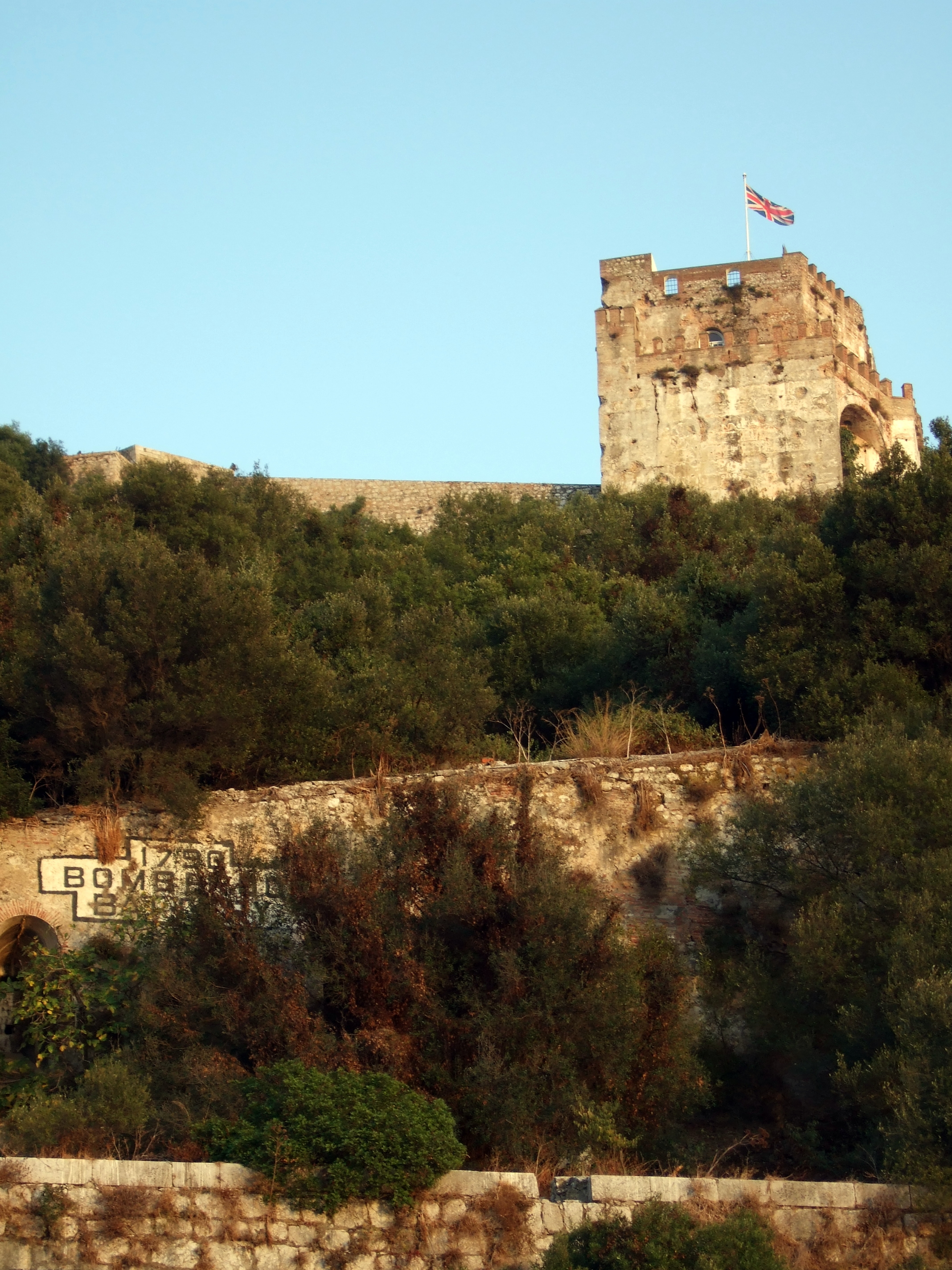
- The Moorish Castle's Tower of Homage in Gibraltar flying the Union Flag.

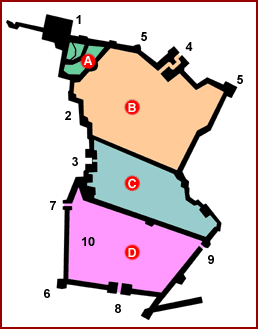
- 1. Inner and outer keep 2. Qasbah; 3. Villa Vieja; 4. Port (Barcina); 1. Tower of Homage; 2. Flanking Wall; 3. Gate of Granada; 4. Gatehouse; 5. Tower; 6. Giralda Tower (North Bastion); 7. Landport; 8. Sea Gate (Grand Casemates Gates); 9. Barcina Gate; 10. Galley House

Site information
- Type: Castle
- Owner: Government of Gibraltar
- Controlled by: Moors: 711–1309; Castilians: 1309—1333; Moors: 1333–1462; Castilians: 1462–1704; Habsburgs: 1704–1713; British: 1713–present
- Open to the public: Yes
- Condition: Partially ruined

Location
- Location of the Moorish Castle's Tower of Homage within Gibraltar.
- Coordinates: 36.143882°N 5.349857°W
- Height: Approx. 100 metres (330 ft)

Site history
- Built: c. 711
- In use: c. 711–1945

The Moorish Castle is the name given to a medieval fortification in Gibraltar comprising various buildings, gates, and fortified walls, with the dominant features being the Tower of Homage and the Gate House. Part of the castle itself also housed the prison of Gibraltar until it was relocated in 2010. The Tower of Homage is clearly visible to all visitors to Gibraltar; not only because of its striking construction, but also because of its dominant and strategic position. Although sometimes compared to the nearby alcazars in Spain, the Moorish Castle in Gibraltar was constructed by the Marinid dynasty, making it unique in the Iberian Peninsula.

== History ==
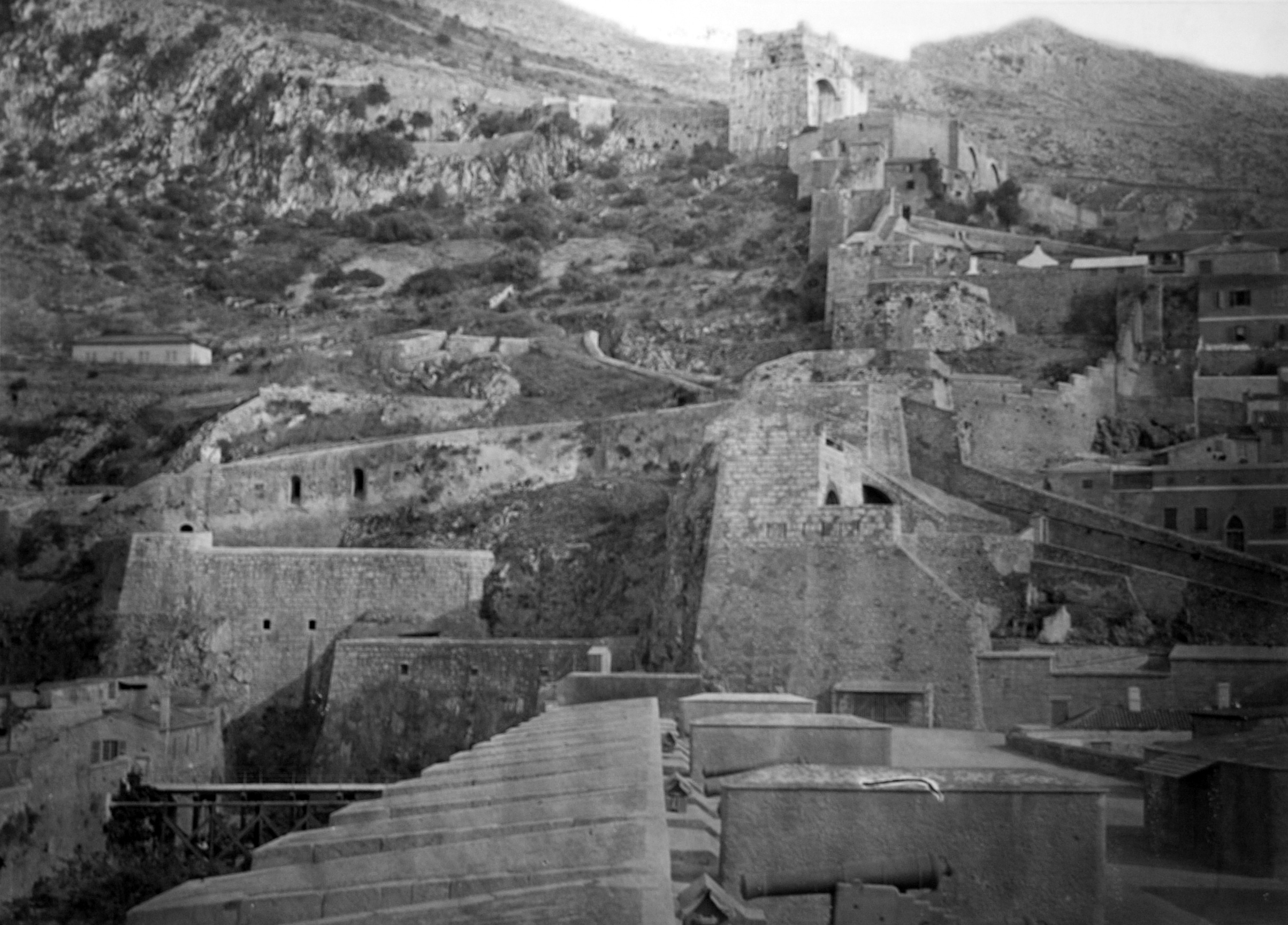
View of the Moorish Castle's northern defences as seen from the Grand Battery in 1879

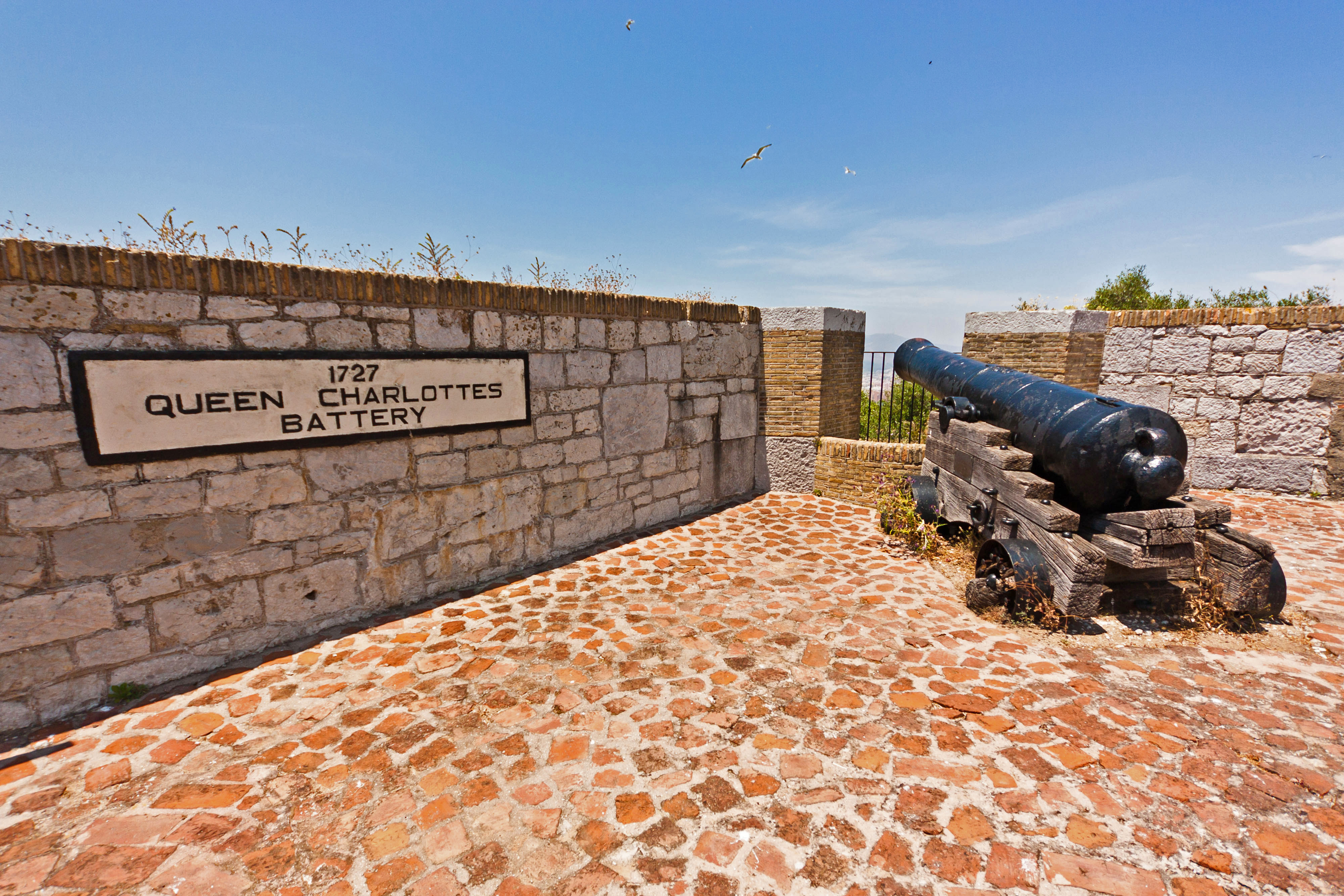
Queen Charlotte's Battery at the Moorish Castle.

Gibraltar has always been of special significance to the numerous peoples and civilizations that have visited or occupied it over the ages, from the Neanderthal period, through the Classical and on to Muslim, Spanish, and the current British rule.

The Muslim occupation is by far the longest in Gibraltar's recorded history, having lasted from 711 to 1309 and then again from 1333 to 1462, a total of 727 years.

The Moorish conquest of Iberia was led by Tarik ibn Ziyad and Musa ibn Nusayr, who may have landed in Europe at or near Gibraltar. Gibraltar thus became the stepping-stone to the Moorish conquests of most of Iberia and part of France. This spectacular feat of arms took a mere twenty-one years, no mean task considering the distances and terrain involved, and the fact that mechanical transport on land was not then in use. The strategic importance of Gibraltar rose in the last years of the Moorish rule, when, after the successful Spanish reconquest of the entire Guadalquivir valley, Gibraltar became one of the key elements in communication between the Emirate of Granada and Moorish domains in northwestern Africa.

Construction of the Moorish Castle commenced in the 8th century AD (possibly AD 711); the date of its completion is not recorded. Its walls enclosed a considerable area, reaching down from the upper part of the Rock of Gibraltar to the sea. The most conspicuous remaining parts of the Castle are the upper tower, or Tower of Homage, together with various terraces and battlements below it, and the massive Gate House, with its cupola roof.

== The Tower of Homage ==
The Tower of Homage is the highest tower of the period of Islamic rule in the Iberian Peninsula, and the Qasbah of the Castle is the largest in the area. The Castle itself played a prominent part in the Muslim invasion of the Iberian Peninsula, with Muslim forces overrunning a large portion of it in two years – an invasion which led to Islamic domination of parts of western Europe for more than seven centuries. It is therefore of historic significance not only for Gibraltar and Iberia, but also for all of western Europe.

The present Tower of Homage, and most of what is visible today of the Castle, was rebuilt during the second Moorish period of occupation in the early 14th century, after its near destruction during a reconquest of Gibraltar by the Moors following a re-occupation by Spanish forces from 1309 to 1333.

== Present day ==
Today the Moorish Castle is one of the major tourist attractions of Gibraltar, and it is shown on the reverse of the 1995 design (still in circulation) of the Gibraltar five-pound banknote.

The name "Moorish Castle" (or "El Castillo" in Spanish) is also used locally when referring to the residential area surrounding the Castle, location of the Moorish Castle Estate.

Part of the castle itself housed the prison of Gibraltar until the prison was relocated in 2010.

== See also ==
- Moorish Gibraltar
- Moorish Wall
- History of Gibraltar
