= St. Jago's Arch =

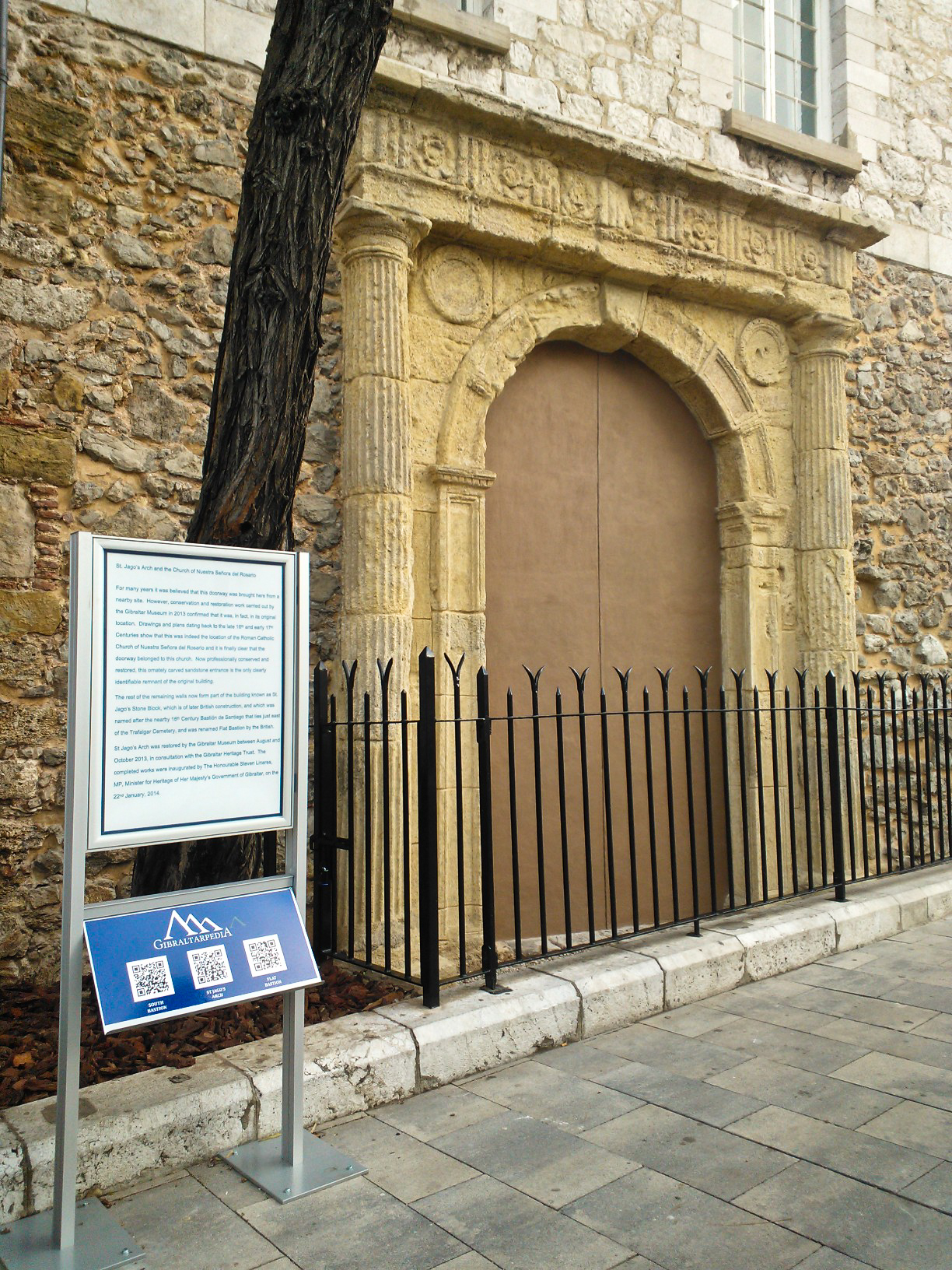
- St. Jago's Arch in Gibraltar with interpretation panel
- Interactive map of St. Jago's Arch
- Location: St. Jago's Barracks, Main Street, Gibraltar
- Coordinates: 36.1351°N 5.3529°W
- Type: Arch
- Material: Sandstone
- Completion date: 16th century
- Dedicated to: Our Lady of the Rosary

St. Jago's Arch is a historic sandstone arch in the British Overseas Territory of Gibraltar. It is the original entrance to a 16th-century Spanish church located at the southern limits of the old town.

== History ==
The ornate sandstone arch is set into the western façade of St. Jago's Barracks at the southern end of Main Street, near Southport Gates. The arch is all that remains of the 16th century Spanish Hermitage of Our Lady of the Rosary (Spanish: Ermita de Nuestra Señora del Rosario). When the British converted the church into military stores, following the 1704 Capture of Gibraltar, the arch was kept and set into the façade of the larger barracks. It was once thought that the arch had been relocated to St. Jago's Barracks from the Spanish: Iglesia de Nuestra Señora de la Cabeza (Church of Our Lady of the Head) in Villa Vieja (Old Town), within the precinct of the Moorish Castle, but it has since been proven that this was a misunderstanding and that the arch has always been in situ. Anton van den Wyngaerde's 1567 detailed panoramic sketch of Gibraltar and its bay depicts the Hermitage of Our Lady of the Rosary at the southern limits of the city walls.

== Conservation ==
St. Jago's Arch is defined as a Category B Listed Structure by the Government of Gibraltar under section 40 of the Gibraltar Heritage Trust Act of 1989. On 26 June 2013, Minister for Culture and Heritage Steven Linares MP, announced in his budget speech that a conservation project being carried out on the walls surrounding Southport Gates was being extended to include the restoration of St. Jago's Arch. The project will include information and lighting of the monument.

== Gallery ==
St. Jago's Arch
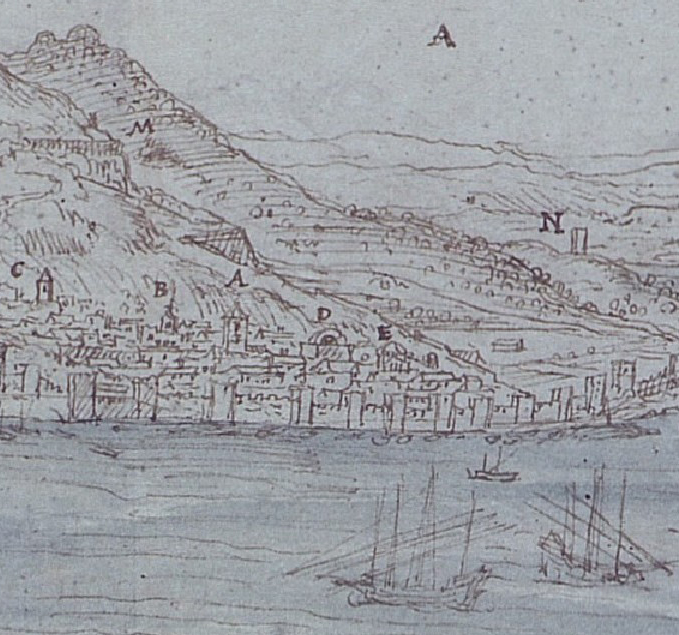
Hermitage of Our Lady of the Rosary labelled 'E' in Anton van den Wyngaerde's 1567 sketch

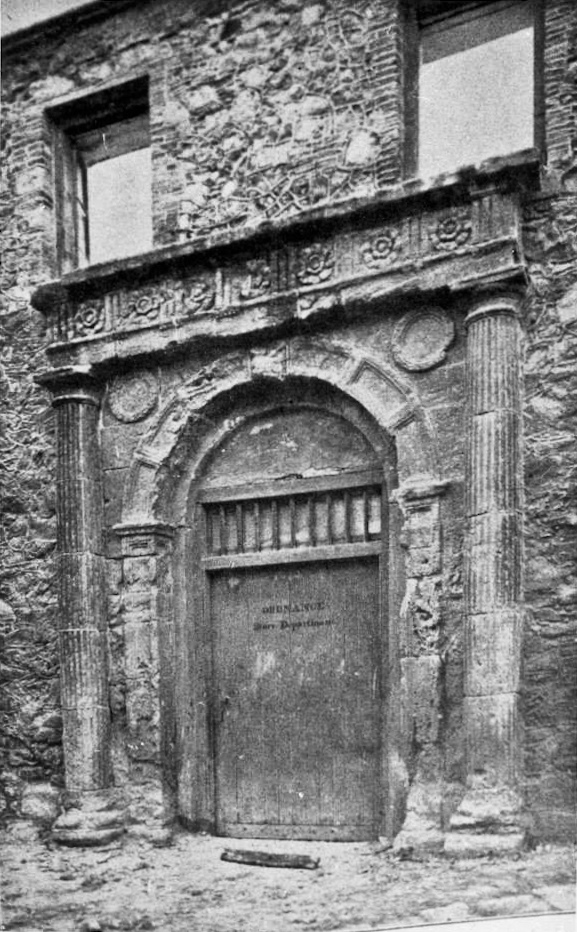
St. Jago's Arch c. 1900

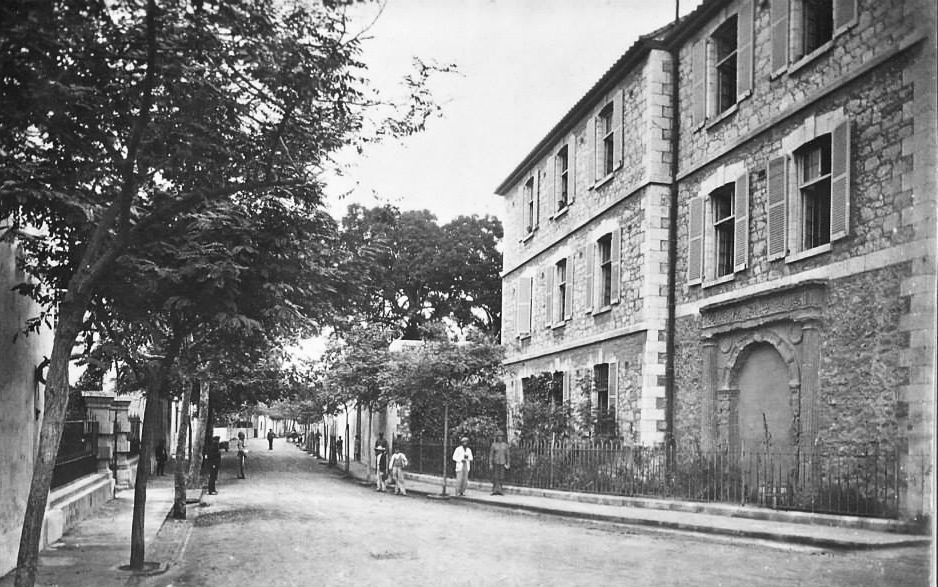
St. Jago's Arch in 1920

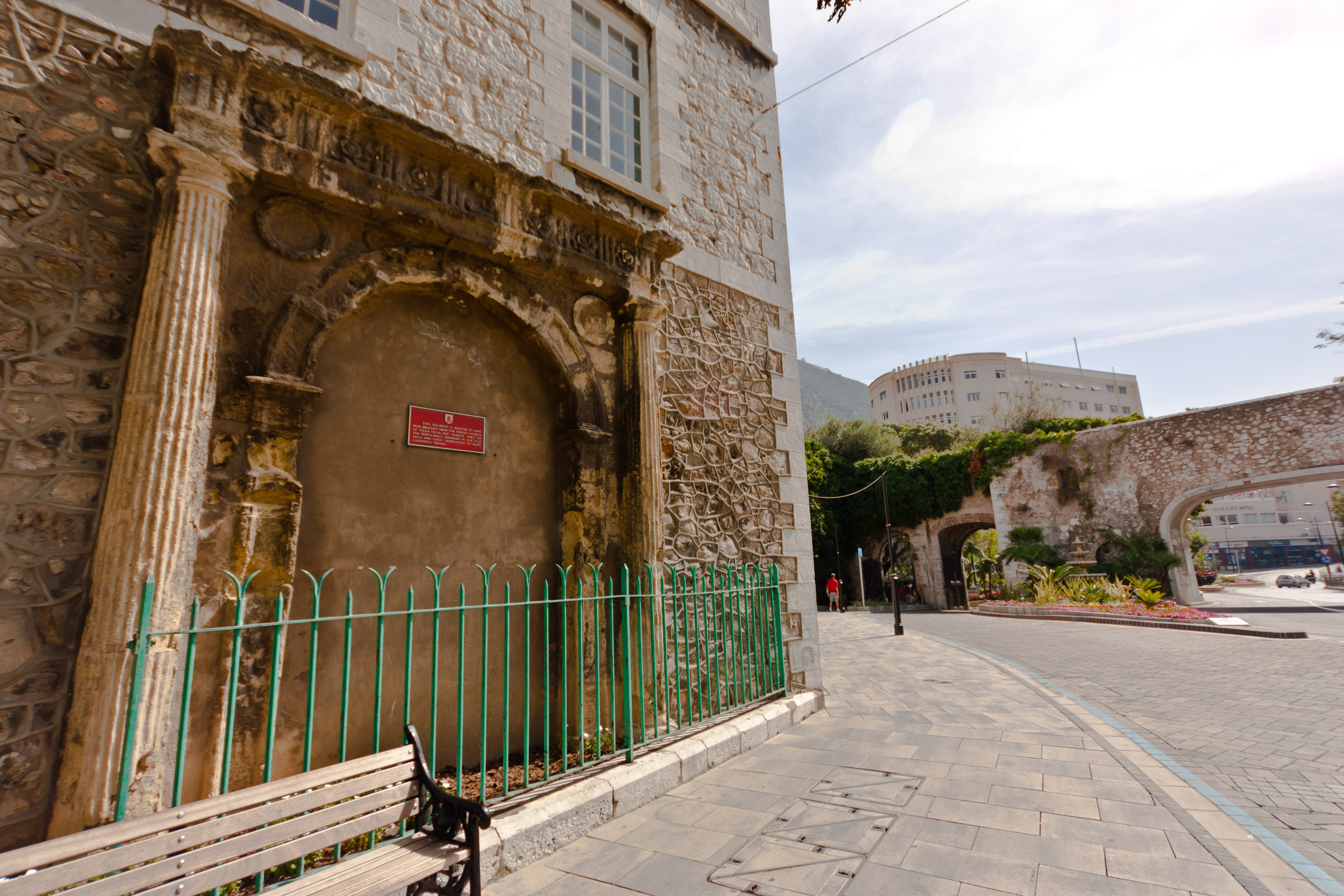
St. Jago's Arch with Southport Gates in the background in 2010
