= Orillon =

Architectural element of a military fortification

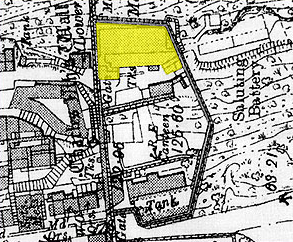
At the lower edge of the 1908 OS map of the Flat Bastion in Gibraltar is an orillon covering a retired flank and the Prince Edward's Gate in the Charles V Wall.

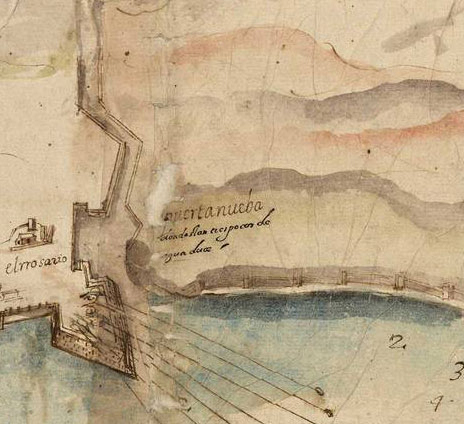
The Flat Bastion (upper) and South Bastion (lower) on the Charles V Wall. Each has an orillon and a retired flank.

An orillon, also known as an orillion, is an architectural element of a military fortification. The ear-shaped projection of masonry provided defense for guns and soldiers at the flank of a bastion. However, an orillon could also shield a city gate.

== Description ==
An orillon (link below), sometimes referred to as an orillion, is an architectural element of a fortification. It is an ear-shaped masonry projection from the end of the face of a bastion. The curve of an orillon is convex and it may be semi-circular or squared-off in shape. It provides defense for guns and soldiers on the flank, and may cover a retired flank. The French orillon (English: little ear) is a diminutive which derives from the French oreille (English: ear).

An orillon was generally built at the flank of a bastion, close to the adjacent defensive wall. The position permitted the cannons to be set back into the bastion. The projecting masonry shielded the gun and soldiers. Additional protection was sometimes provided by lowering the gun platform in the bastion (link below). An orillon could also shield a city gate. An example is the Prince Edward's Gate (pictured in map at right) in the Charles V Wall in the British Overseas Territory of Gibraltar.

Examples of bastions that have orillons include the Flat Bastion (Spanish: Baluarte de Santiago) and the South Bastion (Spanish: Baluarte de Nuestra Señora del Rosario) in Gibraltar. The two bastions along the Charles V Wall each have an orillon and a retired flank on their opposing faces, the west wall for the Flat Bastion and the east wall for the South Bastion (pictured at right). Usually, however, orillons were built on both flanks of a bastion.
