= Flat Bastion =

Bastion in Gibraltar

- Baluarte de Santiago (formerly)
- Part of Fortifications of Gibraltar
- Charles V Wall, Gibraltar in Gibraltar
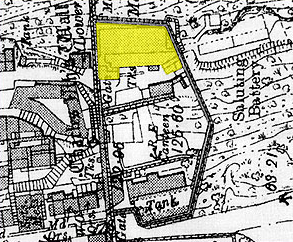
- Section of the 1908 Ordnance Survey map of Gibraltar showing Flat Bastion. Note retired flank and orillon on west wall. Flat Bastion Magazine is highlighted in yellow. North is to the left.

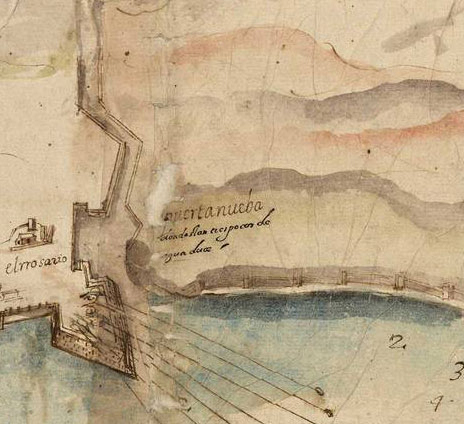
- Section of 1608 map by Cristóbal de Rojas includes South Bastion and Flat Bastion, each with an orillon and a retired flank.

Site information
- Type: Bastion
- Owner: Government of Gibraltar
- Open to the public: Partly
- Condition: Mostly derelict

Location
- Location of Flat Bastion within Gibraltar.
- Coordinates: 36°08′05″N 5°21′05″W

Site history
- Materials: Masonry

Flat Bastion is a bastion which projects southward from the Charles V Wall in the British Overseas Territory of Gibraltar. Once known as the St. Jago's Bastion or the Baluarte de Santiago in Spanish, the fortification was built by the Spanish in the mid 16th century and formed part of the southern defences of the city of Gibraltar, together with Charles V Wall, Southport Gates, Southport Ditch, and South Bastion. In 1859, six guns, four 12-pounders (Note: 12 pounds is equivalent to 5.44311 kg) and two 12-pound carronades, were installed on the bastion, and four years later, five 32-pounders (Note: 32 pounds is equivalent to 14.515 kg) were mounted on the fortification.

Flat Bastion takes its name from the angle that its south-facing walls form with each other and with the Charles V Wall. Within the eastern portion of Flat Bastion is Flat Bastion Magazine. The bastion and magazine within it are separately listed with the Gibraltar Heritage Trust. The magazine has been restored and converted into a research facility.

== Background ==
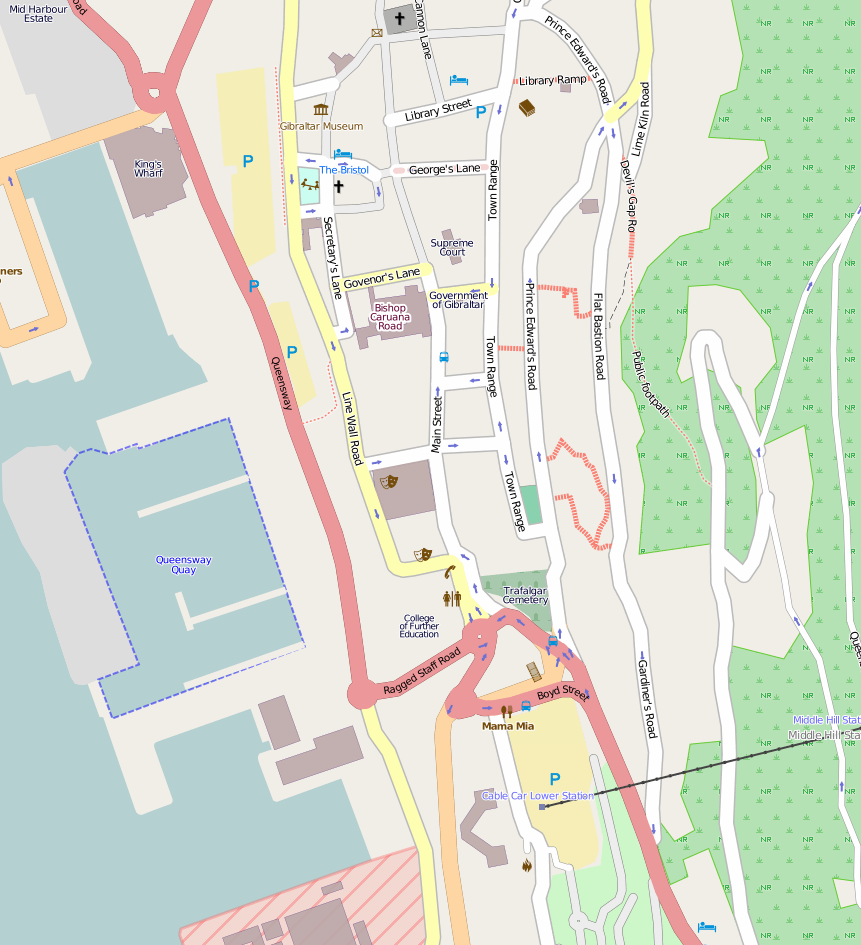
Map of Gibraltar. The bastion is just to the east of the cemetery.

Flat Bastion is a fortification in the British Overseas Territory of Gibraltar. Its north end is along the Charles V Wall, from which it projects southward. Prince Edward's Gate, Prince Edward's Road, and Trafalgar Cemetery are just to the west of the bastion. Flat Bastion Road extends to the bastion at the east side of its north face at the Charles V Wall and traverses the bastion at which point it becomes Gardiner's Road.

The name of the bastion refers to the faces of the fortification and not to the slope of the ground on which it was built; Flat Bastion was constructed on sloping ground. A 1908 map of the Flat Bastion confirms that its south faces join at an obtuse angle which is relatively flat, and nearly parallel to the Charles V Wall. Flat Bastion includes Flat Bastion Magazine within its eastern portion, now a geological research and exhibition facility. The bastion is a listed building with the Gibraltar Heritage Trust. While St. Jago's Bastion has been said to be an early name for Flat Bastion, it has a separate listing with the Gibraltar Heritage Trust, next to those for Flat Bastion and Flat Bastion Magazine.

== History and features ==
The Spanish began construction of Flat Bastion in the 16th century, in 1552, at which time it was referred to as St. Jago's or Santiago's Bastion (Spanish: Baluarte de Santiago). According to Dr. Darren Fa and Professor Clive Finlayson, both of the Gibraltar Museum, Flat Bastion was built by 1627. He speculated that Alsatian fortress architect and cartographer Daniel Specklin (1536–1589) may have designed it, as its outline was essentially identical to that in the architect's book, including the presence of a retired flank. An earlier 1608 map of Gibraltar by Cristóbal de Rojas includes Flat Bastion and South Bastion, although the British claimed that the Spanish had never finished the construction of Flat Bastion.

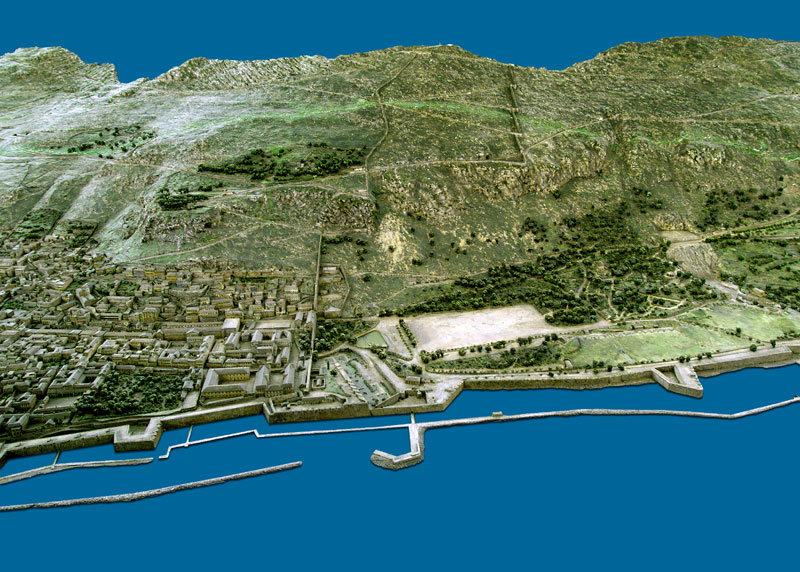
Model of Gibraltar (1865) demonstrates the Charles V Wall to the left of center. Along and on the right (south side) of the wall, from front to back, are included: South Bastion (extending into the harbour), Southport Gates, Trafalgar Cemetery, Prince Edward's Gate, and Flat Bastion.

In 1859, six guns—four 12-pounders and two 12-pound carronades—were installed on the bastion, and four years later, five 32-pounders were mounted on the fortification. The earliest defences of the southern end of the city of Gibraltar included the 16th century Charles V Wall, Flat Bastion, South Bastion, Southport Gate, and Southport Ditch. The complex of defences also included Southport Ditch which was depicted in the 1627 map of Gibraltar by Spanish engineer Luis Bravo de Acuña. On that map which is held by the British Museum, the ditch is shown as a Fosso south of Southport Gate. It was a large trench which extended from the southwestern aspect of the 16th century South Bastion to the Flat Bastion at Prince Edward's Gate. The width of the ditch is now indicated by that of Ragged Staff Gates, which initially served as a water gate. By the late 19th century, the ditch was utilised as an ordnance depot, with a magazine constructed in the 1880s. However, by the early 20th century, that same magazine was used as a pump house. After World War I and reclamation of land, the Ragged Staff Gates were opened to vehicular traffic. Gibraltar's Sunken Gardens, a 19th-century market garden, were a remnant of the western portion of the Southport Ditch, and were filled in at the time of the 1967 Referendum Gate. Trafalgar Cemetery represents an eastern remnant of the ditch.

== Gates ==
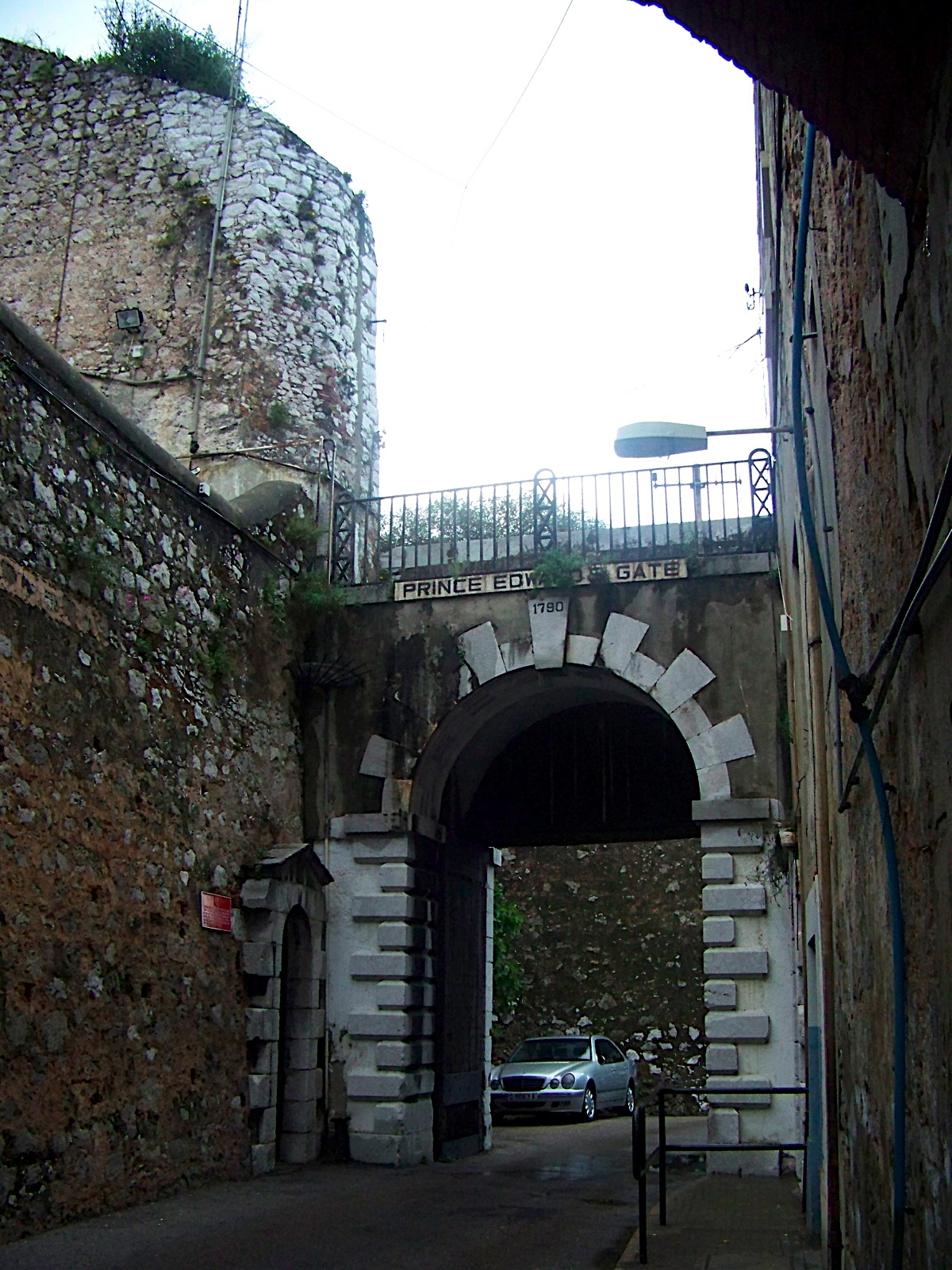
North side of Prince Edward's Gate at the Charles V Wall, with sentry box and plaque at left

Flat Bastion and South Bastion (Spanish: Baluarte de Nuestra Señora del Rosario) were elements in the defence of the Africa Gate (Puerta de Africa), now Southport Gates. Southport Gate is the smallest of a trio of gates, west of Flat Bastion and adjacent to Trafalgar Cemetery, that are known as the Southport Gates. That smallest gate was the first of the three and was constructed by Italian engineer Giovanni Battista Calvi at the same time that he designed the Charles V Wall, in 1552. The gate in the middle of the trio is ornamented with the arms of Queen Victoria and Governor of Gibraltar General Sir John Miller Adye and was built in 1883. The third gate is the largest and was constructed in 1967. Entitled the Referendum Gate, it commemorates the votes cast by Gibraltarians in their sovereignty referendum of 1967. Southport Gates are listed with the Gibraltar Heritage Trust.

Prince Edward's Gate extends from the northwest corner of the bastion and overlooks Trafalgar Cemetery to the southwest and the former St. Jago's Cemetery to the northwest. It was constructed adjacent to the retired flank and behind the orillon of the bastion's west wall, which aided the gate's defence. The gate was named after Prince Edward, Duke of Kent and Strathearn. At the time the gate was opened in the Charles V Wall, in 1790, the prince was serving with the military in Gibraltar. Prince Edward's Gate is listed with the Gibraltar Heritage Trust.

== Flat Bastion Magazine ==
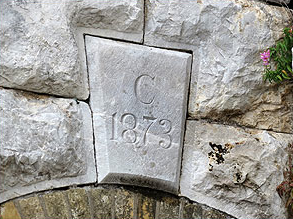
The Flat Bastion Magazine dates back to at least 1873.

The 1908 Ordnance Survey map of Gibraltar reveals Flat Bastion Magazine within the east side of the bastion. The British version of the magazine dates back to at least 1873, as documented on a keystone above one of the magazine's doorways (pictured right). It is considered likely that a magazine was present at that site previously. The magazine was constructed on scree breccia, with underlying limestone bedrock. The road through the bastion is positioned just to the west of the magazine.

The British magazine was constructed to store about five thousands barrels of gunpowder. The main area has been described as a "room within a room" as it is surrounded by a narrow hallway. Numerous wood supports are still present in the magazine. The walls of the magazine were built with bricks to help absorb the impact of explosions. In addition, the oak doors of the magazine date back five or six centuries, well before the British version of the magazine.

Flat Bastion Magazine had been abandoned for years when geology enthusiast Freddie Gomez undertook its restoration. Gomez, whose interests include both history and geology, converted the magazine to a geological research facility and exhibition centre. While much of the contents of the large collection of rocks and minerals are from his collection, other specimens have been donated. The men of the 150 (Yorkshire) Transport Regiment also spent a day performing repairs at the magazine. Gomez aspires to open the site to the public.

The Gibraltar Heritage Trust has presented the Gibraltar Heritage Award annually since 1993. In 2001, the restoration of the Flat Bastion Magazine earned Gomez the 2001 award for "his enthusiasm and single-minded dedication to the restoration and preservation of Flat Bastion Magazine." Flat Bastion Magazine is also listed with the Gibraltar Heritage Trust (in addition to the listing for the bastion itself).

== Gallery ==
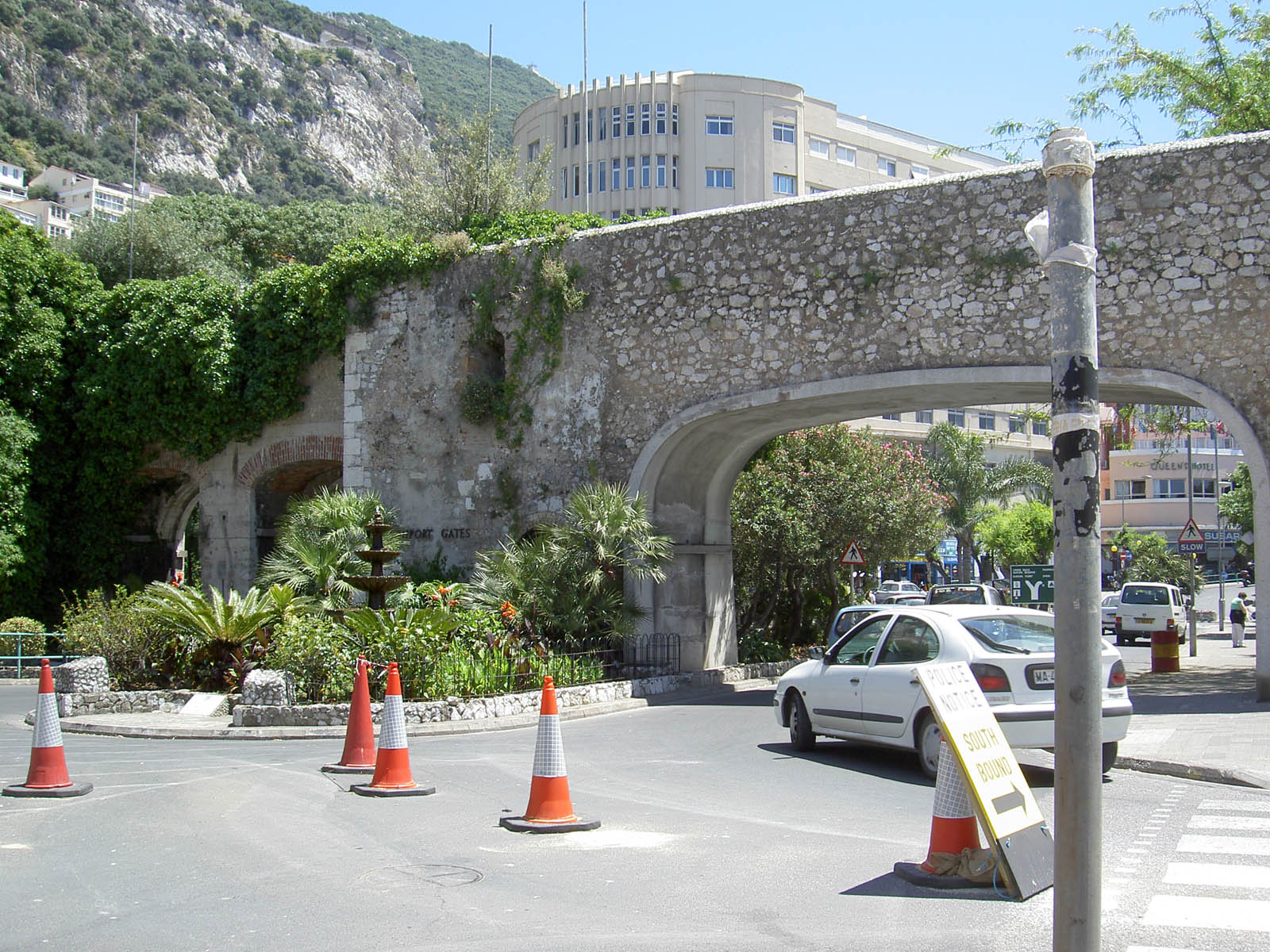
Three Southport Gates

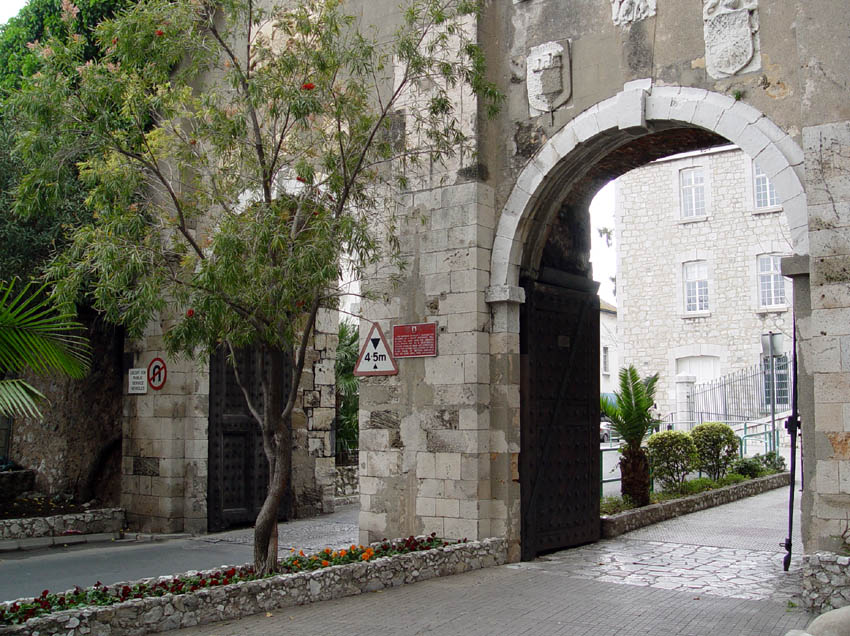
New and Old Southport Gates

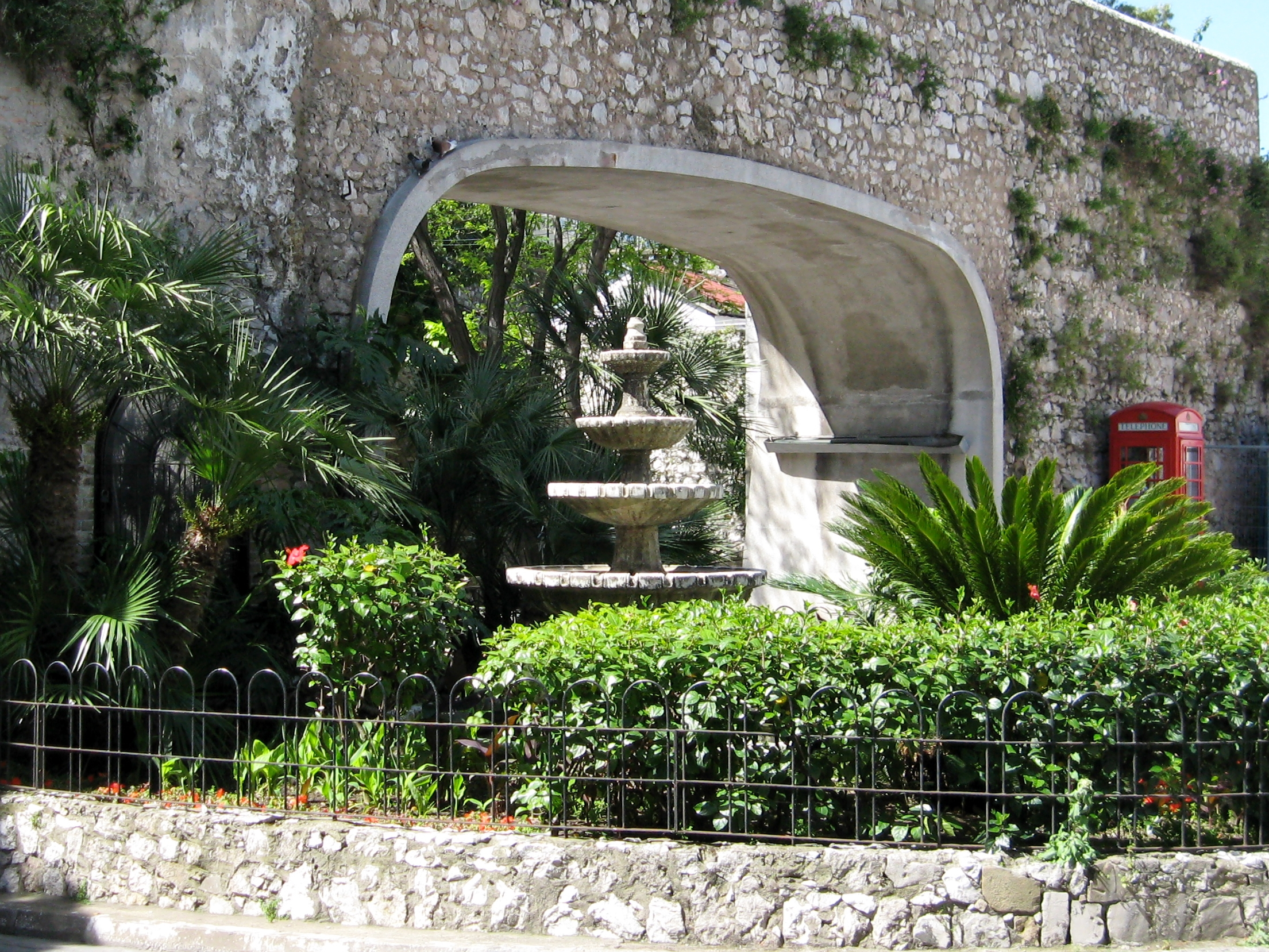
Referendum Gate
