= Flat Bastion Road =

Road in Gibraltar

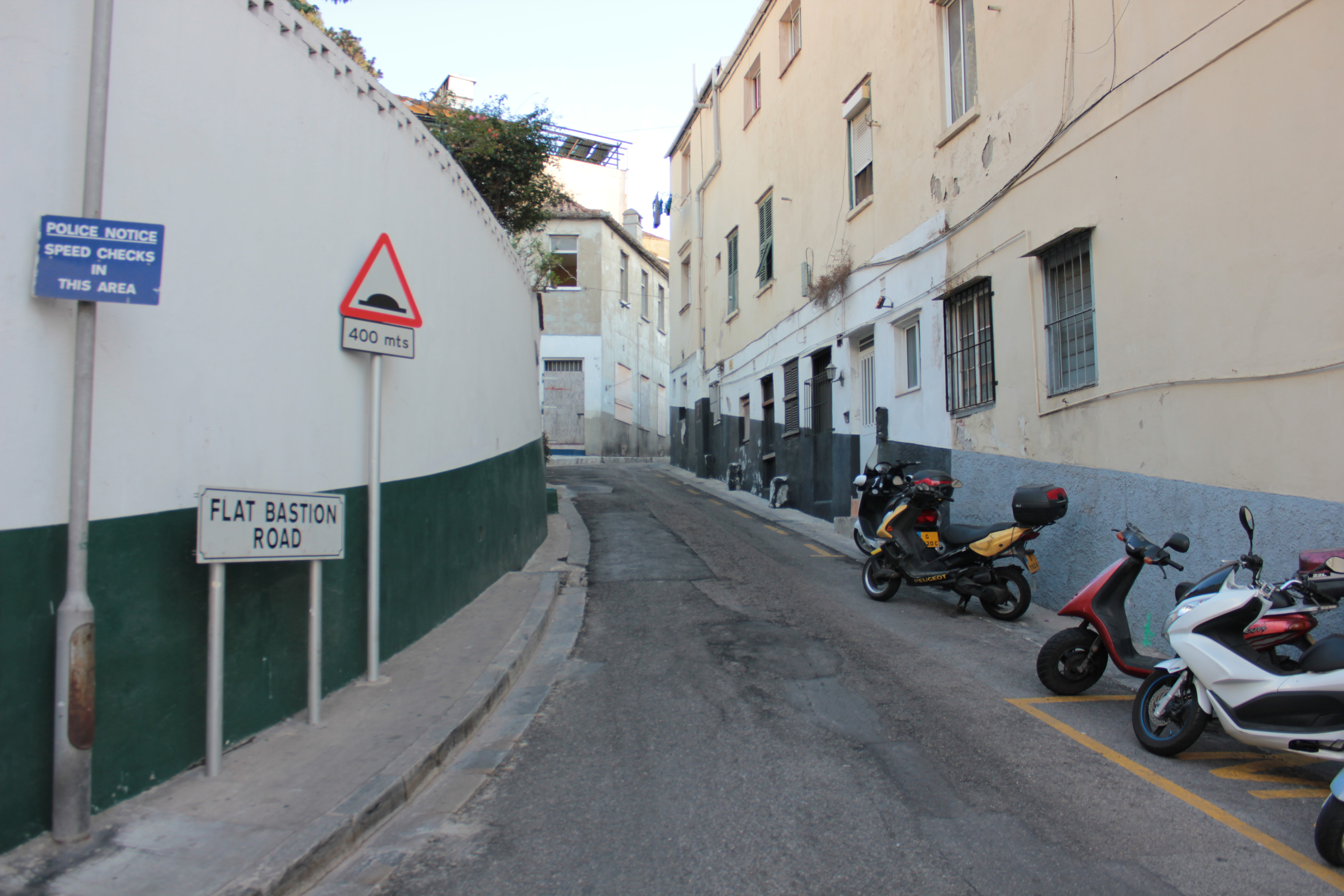
- Interactive map of Flat Bastion Road
- Native name: Senda del Moro (Spanish); Cuesta de Mr. Bourne (Llanito)
- Location: Gibraltar
- Coordinates: 36.137931°N 5.351302°W
- North: Prince Edward's Road; Castle Road
- East: Devil's Gap Road
- South: Gardiner's Road
- West: Wilson's Ramp; Morello's Ramp; Charles V Ramp

Flat Bastion Road is a road in Gibraltar, the British Overseas Territory at the southern end of the Iberian Peninsula. The road runs north–south, providing views of the city and Bay of Gibraltar. Previously known in Spanish as Senda del Moro (English: Path of the Moor), the traditional Llanito name for the road is Cuesta de Mr. Bourne.

The road angles along the west side of the Rock of Gibraltar to the Flat Bastion, a fortification. Married quarters were built along the road. In the nineteenth century there were outbreaks of yellow fever in the 1820s and of diphtheria in the 1880s among the residents, apparently due to faulty sewers. Developments included, in the 1830s a school for poor children which remained in use as a school into the early twentieth century and a club where masked balls were held. In modern times the bastion's magazine has been refurbished for civilian use, the barracks have been converted into affordable housing, and parking has become an issue.

== Background ==
Flat Bastion Road begins to the southeast of the Garrison Library, at the intersection of Prince Edward's Road and Castle Road, north of its junction with Devil's Gap Road. Proceeding in a southerly direction, it becomes Gardiner's Road as it passes through Charles V Wall, just before it reaches Europa Road.

The road runs along the west side of the Rock of Gibraltar, leading to the Flat Bastion fortification. The original Flat Bastion, then called Baluarte de Santiago (Santiago's Bastion), was built by the Spanish some time between 1565 and 1627. It may have been designed by Daniel Specklin. It was one of the fortifications along the Charles V Wall that protected the new Africa Gate. The Flat Bastion Magazine within the Bastion was once a point where immense quantities of gunpowder were stored. It was threatened by a fire in 1874 that swept through the long grass and other vegetation of the south districts of the colony and reached Charles V's wall before burning out.

== History ==
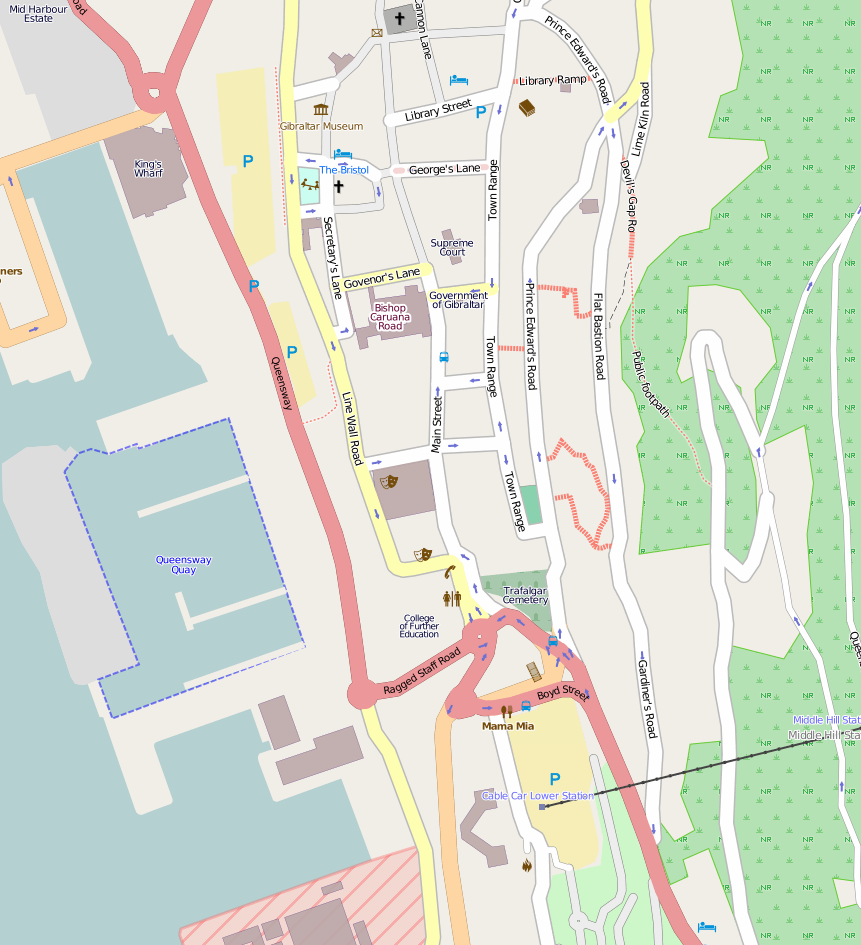
Roads of Gibraltar. Flat Bastion Road can be seen on the right. It becomes Gardiner's Road just south of the Flat Bastion, which is just east of Trafalgar Cemetery.

Conditions were unsanitary in the 19th century. The road is mentioned in 1828 when there was an outbreak of yellow fever in Gibraltar. A French medical commission visited the colony and documented their findings on the spread of the epidemic. Many of the reported cases were in houses on Flat Bastion Road. By September most of the houses on the road were infected. A sanitary sewer that ran parallel to the road was suspected. One source said it did not emit any excessive odours that seemed out of the normal. However, the French commission said that the sewer outside at least one of the houses in the road emitted a very bad smell ("une très mauvaise odeur"). A report of 1 September 1828 described Wilson's Buildings, two wooden sheds on the road to Flat Bastion, as "decidedly inimical to the health of any persons who may inhabit them."

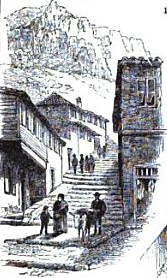
Flat Bastion Road in 1885, from Frank Leslie's Popular Monthly

Families living on the road in 1828 included those of Josepha Bernado, Jose Nuñez, the financier Grellet, the family of Thomas Gum, and the family of Michaela Medina. In 1832 the Gibraltar Public School, a free English-language establishment for poor children, was set up in a government-owned building on Flat Bastion Road. Funded by the contributions of wealthy people in the colony, it was open to children of all faiths. By 1833, there were 181 boys and 99 girls at the school. After boys were excluded in 1897, it continued as a school for girls into the early 20th century.

An 1883 Sanitary Order in Council aimed at reducing health risks defined Flat Bastion Road as one of the boundaries of the "streets, ramps, roads, lanes, passages, alleys, stairs and public places" within which the new regulations would apply. The Army Medical Department reported in 1889 that several cases of diphtheria had occurred in the married quarters on Flat Bastion Road. It turned out that the rainwater pipes from the roof were cracked. The pipes were connected directly to the sewer, and sewer gas was escaping into the rooms.

The road was depicted in an article on the colony that appeared in 1885 in Frank Leslie's Popular Monthly, a New York-based magazine, in a pastiche of ink drawings that also depict "Catland Bay" (Catalan Bay), Waterport Gate, the signal station and the rock from the Spanish lines. A donkey is depicted in the foreground. Jeanie Conan depicted the picturesque road in a watercolour titled "Flat Bastion Rd. Gibraltar" in 1888. A visitor noted that the "Ladysmith club" on the Flat Bastion Road was holding masquerades in its salons, while elsewhere the Salvation Army was preaching and parading signs with advice from the gospels.

== Modern times ==
During the 1970 census, residents on the road were counted as part of the Gowlands Ramp enumeration area.

The magazine is now a geological research facility and exhibition centre involved with the lithology of Gibraltar. The barracks, north of the bastion on Flat Bastion Road, have been renovated and converted into affordable residential housing. The Flat Bastion barracks redevelopment project started by 2007, and was completed about 2010. The development has been renamed Flat Bastion Mews. Communal gardens for the new housing were established at that time. The two bedroom apartments also included allocated parking.

The government's Traffic, Parking and Transport Plan issued in 2009, mentions a parking project for Flat Bastion Road under which 104 parking spots were to be added. In 2010 there was public criticism about the lack of parking on the road as the government had removed existing parking before constructing the new parking spaces.

== Gallery ==
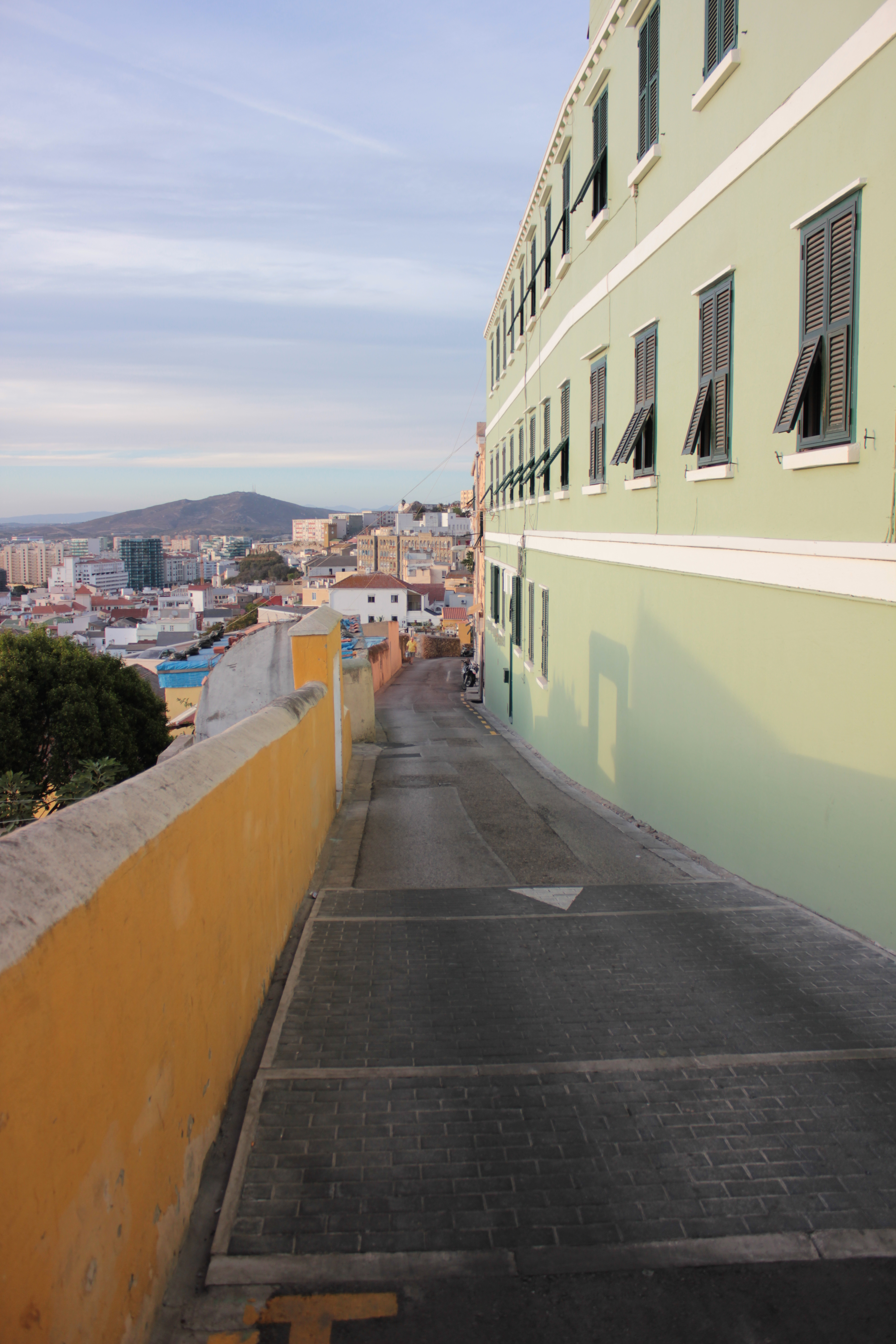
View of Flat Bastion Road looking north.

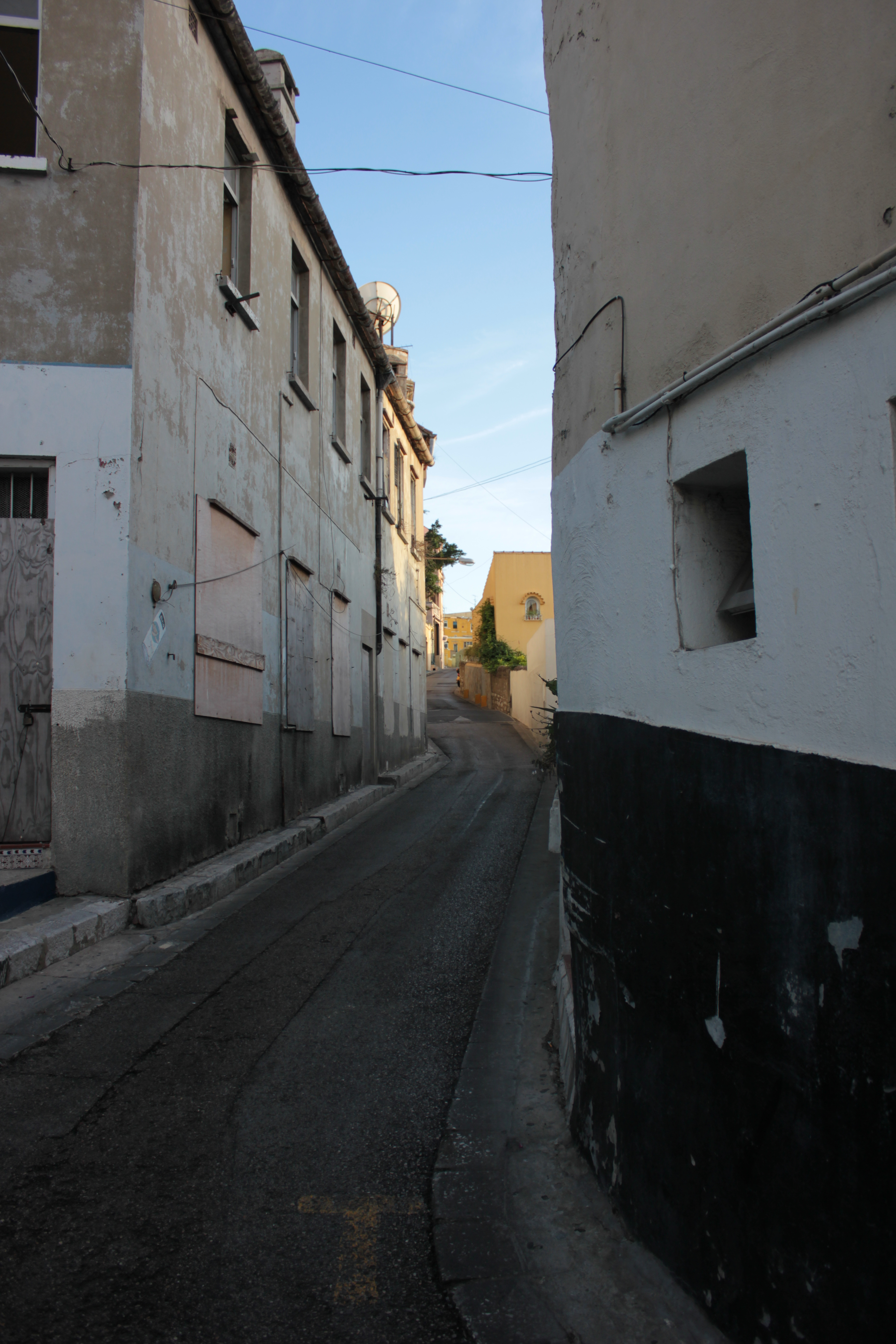
View of Flat Bastion Road looking south.

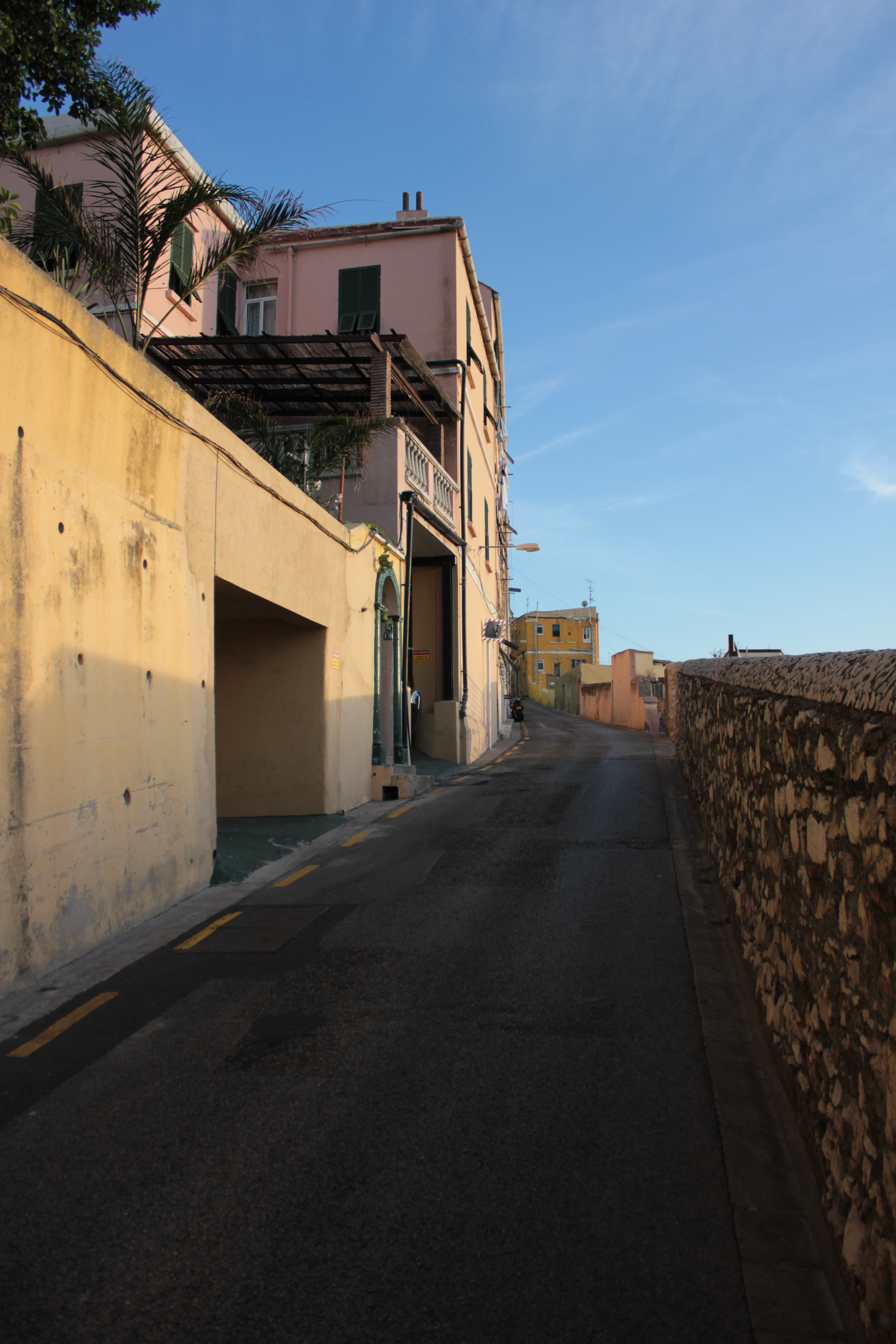
Flat Bastion Road

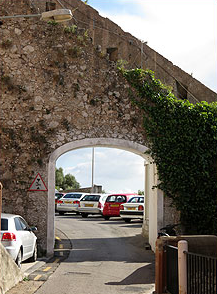
Gate cut through Charles V Wall to allow access to the Flat Bastion via Flat Bastion Road.
