= Prince Edward's Gate =

Gate in Gibraltar

- Part of Fortifications of Gibraltar
- Charles V Wall, Gibraltar
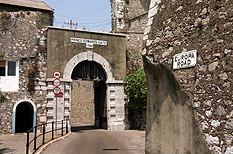
- View of Prince Edward's Gate in Charles V Wall from Europa Road, looking north.

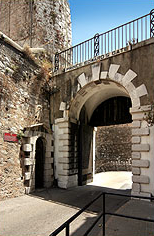
- View of Prince Edward's Gate in Charles V Wall looking south from Prince Edward's Road. Sentry box to the left.

Site information
- Type: City gate
- Owner: Government of Gibraltar
- Open to the public: Yes
- Condition: Good

Location
- Location of Prince Edward's Gate within Gibraltar.
- Location within Gibraltar
- Coordinates: 36.134984°N 5.351841°W

Site history
- Built: 1790

Prince Edward's Gate is a city gate at the entrance to Prince Edward's Road in the British Overseas Territory of Gibraltar. It cuts through Charles V Wall, one of the 16th century fortifications of Gibraltar at the former southern limit of the city. The gate is adjacent to the west wall of the Flat Bastion, another 16th-century fortification. The gate was named after Prince Edward, the future Duke of Kent, and was opened in 1790, the same year the prince arrived at Gibraltar as commander of the 7th Regiment of Foot (Royal Fusiliers). While the gate now has a limited role in the defence of Gibraltar, it continues to provide vehicular and pedestrian access through Charles V Wall. Prince Edward's Gate is listed with the Gibraltar Heritage Trust.

== History ==
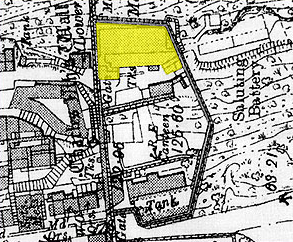
Section of 1908 Ordnance Survey map of Gibraltar with Flat Bastion. North to the left. Prince Edward's Gate at lower edge of map, tucked behind orillon of west wall of bastion, next to retired flank.

Prince Edward's Gate (pictured at right and below) is located on Prince Edward's Road in Gibraltar, the British Overseas Territory at the southern end of the Iberian Peninsula. The gate is in the Charles V Wall, one of the sixteenth-century fortifications of Gibraltar that formed the early southern defences of the city. Prince Edward's Gate, which was constructed in 1790, extends from the northwest corner of the Flat Bastion, another sixteenth-century fortification which projects southward from the Charles V Wall. The gate was positioned adjacent to the retired flank of the bastion, behind the orillon of its west wall (pictured in OS map at right), to aid in its defence. Prince Edward's Gate overlooked Trafalgar Cemetery to the southwest and the former St. Jago's Cemetery to the northwest.

There are two guardhouses next to the Prince Edward's Gate. A plaque (link below) adjacent to the sentry box on the north side of Prince Edward's Gate indicates that it was formerly the site of an inscription: "God and the soldier all men adore in time of trouble and no more, for when war is over and all things righted God is neglected and the old soldier slighted."

== Prince Edward ==
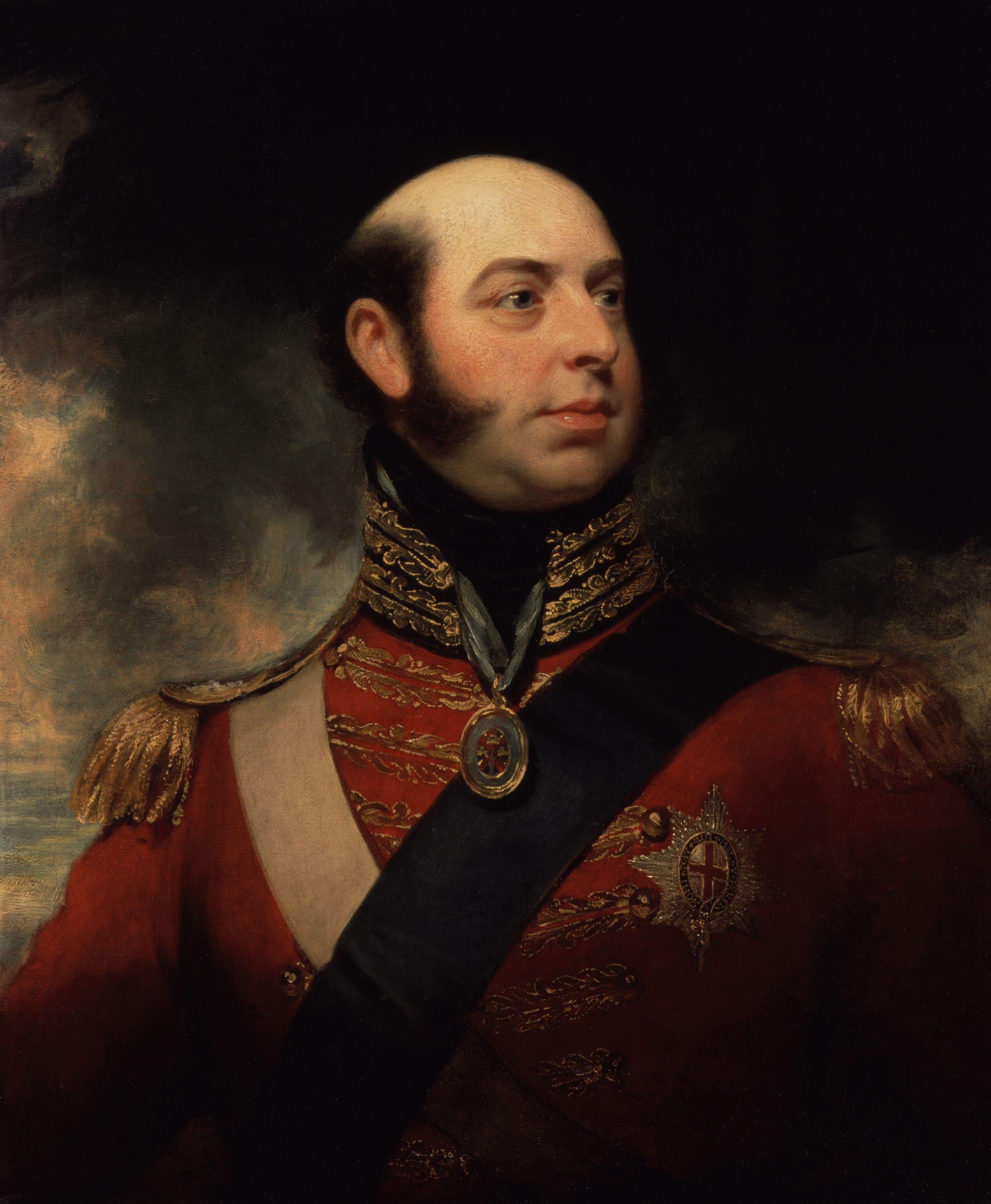
Prince Edward, Duke of Kent

The gate was named after Prince Edward (2 November 1767 – 23 January 1820), the fourth son of King George III, and later the Duke of Kent (1799) and the father of Queen Victoria (1819). At the time that the gate was opened, in 1790, the prince (pictured at right) was serving with the military in Gibraltar, as commander of the 7th Regiment of Foot (Royal Fusiliers). There, he developed a reputation as a strict disciplinarian; the prince and his regiment left Gibraltar for Québec the following year, in 1791. However, the Duke of Kent returned as Governor of Gibraltar in May 1802, following the death of Governor General Charles O'Hara who had died the previous February. General Barnett had served as acting governor in the interim. Prince Edward had orders from his brother Prince Frederick, the Duke of York, to restore a sense of military discipline at the garrison. The soldiers had become slovenly, and spent much of their time inebriated. Following his closure of taverns, a mutiny broke out on Christmas Eve 1802. The mutiny and his intended murder had been planned at the Three Guns Tavern, one of only three that the new governor had not closed. The mutiny was unsuccessful but, combined with his general reputation as a harsh disciplinarian, culminated in the duke's forced departure from Gibraltar in 1803. However, he refused to give up his position as governor, which he retained in name only. Subsequently, lieutenant governors served in Gibraltar until the duke's death in 1820.

== Legacy ==
Prince Edward's Gate was the subject of stamps issued by the Gibraltar Philatelic Bureau in 1971 and 1993. The issue in 1971 (link below) consisted of a pair of stamps, with two versions of the same view of the gate, one from an early nineteenth century print and the other from a twentieth-century photograph. The issue in 1993 (link below) featured an image of the north side of the gate. Prince Edward's Gate continues to provide access through the Charles V Wall. The gate and its two adjacent guardhouses have been listed with the Gibraltar Heritage Trust.
