= Gibraltar Public School =

School in Gibraltar

The Gibraltar Public School, also known as Committee of the Public School, was a government-owned school located on Flat Bastion Road in Gibraltar. The school was established in 1832 and closed in 1897.

== History ==
Gibraltar became a Crown colony in 1830 and although the official language was English the children were mostly taught in Spanish. In 1832 the then Governor of Gibraltar George Don arranged for a new school to open in Flat Bastion Road. This school opened the same year as Methodist Dr. William Harris Rule established another new school in Gibraltar. The diversity in the supply and quality of education arose from the political debates over the use of English and the choice of religion and denomination. 181 boys and 99 girls attended in 1833. In 1835 there were six private schools in Gibraltar. The school closed in 1897.

== See also ==
- Education in Gibraltar
