= Flat Bastion Magazine =

19th century heritage site in Gibraltar

- Part of Fortifications of Gibraltar
- Flat Bastion, Charles V Wall, Gibraltar
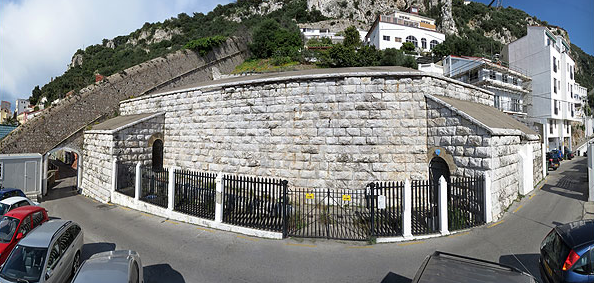
- Panoramic of the western façade of Flat Bastion Magazine with Flat Bastion Road in the foreground.

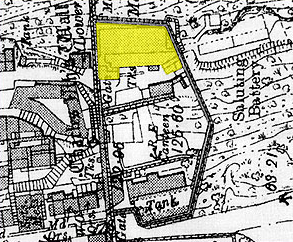
- Section of the 1908 Ordnance Survey map of Gibraltar showing the Flat Bastion, with the Flat Bastion Magazine highlighted in yellow. North is to the left.

Site information
- Type: Magazine
- Owner: Government of Gibraltar
- Open to the public: By appointment
- Condition: Restored, Converted to Geological Research Facility

Location
- Location of Flat Bastion Magazine within Gibraltar.
- Coordinates: 36.134907°N 5.351018°W

Site history
- Built: 1873

The Flat Bastion Magazine is a 19th-century magazine in the British Overseas Territory of Gibraltar. It is located within the Flat Bastion, a fortification that projects from the 16th century Charles V Wall at the former southern limit of the city. Flat Bastion Road extends through the bastion, just to the west of the magazine, south of which it becomes Gardiner's Road. Flat Bastion Magazine was constructed to store gunpowder, but eventually lay abandoned for years. While the Government of Gibraltar initially planned to develop it for parking, geology enthusiast Freddie Gomez and a colleague restored the building, which is now used as a geological research facility and exhibition centre. Both the Flat Bastion and the Flat Bastion Magazine are listed with the Gibraltar Heritage Trust. In addition, Gomez received the 2001 Heritage Award for the restoration of the building.

== Early history ==
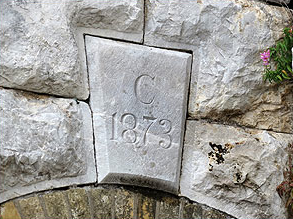
Keystone over a doorway at Flat Bastion Magazine shows it dates back to at least 1873.

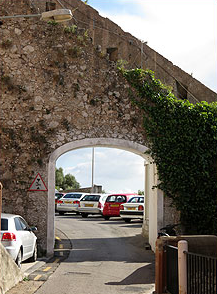
Gate cut through Charles V Wall to allow access to the Flat Bastion via Flat Bastion Road.

The Flat Bastion Magazine is a magazine in Gibraltar, the British Overseas Territory at the southern end of the Iberian Peninsula. It is within the eastern portion (highlighted in map below) of the Flat Bastion, one of the fortifications of Gibraltar that projects southward from the Charles V Wall and constituted part of the defences of the former southern limit of the city. Flat Bastion Road traverses the Flat Bastion, extending along the west side of the Flat Bastion Magazine. Access to the road at the north end of the bastion is provided by a gate (depicted in map below and in photograph at left) in the Charles V Wall, while at the south end of the bastion, a portion of its face has been removed (pictured in panoramic above). Immediately south of the bastion and its magazine, the road becomes Gardiner's Road.

The magazine was built on scree breccia, with an underlying bedrock of limestone. The ground on which the magazine was constructed was relatively flat due to "quaternary wave-cut platforms." While it is generally considered likely that a magazine was formerly present on the same site, the current, British magazine dates back to at least 1873, based on the date inscribed on a keystone over one of the doorways (pictured at left). The Flat Bastion Magazine was constructed primarily of locally quarried limestone blocks. It was built in wartime to store approximately 5,000 barrels of gunpowder. Many of the original wooden supports are still present. The primary storage area for gunpowder has been described as "a room within a room" as it is surrounded by a narrow hallway. Windows are present at the side walls of the principal room. Bricks were utilized in the construction of the walls, to absorb the impact of explosions. The doors were fabricated from oak that dates back five or six centuries, well before the British version of the magazine was built.

== Restoration ==
Gibraltarian Freddie Gomez, whose interests include history and geology, has looked after Flat Bastion Magazine for years, and believes that it dates back to before 1873. The building had been abandoned for an extended period of time before his decision to restore it. It is now a geological research facility and exhibition centre, Geological Research Station and Lithology of Gibraltar, and displays a large collection of rocks and minerals. While many of the displayed pieces come from his personal collection, a number have been donated. In 2001, the Gibraltar Heritage Trust presented Gomez with the 2001 Heritage Award in the senior individual category for "his enthusiasm and single-minded dedication to the restoration and preservation of Flat Bastion Magazine." Since 1993, the award has been presented annually by the Trust.

During a two-week training period in Gibraltar, the 150 (Yorkshire) Transport Regiment (Volunteers) from Doncaster and Kingston upon Hull spent a day at the Flat Bastion Magazine. The regiment assisted Gomez by performing a variety of repairs on the historic building. The fire step, roof, railings, pillars, wall, and letter box were refurbished. Gomez, who has been described as "entertainingly garrulous and delightfully eccentric," is primarily self-taught and knowledgeable on the topic of Gibraltar's geology. A native of Gibraltar, he initially completed his formal education at the age of fifteen when he was apprenticed out by his father. He spent time in Britain but returned to Gibraltar in 1986, after which he developed a passion for geology. He obtained a certificate in sedimentary geology from the University of Durham about 1997. Gomez established the Gibraltar Cave Exploration and Protection Group, although the organisation soon dissolved. However, it was through that organisation that Gomez developed a friendship with geologist Paul Hopkinson, who has also been instrumental in the restoration of the magazine. Flat Bastion Magazine had initially been slated to be redeveloped as a parking garage. The two men collaborated to save the historic Gibraltar structure.

Both the Flat Bastion Magazine and the structure within which it is contained, the Flat Bastion, are listed buildings with the Gibraltar Heritage Trust. Heritage Minister Steven Linares and several others toured Flat Bastion Magazine on 27 March 2012. Gomez related the details of the magazine's structure and history to his audience. While visits to the facility are currently by appointment only, it is anticipated that the Flat Bastion Magazine will be opened to the public.

== Gallery ==
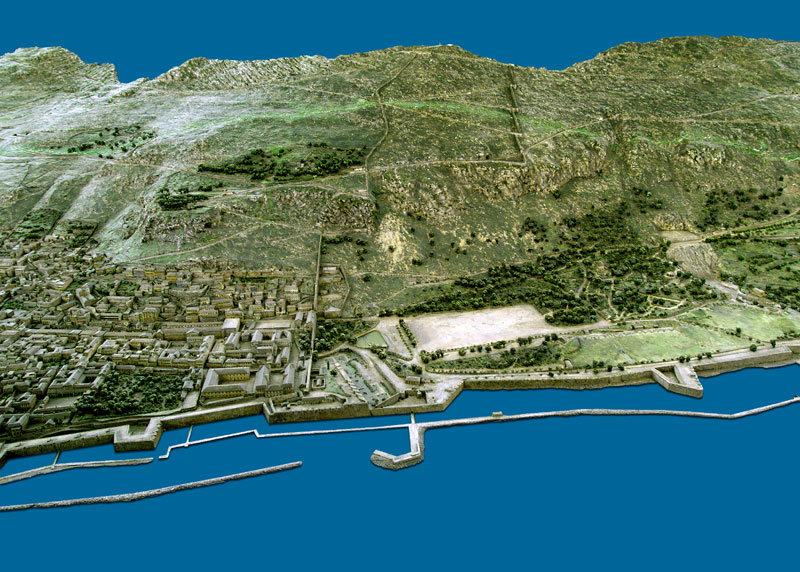
1865 scale model of Gibraltar showing Charles V Wall with Flat Bastion.

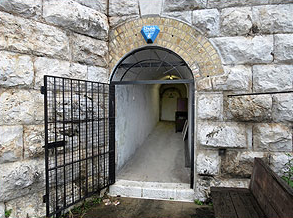
Southern entrance to Flat Bastion Magazine.

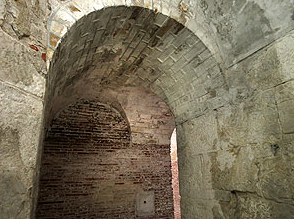
Bricks also used in construction of the magazine.

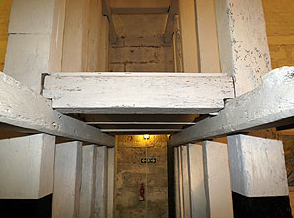
Wooden supports in interior of Flat Bastion Magazine.
