= Southport Gates =

City gates in Gibraltar

- Puerta de África
- Part of Fortifications of Gibraltar
- Charles V Wall, Gibraltar
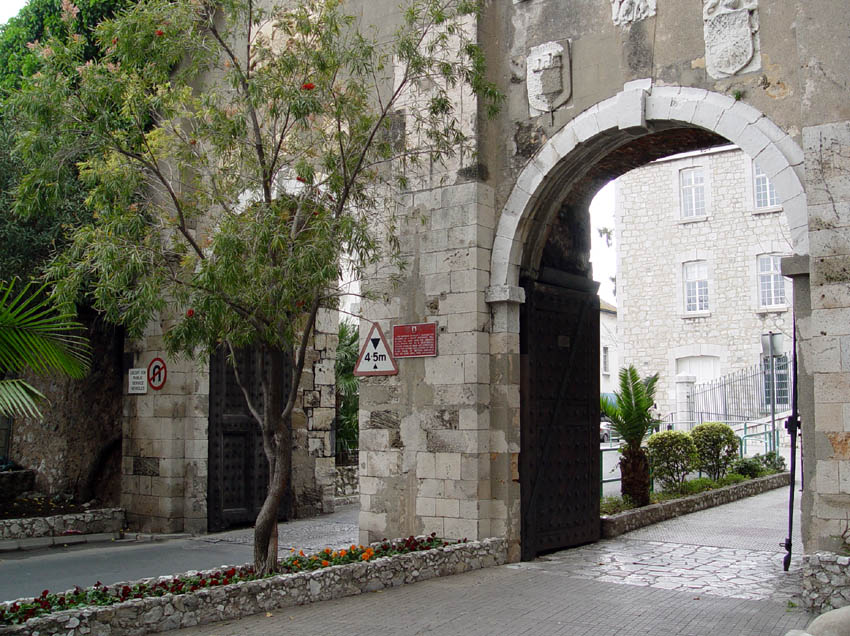
- View of New (l) and Old (r) Southport Gates in Charles V Wall, looking north.

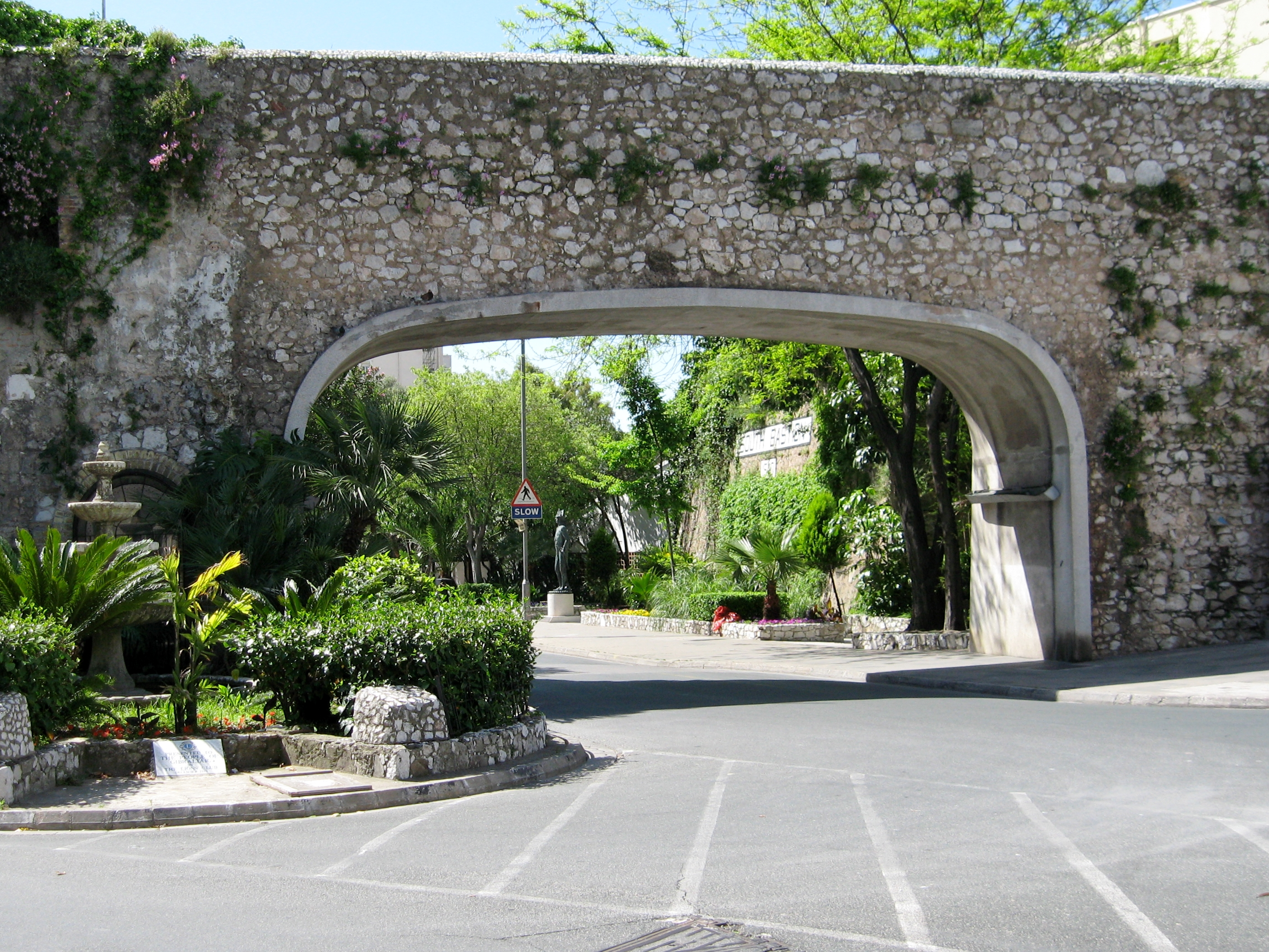
- View of Referendum Gate in Charles V Wall, looking south.

Site information
- Type: City Gates
- Owner: Government of Gibraltar
- Open to the public: Yes
- Condition: Good

Location
- Coordinates: 36.134890°N 5.352838°W

Site history
- Built: 1552, 1883, 1967

The Southport Gates are three city gates in the British Overseas Territory of Gibraltar. They are located in the Charles V Wall, one of the 16th century fortifications of Gibraltar. The gates are clustered together, with the South Bastion to the west, and the Trafalgar Cemetery to the east. The first and second Southport Gates were constructed at present day Trafalgar Road in 1552 and 1883, respectively. The third gate, Referendum Gate, is the widest of the three and was constructed in 1967 at Main Street, immediately west of the first two gates. The Southport Gates are listed with the Gibraltar Heritage Trust.

== Description ==
The Southport Gates are Gibraltar, the British Overseas Territory at the southern end of the Iberian Peninsula. The gates are located in the Charles V Wall, one of the early fortifications of Gibraltar that defended the former southern limit of the city. They are positioned between the South Bastion to the west and the Flat Bastion to the east, at the bottom of Trafalgar Hill, adjacent to the Trafalgar Cemetery (pictured below). The original Southport Gate and the "New" Southport Gate are located at Trafalgar Road, while the most recent of the gates, Referendum Gate, provides access at Main Street. The Southport Gates, together with a rifled muzzle loading ten inch 18 ton gun, are listed with the Gibraltar Heritage Trust.

== Southport Gate ==
The Southport Gate (pictured at right), formerly known as the Africa Gate, was the earliest of the trio of gates in the Charles V Wall. It was constructed by Italian engineer Giovanni Battista Calvi in 1552, under the reign of Charles V, Holy Roman Emperor. The Southport Gate bears the Royal Arms of Charles V, Holy Roman Emperor, as well as the coat of arms of Gibraltar. The gate was depicted in a 1627 map of Gibraltar by Spanish engineer Luis Bravo de Acuña. On the map now held by the British Museum, the Southport Gate and the adjacent Southport Ditch were labeled in Spanish as Puerta de África (English: Africa Gate) and Fosso (English: Ditch), respectively. The Flat Bastion (Spanish: Baluarte de Santiago), the South Bastion (Spanish: Baluarte de Nuestra Señora del Rosario), and Southport Ditch were elements in the defence of the gate and the city. The Southport Ditch was a large trench which extended along the south side of Charles V Wall from the southwestern end of the South Bastion to the Flat Bastion at Prince Edward's Gate.

== New Southport Gate ==
The centre gate was constructed in 1883. The New Southport Gate (pictured above) was opened in the Charles V Wall to improve the flow of traffic. It was constructed during the reign of Queen Victoria and the term of Governor of Gibraltar General Sir John Miller Adye. It is ornamented with the coat of arms of the governor and that of Gibraltar, over which is the Royal Arms of Queen Victoria. In the 19th century, the Southport Ditch was the site of an ordnance depot. In the 1880s, the South Bastion featured four new rifled muzzle loading guns. A magazine was built in Southport Ditch at that time to store the ammunition needed for the new guns. Today, one of the guns (pictured below) is mounted just inside the Southport Gates. By 1908, the magazine had been converted to use as a pumphouse, as demonstrated on an Ordnance Survey map of that year.

== Referendum Gate ==
The third gate, named Referendum Gate (pictured below and at right), is the widest of the three gates. Also referred to as the Referendum Arch, it was built in 1967, to the west of the first two gates. The gate commemorates Gibraltar's first sovereignty referendum of 1967, in which Gibraltarians voted by an overwhelming majority to remain British rather than become Spanish. The western portion of the Southport Ditch had been utilised in the 19th century as a market garden and was known as the Sunken Gardens. At the time that the Referendum Gate was opened, that part of the ditch was filled. Trafalgar Cemetery represents a remnant of the eastern portion of the Southport Ditch, and was formerly referred to as Southport Ditch Cemetery.

Gibraltar National Day, an annual holiday held every 10 September in Gibraltar, also commemorates the referendum of 10 September 1967 in which more than 99% of the votes cast rejected annexation by Spain, favouring the British status quo. The holiday was first celebrated in 1992, the 25th anniversary of the first sovereignty referendum.

== Gallery ==
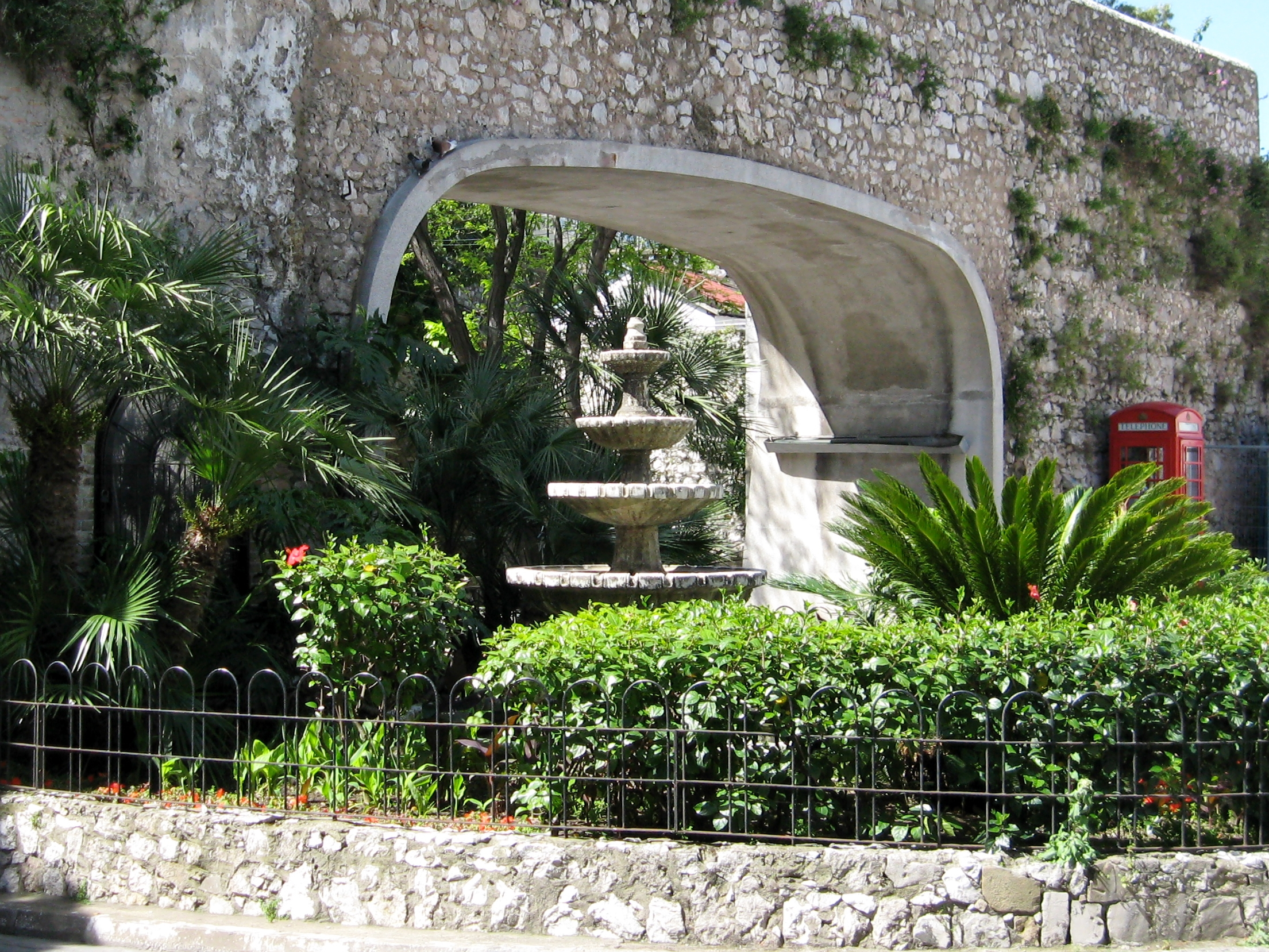
Referendum Gate

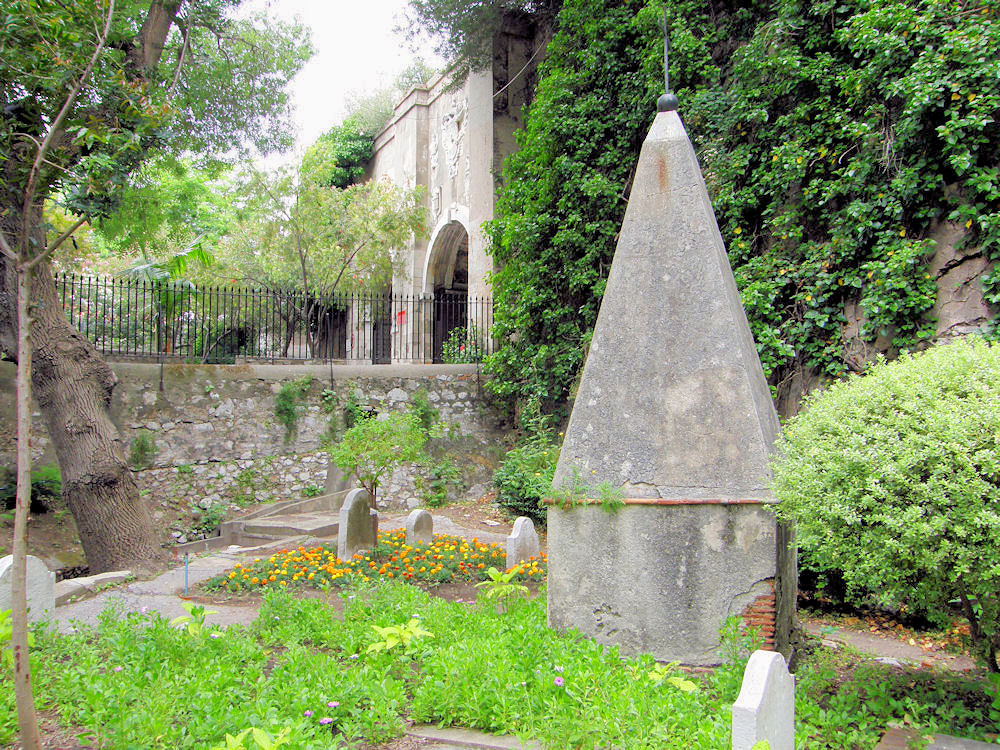
Trafalgar Cemetery, east of Southport Gates

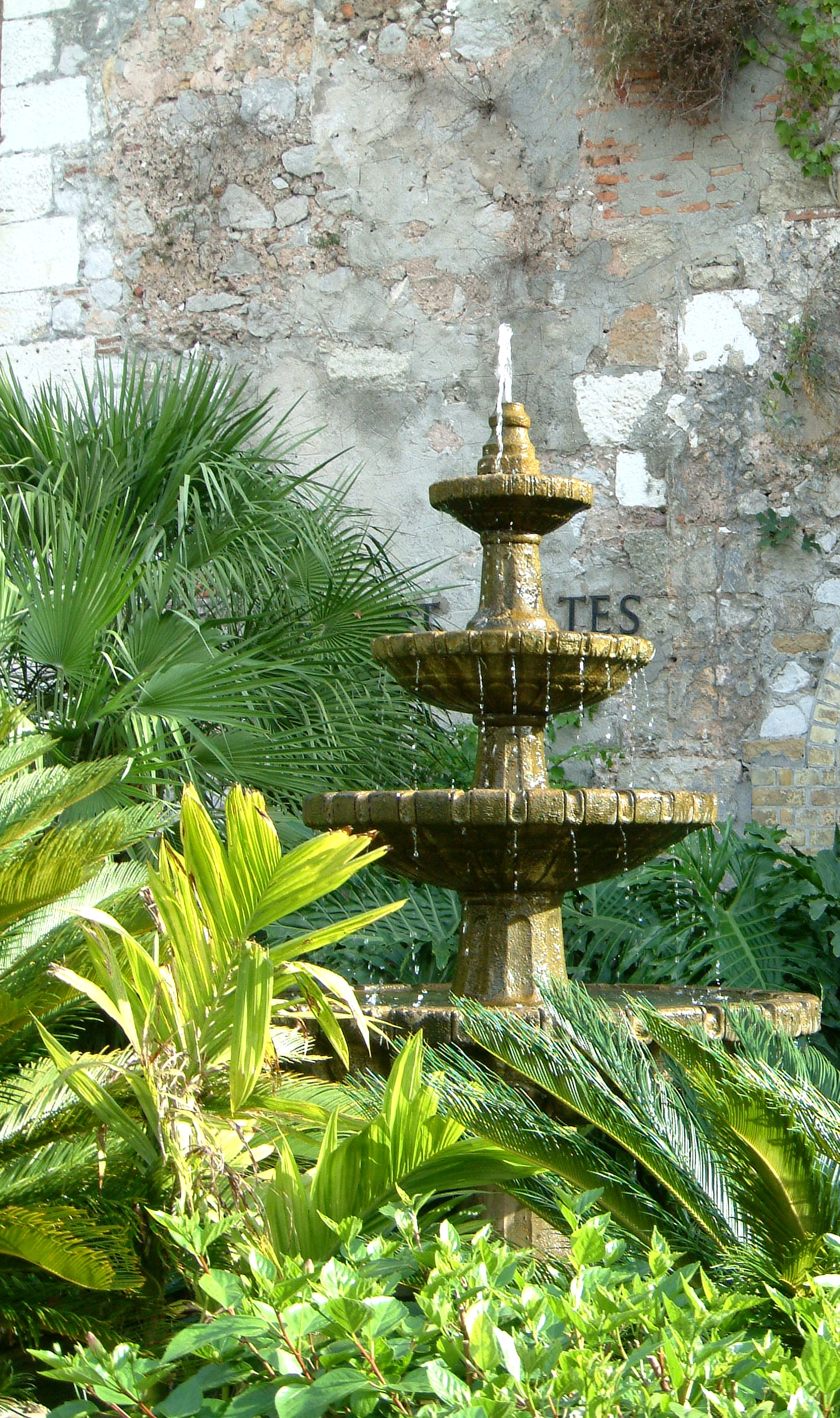
Fountain at Southport Gates

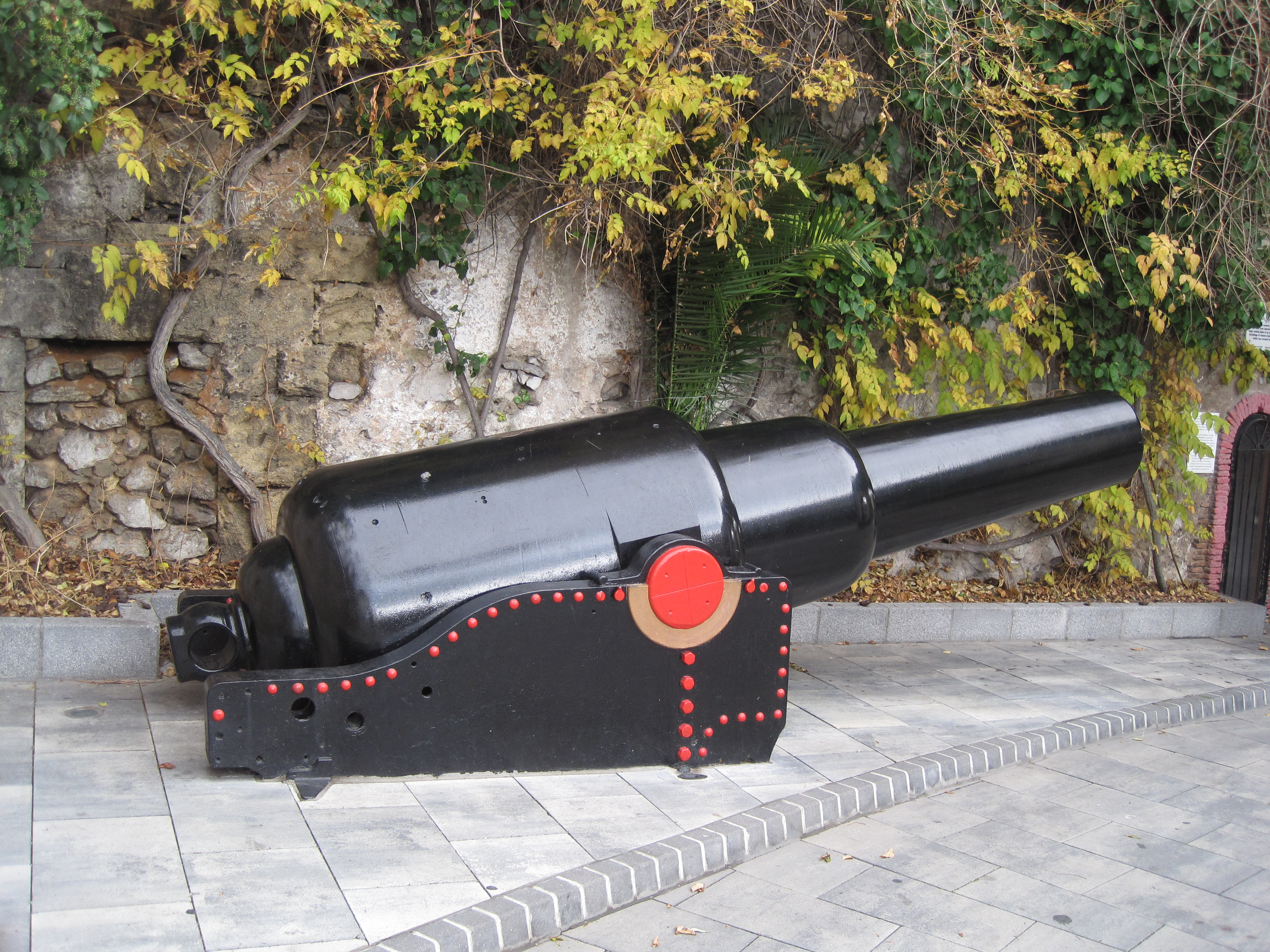
RML 10 inch 18 ton gun, Southport Gates

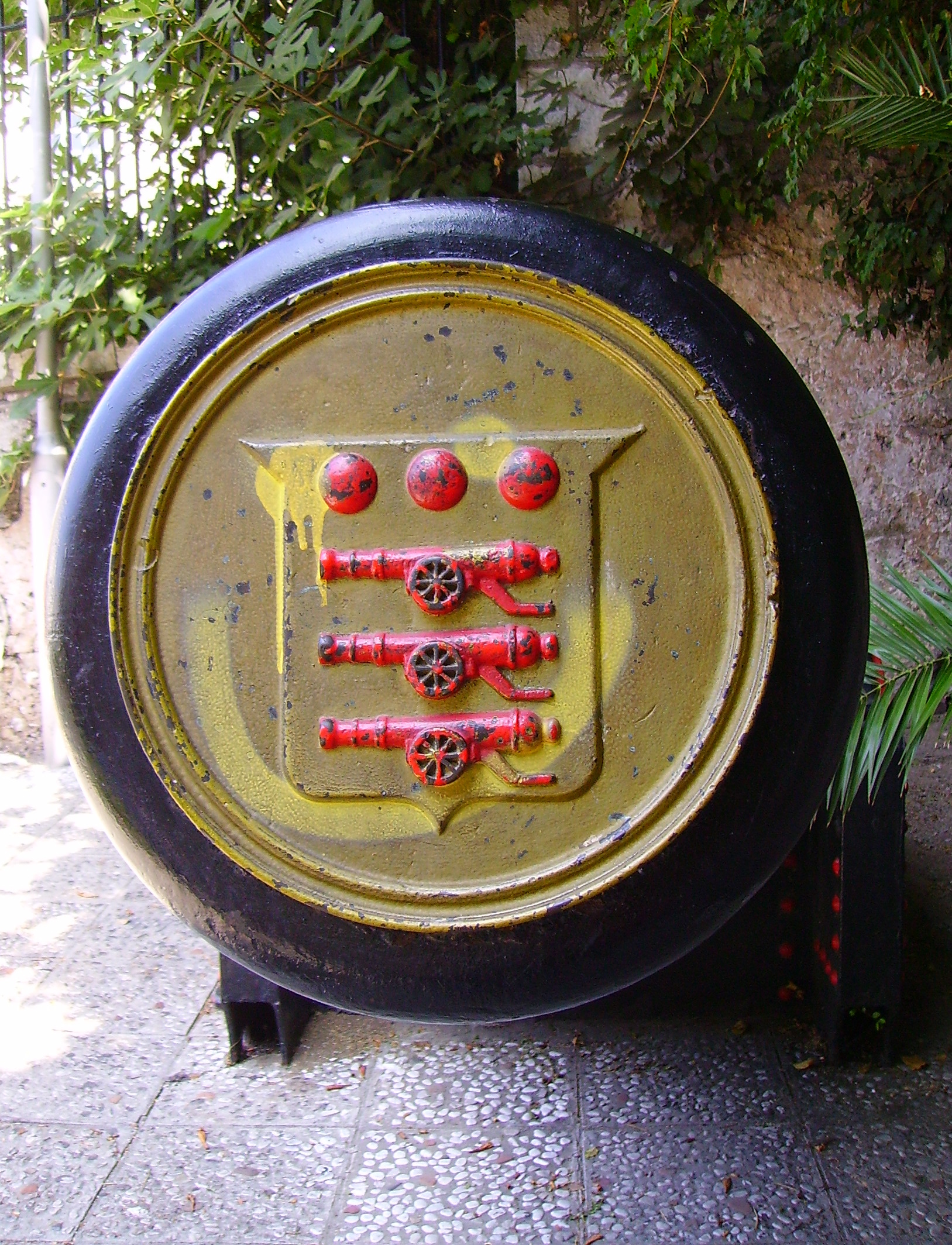
Tampion in RML 10 inch 18 ton gun
