= Trafalgar Cemetery =

Cemetery in Gibraltar

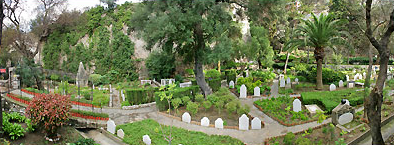
- Panoramic view of the Trafalgar Cemetery
- Interactive map of Trafalgar Cemetery

Details
- Established: 1798
- Location: Southport Ditch, Trafalgar Road
- Country: Gibraltar
- Coordinates: 36.134747°N 5.352273°W
- Owned by: Government of Gibraltar

The Trafalgar Cemetery is a cemetery in the British Overseas Territory of Gibraltar. Formerly known as the Southport Ditch Cemetery, it occupies a small area of land just to the south of the city walls, in what had been a defensive ditch during the period of Spanish rule of Gibraltar. Although it is named for the Battle of Trafalgar of 21 October 1805, only two victims of the battle are buried there. The remainder of the interments are mostly of those killed in other sea battles or casualties of the yellow fever epidemics that swept Gibraltar between 1804 and 1814. In addition, tombstones were transferred to the Trafalgar Cemetery from St. Jago's Cemetery and Alameda Gardens.

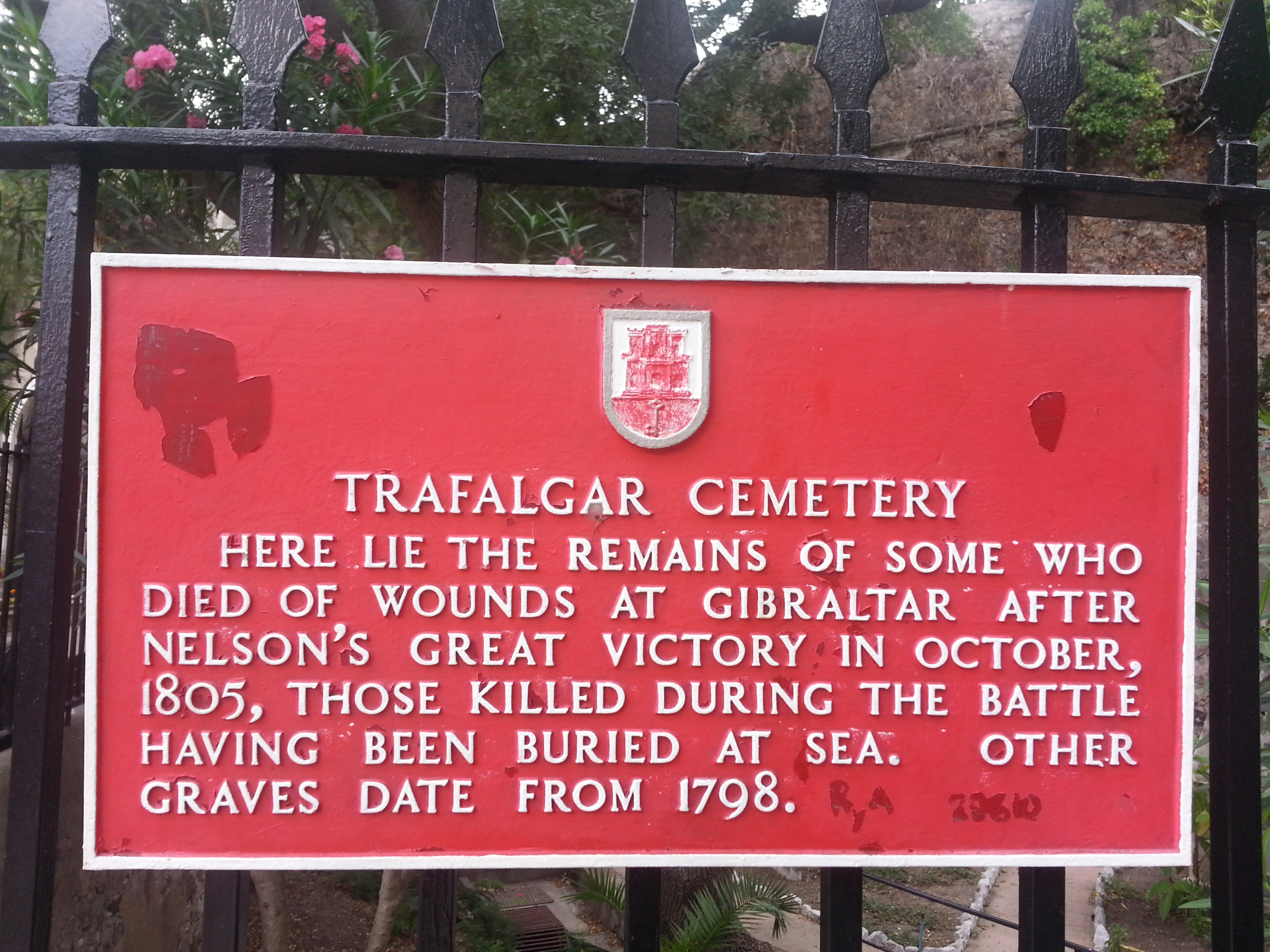
Trafalgar Cemetery

The cemetery is no longer used for burials and was abandoned for many years, but was restored in the 1980s. In 1992, a memorial to the Battle of Trafalgar was erected in the cemetery. The graveyard is the site of an annual commemorative ceremony on Trafalgar Day, the Sunday nearest to the anniversary of the Battle of Trafalgar. Trafalgar Cemetery is listed with the Gibraltar Heritage Trust.

== Location ==
The Trafalgar Cemetery is in Gibraltar, the British Overseas Territory at the southern end of the Iberian Peninsula. It is a triangular parcel of land whose boundaries are formed by the Charles V Wall to the north, Prince Edward's Road to the east, and Trafalgar Road to the southwest. Prince Edward's Gate is at the northeast corner of the cemetery; the Southport Gates are at the northwest corner.

The cemetery is just outside the old city walls, in a section of the Southport Ditch, part of the southern defences of the city. The Southport Ditch was a large trench which extended on the south side of Charles V Wall from the South Bastion to the Flat Bastion. It was depicted in a 1627 map of Gibraltar by Spanish engineer Luis Bravo de Acuña. On the map held by the British Museum, it is labeled in Spanish as Fosso (English: Ditch).

== Early history ==
The cemetery was formerly known as the Southport Ditch Cemetery. It was consecrated in June 1798, seven years prior to the Battle of Trafalgar, which took place on 21 October 1805. The cemetery was sometimes considered to be part of St. Jago's Cemetery, the larger burial ground just to the north, on the opposite side of Charles V Wall. St. Jago's, also known as Deadman's Cemetery, was the only cemetery within the walls of the city of Gibraltar. In addition, it may have represented Gibraltar's oldest known cemetery. It was incorporated into St. Jago's Barracks playground in 1929, and repurposed as a rifle range and "ball alley." There exists little evidence of the former cemetery.

== Interments ==
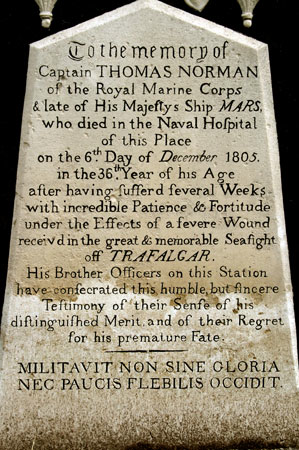
Headstone of Captain Thomas Norman of HMS Mars

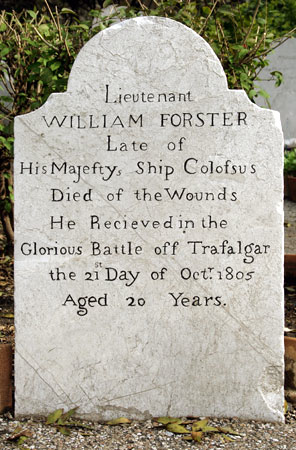
Headstone of Lieutenant William Forster of HMS Colossus

The Southport Ditch Cemetery was used for interments between 1798 and 1814, after which it fell into disuse. The only exception was the grave from 1838 at the northeast corner of the cemetery, near Prince Edward's Gate. The renaming of the graveyard to commemorate the Battle of Trafalgar apparently did not occur until many years after the victory. Only two of the interments are of those who died of wounds sustained during the battle. One of the victims was Captain Thomas Norman of the Royal Marine Corps and HMS Mars, who died in the Naval Hospital on 6 December 1805 at the age of 36. The other was Lieutenant William Forster of HMS Colossus, who died of the wounds that he received in battle on 21 October 1805 at the age of 20. A plaque mounted by the Southport Gates reads: "Trafalgar Cemetery - Here Lie The Remains of Some Who Died of Wounds at Gibraltar After Nelson's Great Victory in October, 1805, Those Killed During The Battle Having Been Buried at Sea. Other Graves Date From 1798."

Most of those who were killed during the battle were buried at sea. HMS Victory, Horatio Nelson's former flagship, was towed into Rosia Bay on 28 October 1805. Later, Nelson's remains were transported to England, where he was buried in a crypt in St Paul's Cathedral. Casualties of the battle were brought to Gibraltar; those who died later of their injuries were interred in St. Jago's Cemetery, north of Charles V Wall. Many of the graves in Trafalgar Cemetery represent the victims of three yellow fever epidemics. Those epidemics in Gibraltar had been most severe during the years 1804, 1813, and 1814. Also interred at Trafalgar Cemetery were the sailors who died in other battles of the French Revolutionary and Napoleonic Wars, including the First Battle of Algeciras in 1801 and conflicts off Cádiz and Málaga in 1810 and 1812, respectively.

== Transfer of headstones ==
In 1932, more than a century after the Trafalgar Cemetery fell into disuse, gravestones from St. Jago's Cemetery were mounted on the east wall of Trafalgar Cemetery. The oldest tombstone on the wall dates to 1738. The transfer of headstones was undertaken on the order of General Sir Alexander Godley, the Governor of Gibraltar. In addition, over the years, several tombstones were transferred from the Alameda Gardens; some of the free-standing gravestones date back to the 1780s.

== Recent history ==
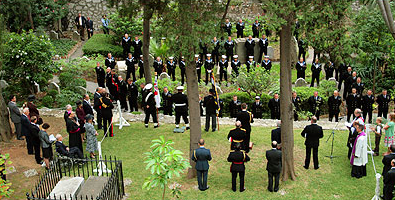
Trafalgar Day ceremony at Trafalgar Cemetery in 2008

For years, an annual ceremony has been held on Trafalgar Day, the Sunday closest to 21 October. On that day, the ceremony in the cemetery commemorates those who died in the Battle of Trafalgar. A general restoration of the Trafalgar Cemetery was undertaken in the 1980s. In 1990, responsibility for the maintenance of the cemetery was transferred to the Gibraltar Heritage Trust, which completed repairs of the gates and walls. Gibraltar celebrated its tercentenary anniversary of British rule in 2004. That year, some veterans who had served there were invited to Gibraltar. The July 2004 schedule for the veterans included events at the Trafalgar Cemetery, Gibraltar Cross of Sacrifice, Gibraltar Museum, and St. Michael's Cave.

In 1992, a monument was unveiled at the cemetery by the Governor of Gibraltar, Admiral Sir Derek Reffell. The memorial included an anchor donated by the Royal Navy, as well as an inscription. The quote was that of Admiral Cuthbert Collingwood, who reported both the victory at Trafalgar and the demise of Vice Admiral Horatio Nelson. Outside of the cemetery stands a life-size, bronze statue of Lord Nelson by British sculptor John Doubleday. It was erected in 2005 to commemorate the 200th anniversary of the Battle of Trafalgar. In addition, a small plaque was mounted at the former area of St. Jago's Cemetery to commemorate the site of interment of those sailors who later died of wounds inflicted during the battle. Trafalgar Cemetery is listed with the Gibraltar Heritage Trust.

== Gallery ==
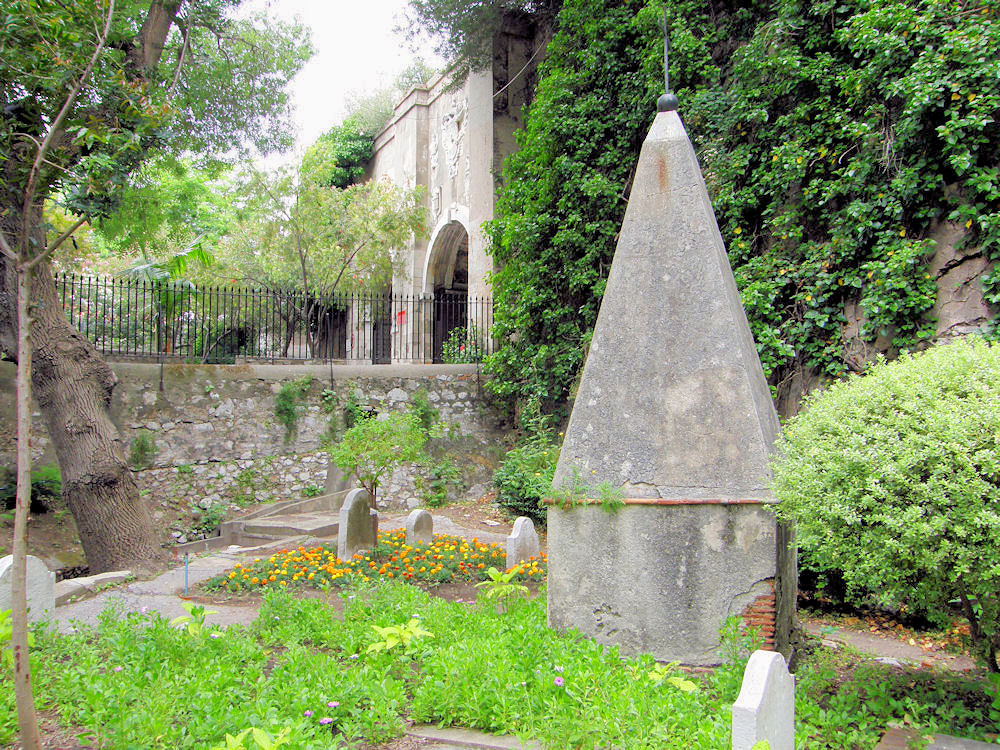
Northwest corner of Trafalgar Cemetery, adjacent to the Southport Gates

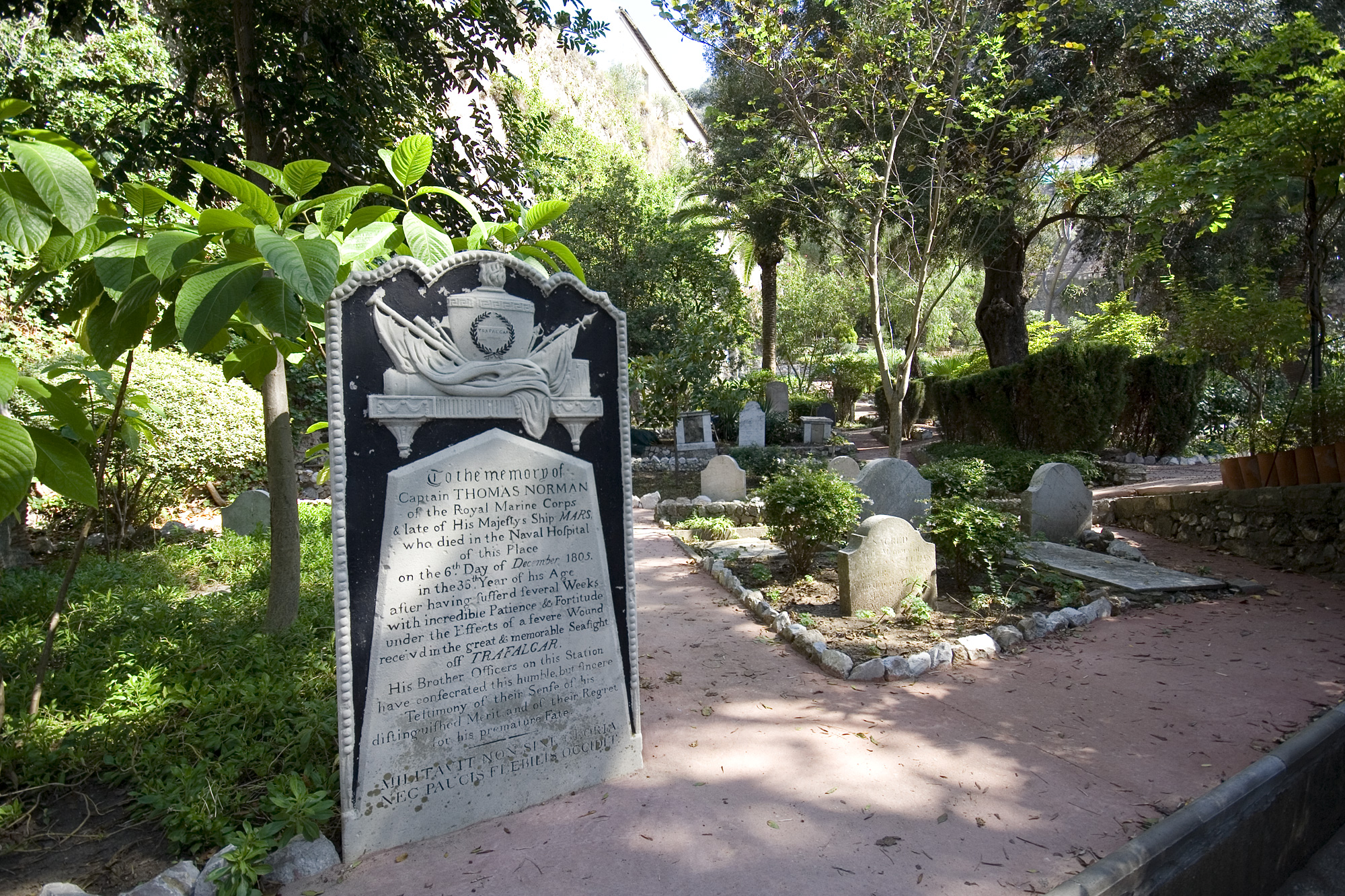
Gravestone of Captain Thomas Norman of the Royal Marine Corps and HMS Mars (1794)

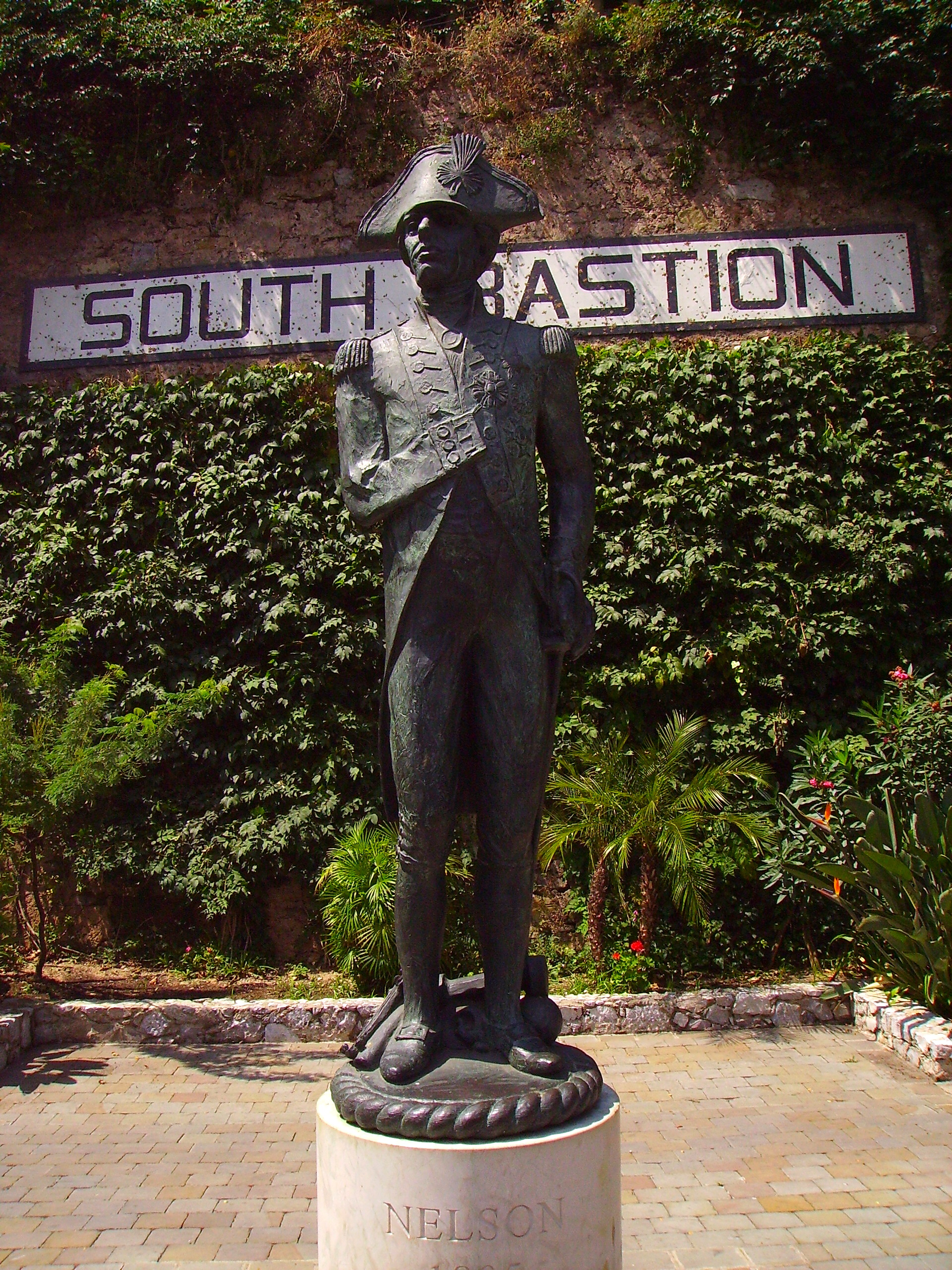
Statue of Lord Horatio Nelson unveiled by Peter Caruana in front of the South Bastion in 2005

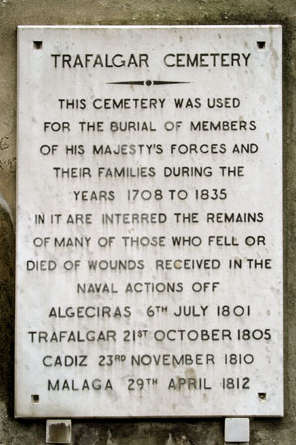
Plaque at Trafalgar Cemetery which gives dates of naval actions for the deceased

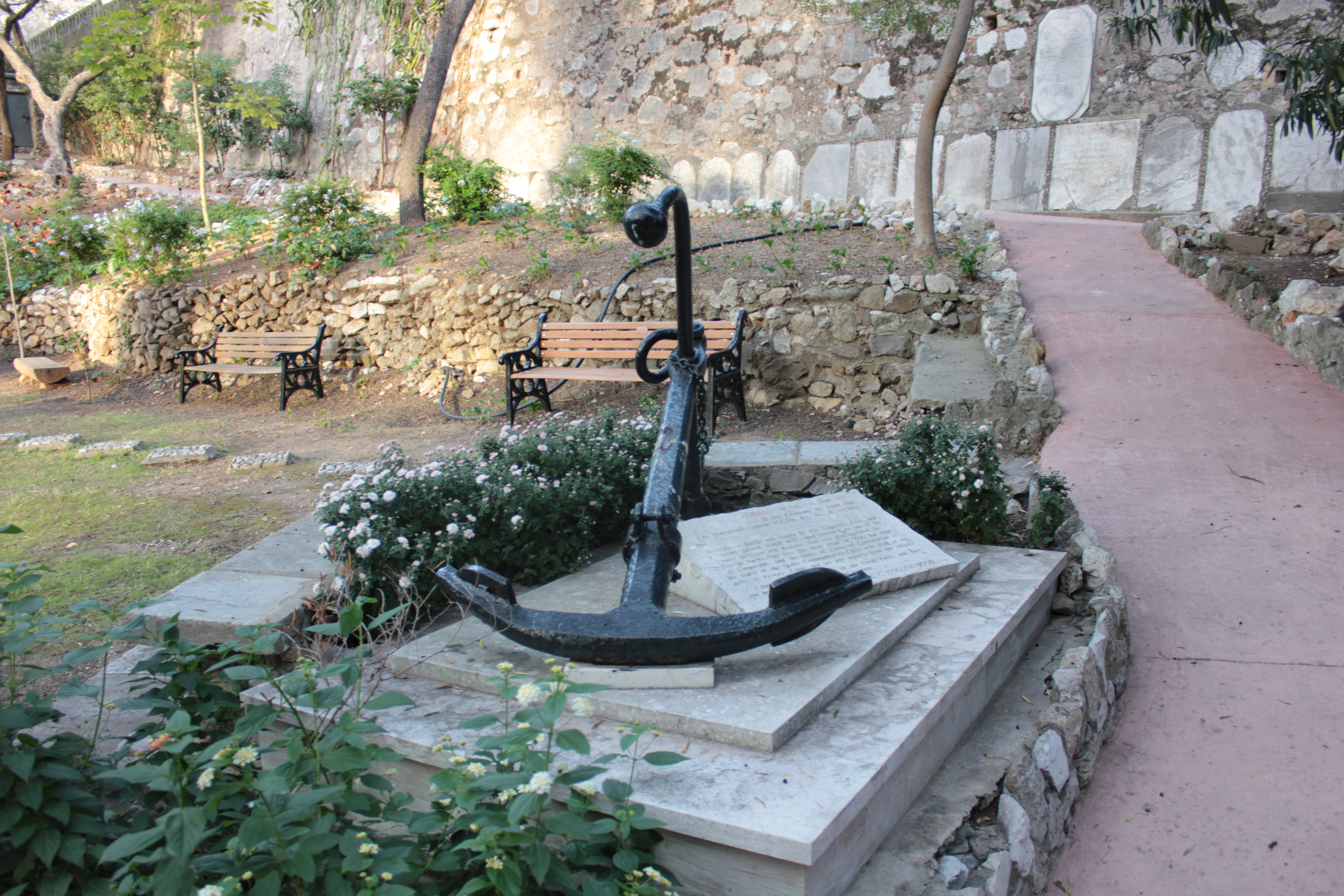
Battle of Trafalgar Monument in Trafalgar Cemetery, erected in 1992, anchor and inscription

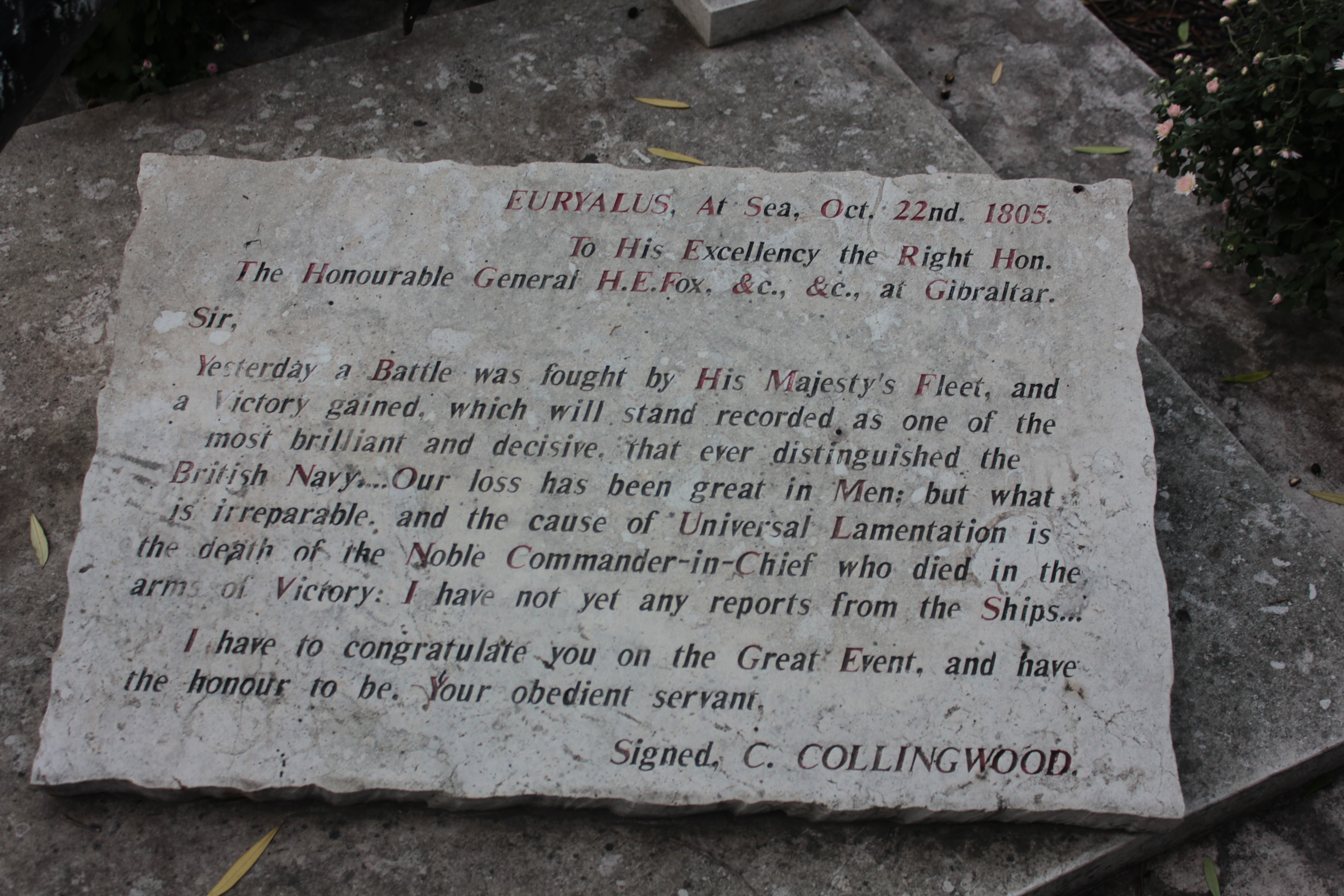
Collingwood inscription adjacent to anchor on the Battle of Trafalgar Monument
