= South Bastion, Gibraltar =

Bastion in Gibraltar

South Bastion
- Part of Fortifications of Gibraltar
- Gibraltar
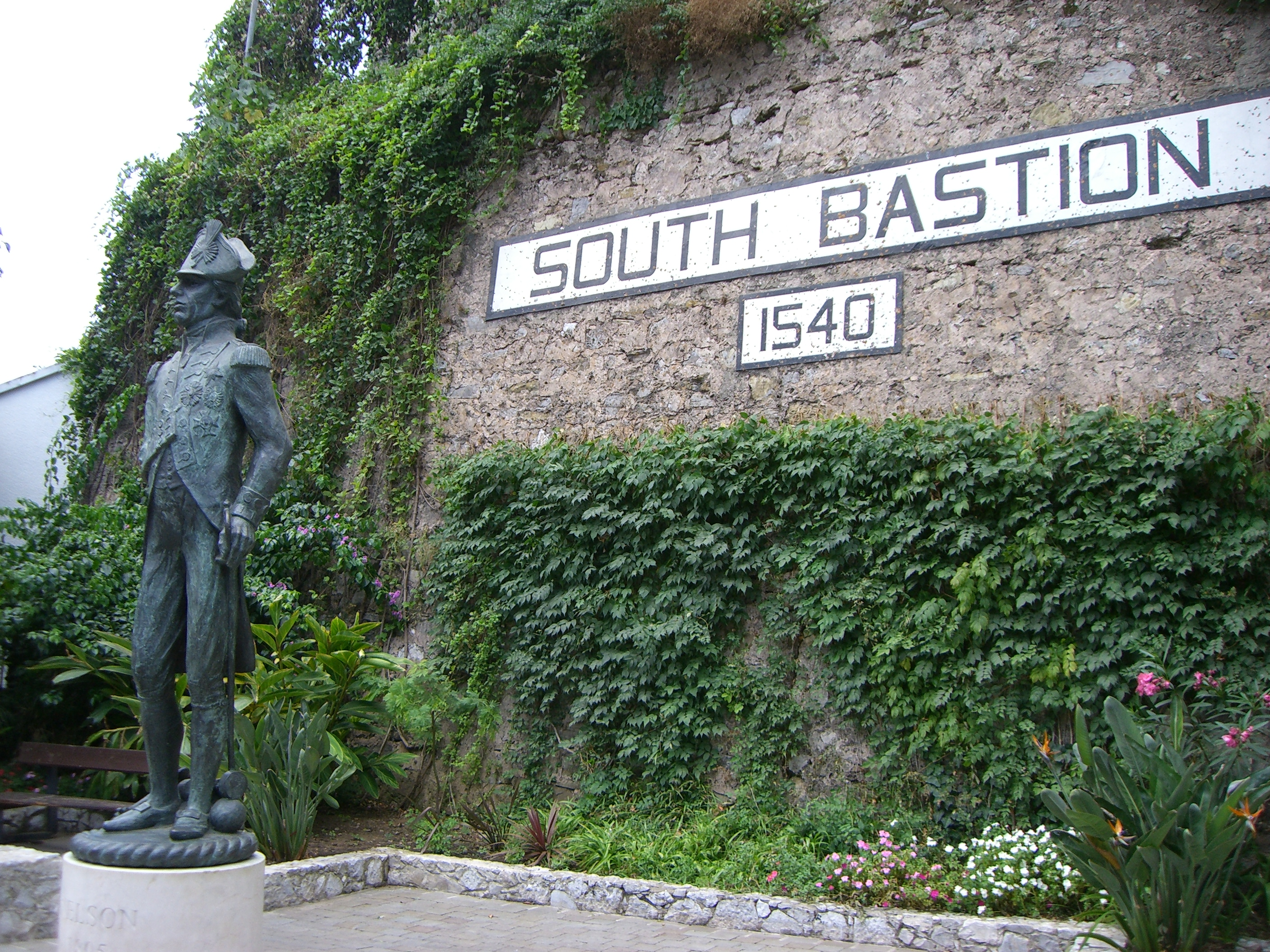
- Lord Nelson Memorial in front of South Bastion's eastern façade in Gibraltar.

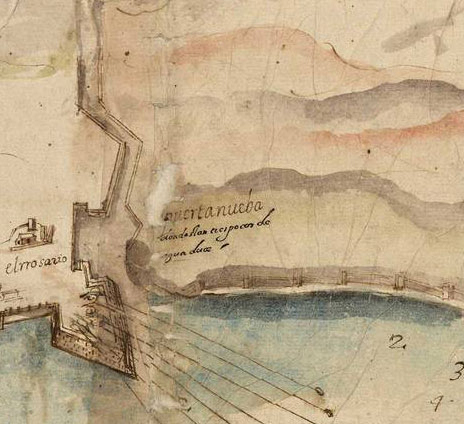
- Lower section of Charles V Wall showing lines of fire from the South Bastion. The right side of the diagram is the south side. The Flat Bastion is above the South Bastion in this diagram.

Site information
- Owner: Government of Gibraltar
- Open to the public: Yes

Location
- Coordinates: 36.134261°N 5.353781°W

Site history
- Built: 1540
- Built by: Philip II of Spain

The South Bastion was part of the fortifications of Gibraltar, protecting the western base of the Charles V Wall. It was originally built by Spanish military engineers, later improved by the British. The South Bastion stands at the south end of the Line Wall Curtain which defends the town from attack from the Bay of Gibraltar. Another curtain wall runs east from the bastion to the base of a precipice. This wall is pierced by the Southport Gates, guarded by the South Bastion and the Flat Bastion on either side.

== Early structures ==
The Milanese military engineer Giovanni Battista Calvi visited Gibraltar in 1557 and drew plans for two defensive positions to the south of the town, where the South Bastion and Flat Bastion now stand, connected by a new curtain wall. Calvi was ill, and did not stay to carry out the planned works. It may have been another Italian, Amodeo Agostino, who died in 1571 who built the original bastions. Another source says the bastion that was incorporated into the South Bastion was probably designed for Philip II of Spain by the Italian engineer Giacomo Fratino in the 1560s.

== Fortification ==
The South Bastion, called the Baluarte de Nuestra Señora del Rosario ("Bastion of Our Lady of the Rosary") by the Spanish, had been built by 1627. (Note: Some writers speculate that the bastion may have been designed by the German engineer Daniel Specklin of Strasbourg. The design of the earlier fortifications could not have been his work, since he would have been too young. There is no evidence that he visited Spain, and he is not included in Aparaci's list of military engineers who worked in Spain in the sixteenth century.) Casemented gun positions on the bastion enfiladed the ditch across the Gate of Africa, now the Southport Gate. The South bastion, and the Flat Bastion further inland, protected the Southport Gate, which lay between them. A writer in 1786 described the southern defenses of Gibraltar:

From the South bastion (which is considerably higher than the rest of the works, in order to protect the town from the eminences on the red sands) a curtain [wall] extends up the face of the hill, and concludes, at an inaccessible precipice, the works of the town. In this curtain is the South port gate, before which, and the south bastion, is a dry ditch, with a covered way and glacis. At the east end, on the declivity of the hill, above the gate, is a large flat bastion, connected with the curtain, and mounting 13 guns, bearing on the bay, &c. This work is covered by a demi-bastion that joins the precipice.

Above the precipice the Moorish Wall and the upper Charles V Wall both continue up to the crest of the rock. A traveler described the bastion in 1771 as follows:

The south bastion has irregular faces, that next the sea being three hundred feet in length, and that next the red sands two hundred and sixty : this bastion is raised higher than the line wall, to cover the town from the sand hills immediately before it; and within musket shot, on the south face are four embrasures, the flank has a breast work, and a retired flank with two embrasures to scour the ditch.

The same writer said of the insect life: "The centipedes and quadrantipedes are plenty, with a large hairy spider, which some say is the tarantula, and together with the grilia talpa, are inhabitants of the south bastion."

== Today ==
One of the bastion's current uses is to house the Gibraltar College which sits on top of the bastion. A statue of Horatio Nelson stands below the South Bastion's wall, erected to commemorate the 200th anniversary of his victory and death in the Battle of Trafalgar (21 October 1805). The statue was designed by John Doubleday and shows Nelson as he was when he last arrived at Gibraltar. The sculpture was commissioned by the Government of Gibraltar and is cast in part from copper taken from HMS Victory which visited the harbour on a number of occasions.
