= Sentry box =

Booth erected to provide shelter to a sentry

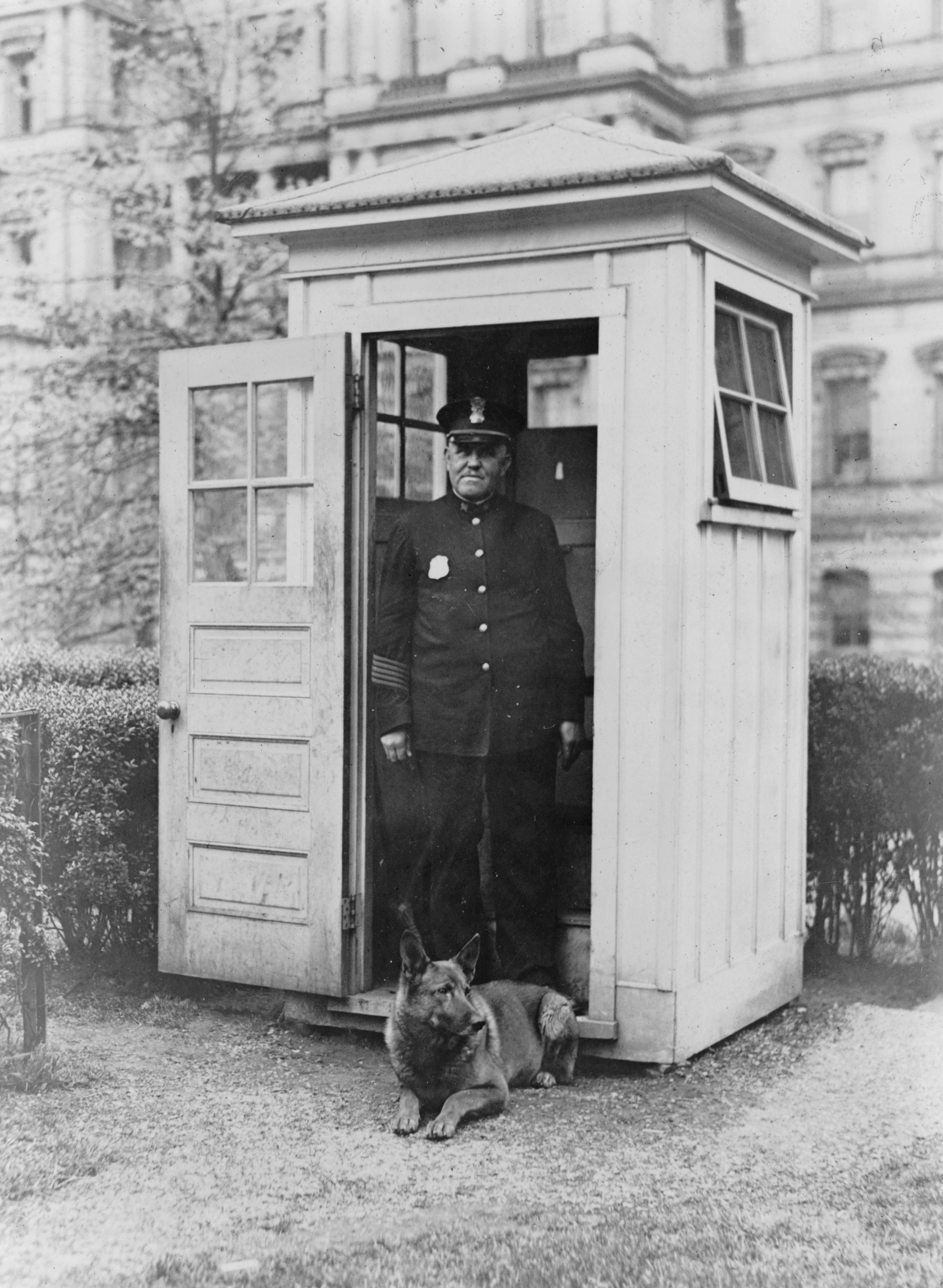
A sentry box in Washington, DC in 1929

A sentry box is a small shelter with an open front in which a sentry or person on guard duty may stand to be sheltered from the weather. Many boxes are decorated in national colours.

== In literature ==
The sentry box at the entrance to Buckingham Palace features in the poem of the same name by A. A. Milne in the collection When We Were Very Young and in the illustration by E. H. Shepard which accompanied it.

== See also ==
- Police box
- Bartizan
- Guardhouse
- Outpost
- Blockhouse
