= Charles V Wall =

Defensive wall in Gibraltar

- Part of Fortifications of Gibraltar
- Gibraltar
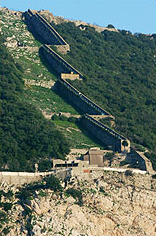
- Upper section of Charles V Wall in the Upper Rock Nature Reserve, Gibraltar

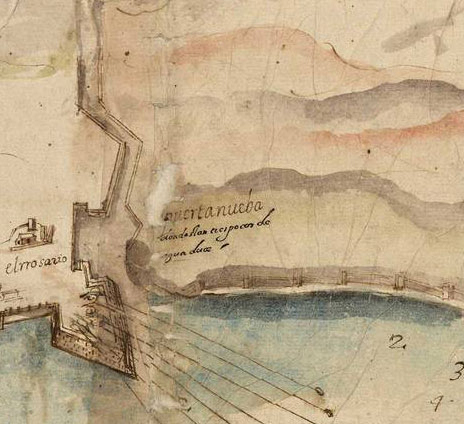
- 1608 plan of the lower portion of the wall, showing lines of fire from the South Bastion, by Cristóbal de Rojas

Site information
- Owner: Government of Gibraltar
- Open to the public: Yes

Location
- Location of the upper section of Charles V Wall (red dot) within Gibraltar
- Coordinates: 36.132143°N 5.348293°W

Site history
- Built: 1540
- Built by: Emperor Charles V

The Charles V Wall is a 16th-century defensive curtain wall that forms part of the fortifications of the British Overseas Territory of Gibraltar. Originally called Muralla de San Benito (English: St. Benedict's Wall), it was built in 1540 and strengthened in 1552 by Holy Roman Emperor Charles V. The wall remains largely intact and extends from South Bastion, which was once at the water's edge in the harbour, to the top ridge of the Rock of Gibraltar.

== Description ==
The lower section of the wall runs up from the South Bastion which was once at the water's edge in the harbour, to Prince Edward's Gate at the base of a steep cliff. It is pierced by the Puerta de África (English: Gate of Africa), which is defended from above by the Flat Bastion.

The upper section of Charles V Wall, somewhat further south, runs from the top of a cliff up to the crest of The Rock. It zigzags up the slope of The Rock in four stages in a configuration that lets the defenders give flanking fire to each face. The Hacho (later the Signal Station) at the top of the wall was once equipped with a small tower.

Another wall continues from the lower section of Charles V Wall almost all the way up to the top of The Rock and known as the Moorish Wall. It was once thought to be an ancient wall from the Moorish period. However, the Muralla de San Reymondo (English: St. Raymond's Wall), also known as the Philip II Wall, was built during the 16th century by King Philip II of Spain as a fallback defensive line.

== Construction ==
At the time the Charles V Wall was built, the Barbary pirates posed the main threat to the city. In September 1540 Gibraltar was attacked by a corsair force led by Piali Hamet, one of Barbarossa's captains. The town was plundered and many of the leading citizens were taken captive. (Note: The captives in the 1540 raid on Gibraltar regained their freedom when a Spanish fleet led by Bernardino de Mendoza intercepted the corsairs on their return to Algiers and defeated them in the Battle of Alborán, a major victory for the Spanish.) The wall, originally called the Muralla de San Benito (English: St. Benedict's Wall), was built in 1540 to help defend The Rock against further attacks from the south.

Starting around 1552 the Italian military engineer Giovanni Battista Calvi made improvements to the wall. Calvi designed a wall that ran west–east in a straight line from the coast for about 280 metres (920 ft) until it reached a precipice. A traverse ran north–south along the top of the cliff, and then a zigzag wall ran up to the crest of the Rock of Gibraltar.

Philip II succeeded Charles V in 1558, and commissioned the Genovese engineer Giovan Giacomo Paleari Fratino to continue the improvements. El Fratino decided that the traverse should be abandoned, and what had been done on Calvi's zigzag wall should be demolished. Instead, an upper wall should continue the line of the lower wall from the top of the cliff to the crest of the rock. (Note: El Fratino's upper wall was completed by 1575, running parallel but to the north of Calvi's upper wall. Fratino's wall today is called the Philip II Wall.) Work was stopped on the traverse, but Philip II's chief engineer Tibúrcio Spanucchi refused to stop work on the zigzag wall, which was eventually finished in 1599, and forms the upper portion of the Charles V Wall. The traverse wall along the top of the cliff was never built.

A 1565 sketch of the wall by Anton van den Wyngaerde shows that it did not then have bastions, but depicted a gatehouse projecting from the wall to the African Gate. The Baluarte de Nuestra Señora del Rosario (now South Bastion) and the Bastión de Santiago (now Flat Bastion) in the lower section of the wall had both been built by 1627. Fratino built the South Bastion, which was possibly improved by Alsatian engineer Daniel Specklin, and built the Flat Bastion.

In 1627 the Spaniard Luis Bravo de Acuña wrote a treatise on the fortifications of Gibraltar for King Philip IV of Spain. He noted the use of strategically placed boulders that a single man could roll down on attackers, and of hoardings above the city gates holding large rocks that could also be dropped down on attackers.

== History ==
In July 1704 combined forces from the United Kingdom and the Dutch Republic led by Sir George Rooke, captured Gibraltar during the War of the Spanish Succession. The Spanish attempted to recapture The Rock in October 1704 during its Twelfth Siege. A force of five hundred volunteers led by Spanish Gibraltar-born goatherd Simón Susarte managed to scale Charles V's Wall, and massacred the guard at Middle Hill, but were attacked by a party of grenadiers and were all either killed or captured.

The Southport Gates were built in place of the old Puerta de África in the lower section of the wall. Deadman's Cemetery used to be located on the inner (north) side of the wall, above the Southport Gates with some of the headstones dating back to 1738. In 1798 Southport Ditch Cemetery (later renamed Trafalgar Cemetery in honour of the Battle of Trafalgar) was consecrated, a small graveyard on the other side of the wall from Deadman's Cemetery. Many of the tombstones are those of victims of the 1804, 1813 and 1814 yellow fever epidemics. Trafalgar Cemetery fell into disuse after 1814. In 1929 Deadman's Cemetery became part of St. Jago's Barracks and was turned into a ball alley and rifle range, with the headstones relocated to Trafalgar Cemetery in 1932 and embedded into one of the walls.

The upper section of Charles V Wall has recently been restored by the Bonita Trust, together with the Government of Gibraltar. The wall is in good condition and is fitted with a handrail and it is possible to walk along it from the foot to the top of The Rock. The upper section of Charles V Wall lies within the Upper Rock Nature Reserve which was established in 1993 and covers about 40% of Gibraltar's total land area. Inglis Way, one of the walks within the reserve begins at Queen's Gate near the foot of the upper section of the wall at Prince Ferdinand's Battery. It leads through a region of esparto grass, white asparagus, common asphodel and germander.

== Gallery ==
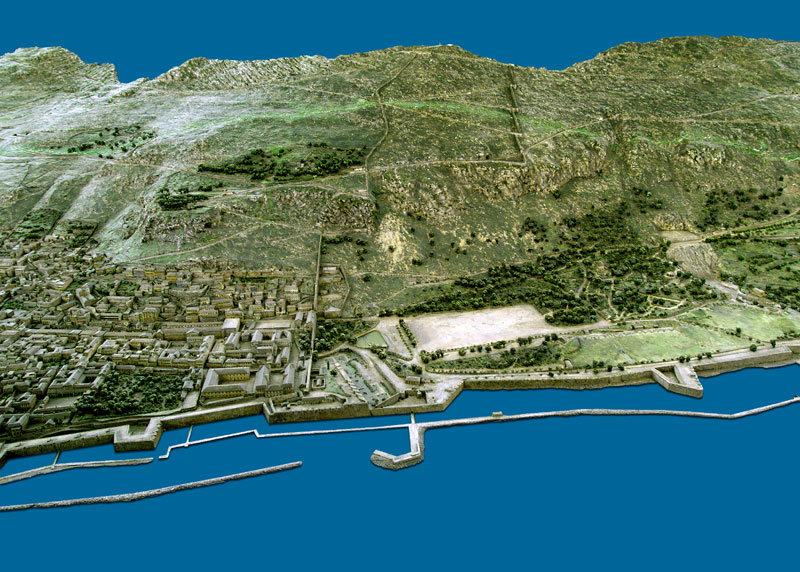
1865 model of Gibraltar from the west. The stepped structure of the upper King Charles V wall is to the right of center at the top. The lower portion, further to the left, runs straight up from the waterfront to the cliff.

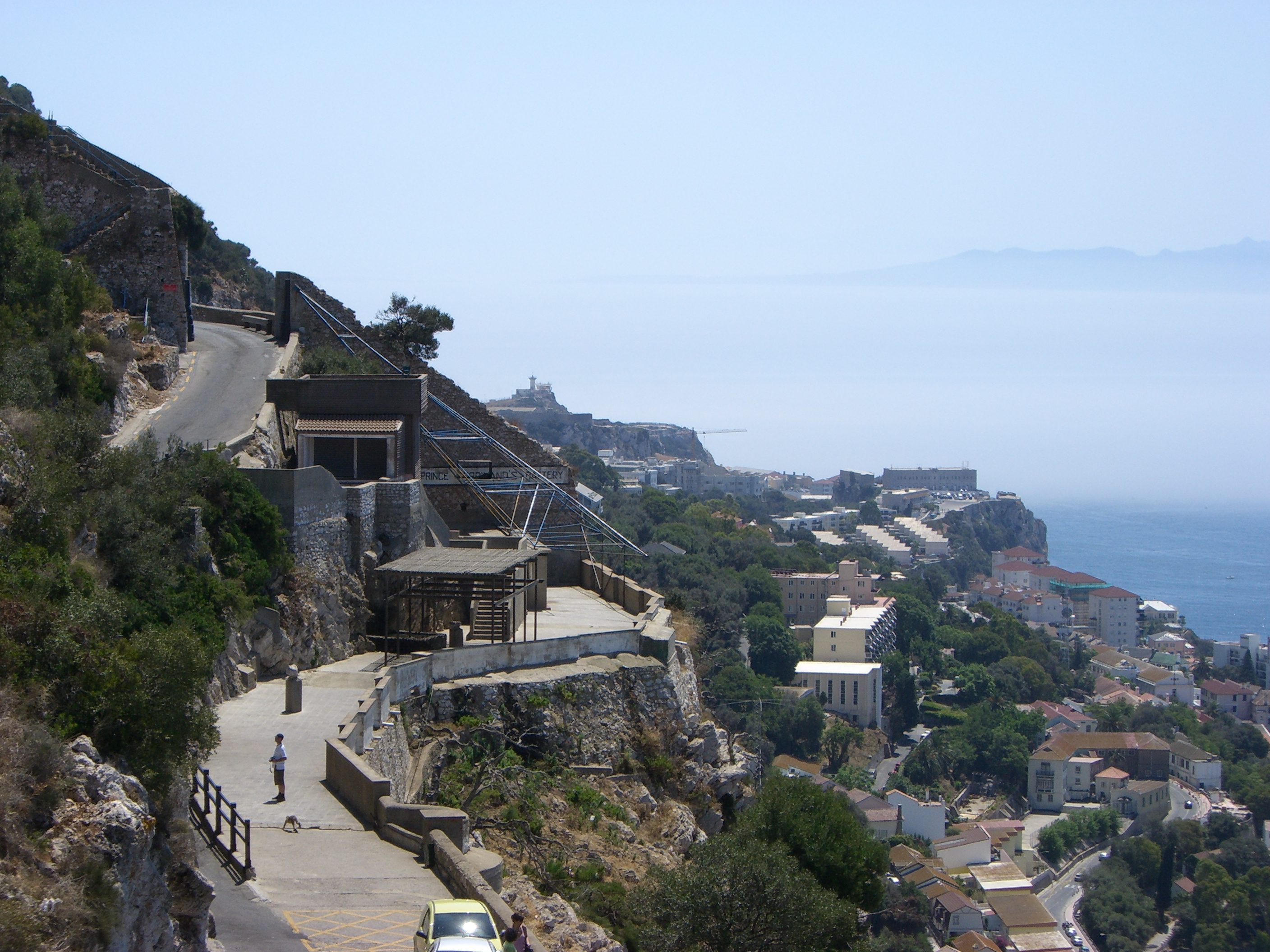
Apes Den: Base of the upper section

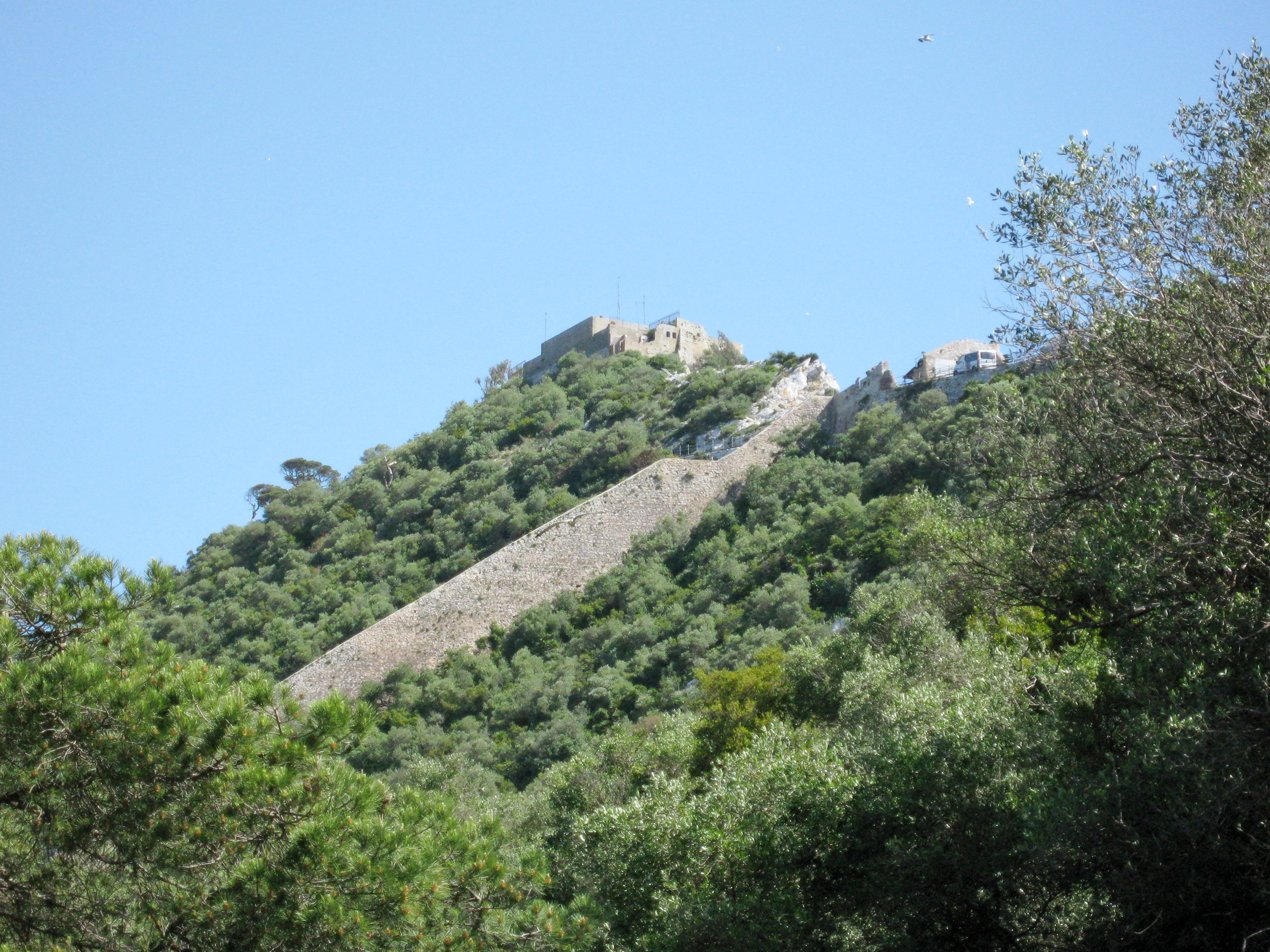
Part of the upper section

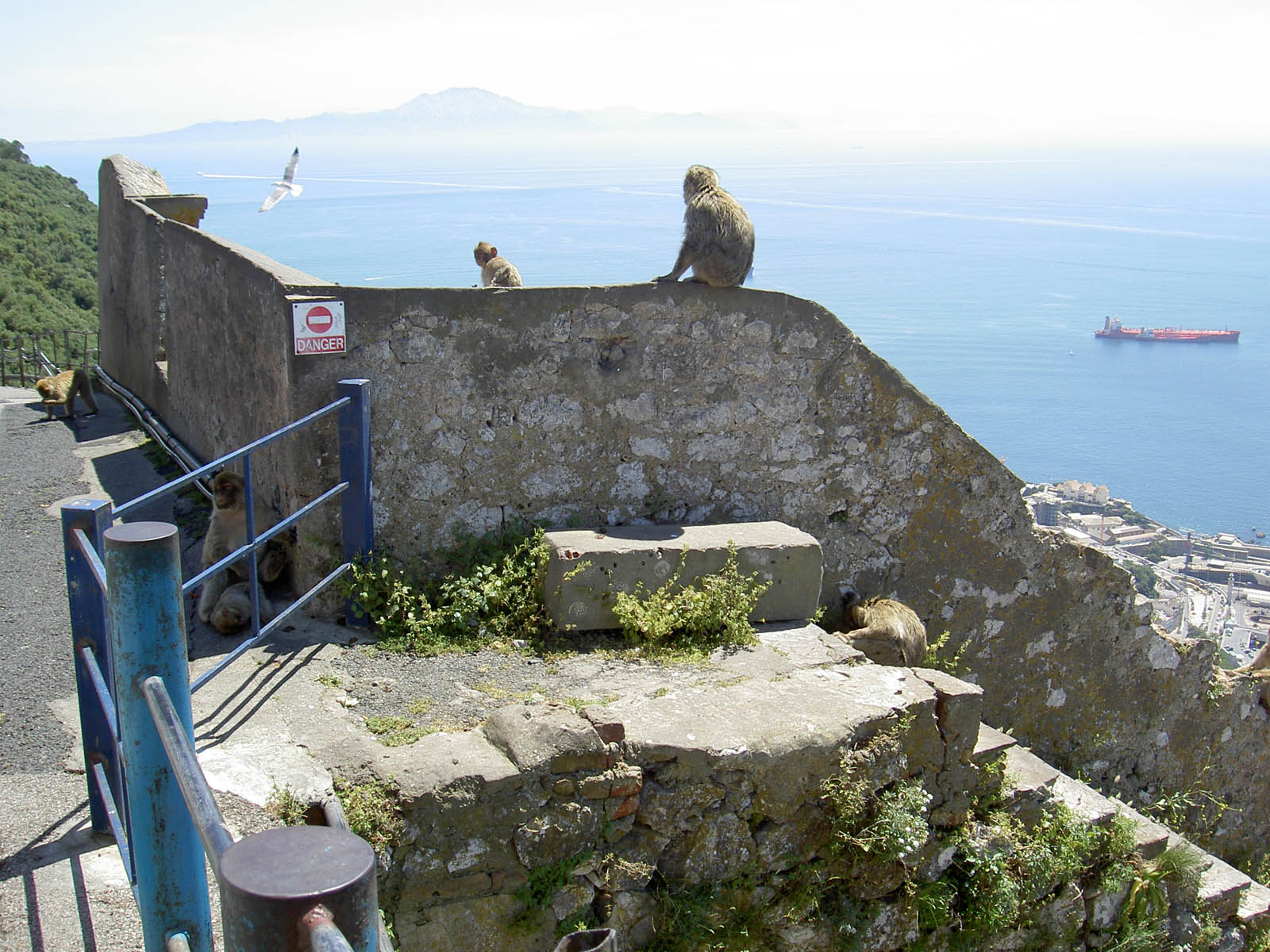

== Sources ==
- Cano, Tristan (2012). "THE CRADLE OF HISTORY Gibraltar, Europe". Travel Through History.
- Chipulina, Neville (2012). "1740 – Skinner's Moorish Wall".
- Drinkwater, John (1786). A history of the late siege of Gibraltar: With a description and account of that garrison, from the earliest periods. Printed by T. Spilsbury. p. 8.
- Fernández Duro, Cesáreo (1895). Armada Española desde la unión de los reinos de Castilla y Aragón. Vol. I. Madrid, Spain: Est. tipográfico.
- Finlayson, Clive; Fa, Darren (31 October 2006). The Fortifications of Gibraltar 1068–1945. Osprey Publishing. ISBN 978-1-84603-016-1.
- "Gibraltar". Fortified Places.
- "Gibraltar Projects – Charles V Wall". Bonita Trust. Archived from the original on 26 January 2013.
- Gilbard, George James (1888). A popular history of Gibraltar, its institutions, and its neighbourhood on both sides of the straits, and a guide book to their principal places and objects of interest ... Garrison Library.
- Perez, Charles; Bensusan, Keith (2005). "A guide to The Upper Rock Nature Reserve" (PDF). The Gibraltar Ornithological and Natural History Society. Archived from the original (PDF) on 10 May 2013.
- The New and complete American encyclopedia: or, Universal dictionary of arts and sciences; on an improved plan: in which the respective sciences are arranged into complete systems, and the arts digested into distinct treatises; also the detached parts of knowledge alphabetically arranged and copiously explained, according to the best authorities. John Low. 1808. p. 84.
- "Trafalgar Cemetery". Discover Gibraltar. Archived from the original on 13 October 2013.
- "Trafalgar Cemetery and Nelson Gibraltar". Costa Sur.
