= Giovan Giacomo Paleari Fratino =

Italian military engineer (1520–1586)

Giovan Giacomo Paleari (El Fratin)
- Born: 1520; Morcote, Lugano District, Old Swiss Confederacy
- Died: 1586 (aged 65–66)
- Occupation: Military engineer
- Known for: First Martello tower

Giovan Giacomo Paleari Fratino (1520–1586), known as El Fratin or Il Fratino ("The Little Friar"), was a military engineer who served the Holy Roman Emperor and King of Spain Emperor Charles V, and then his son Philip II of Spain. He is known for having designed the first Martello tower as well as many other fortifications.

== Family ==
Giovan Giacomo Paleari Fratino came from the Paleari Fratino family of Morcote, a Lombard town near to Lugano which had long been contested between the rulers of Milan and Como. It became part of the Swiss Confederacy in 1517. A military engineer by occupation, his brothers Bernardino and Giorgio followed the same trade, as did Giorgio's son Francesco and grandson Pietro. Giacomo and the other members of his family designed and built fortifications throughout Spanish territory, which at that time also included Portugal, parts of Italy and Presidios in North Africa.

== Martello tower ==
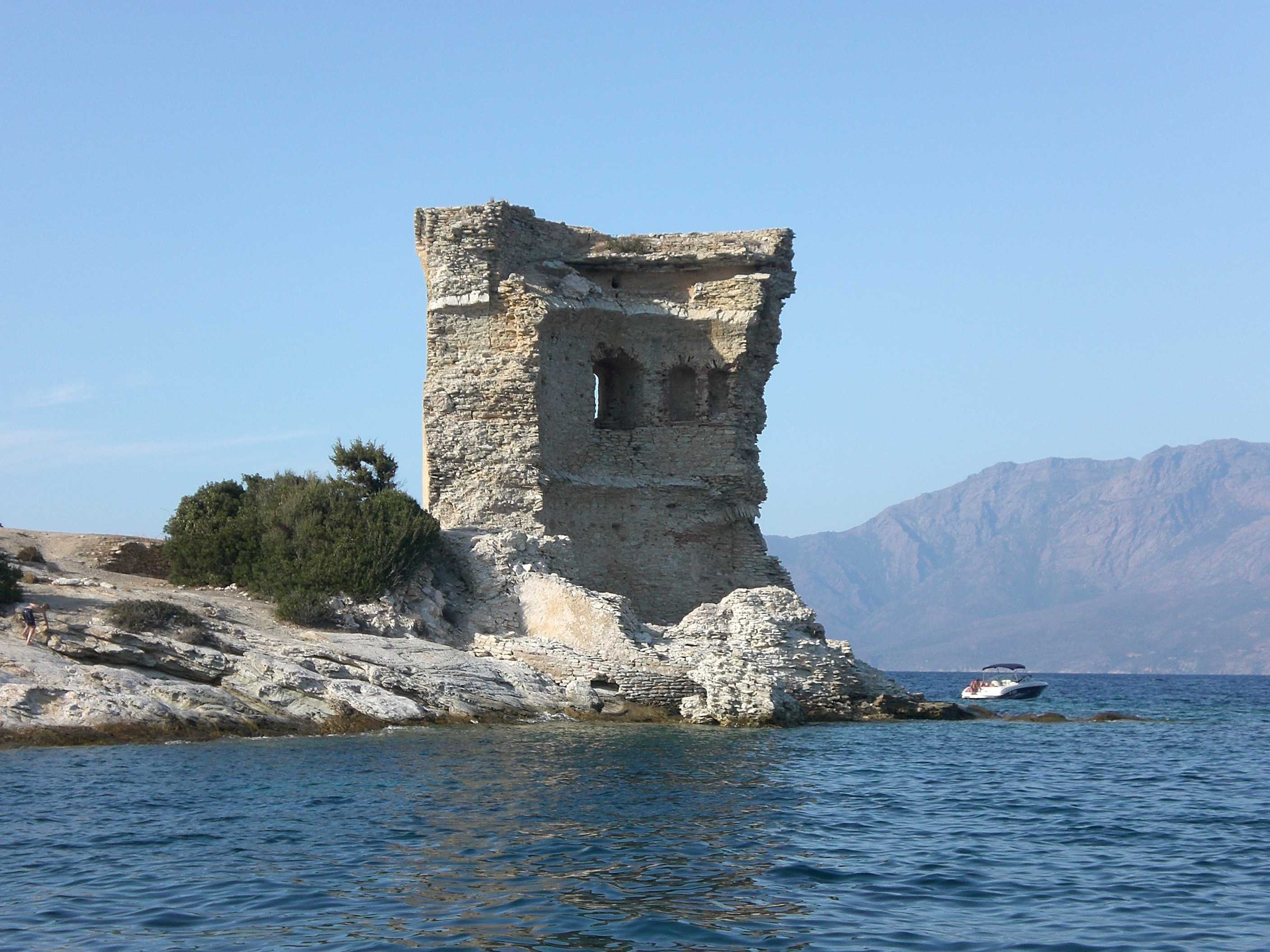
Ruins of the Torra di Mortella at Mortella, Corsica

During the Italian War of 1551–1559, Giovan Fratino initially served in the French army. After being captured by the Spanish in 1558, he joined the army of Philip II. Giovan and his brother Giorgio were assigned to the Governor of Milan, tasked with strengthening the old Sforza Castle. In 1563 his services were lent to the Genoese, allies of Spain, to help with the defenses of Corsica. Fratino arrived in Corsica on 29 January 1563, accompanied by Colonel Giorgio Doria. He spent the rest of the year on the island, improving the Calvi, Ajaccio, Bastia and Bonifacio citadels and establishing new fortifications along the coast. On 30 December 1563, after he had left the island, he gave the Genoese a diagram and building instructions for the tower at Mortella Point, which was to help defend the town of San Fiorenzo by protecting the entrance to the gulf. These have been preserved in the archives of Genoa.

The tower was built between 1564 and October 1565. Typical towers at that time were square and had a defending machicolation. Fratino designed a 3-story cylindrical tower with a rooftop gun platform, and with no machicolation, an innovative design that was only accepted after some resistance. The Torra di Mortella in what is now the Saint-Florent, Haute-Corse was the first of what became known as Martello towers. (Note: Corsica, long a possession of Genoa, was successfully invaded by the French assisted by the Turks in the summer of 1553. By November of that year the Genovese Admiral Andrea Doria had begun a counter-attack. According to the French Ministry of Culture, the Mortello tower was built by Doria in 1553–1554 rather than in 1565. Possibly this is due to confusion between Admiral Andrea Doria and Colonel Giorgio Doria, who was responsible for building the fortifications.) Such towers were typically used to protect a vulnerable shoreline, and were round structures about 10 to 15 metres (33 to 49 ft) high, with very thick, mortar-bound walls. The fort would hold heavy artillery in the upper level, with accommodations for fifteen or twenty soldiers on the ground floor. The name comes from the location of the tower at Mortella (Myrtle) Point on the island. In 1794 the garrison of the Torre della Mortella resisted two British frigates with over 100 guns between them for two days. The tower had just one 6-pounder gun and two 18-pounders. Although it was eventually captured by a landing force, the performance was so impressive that Britain, and later the United States, built copies of it around the world.

== Gibraltar ==
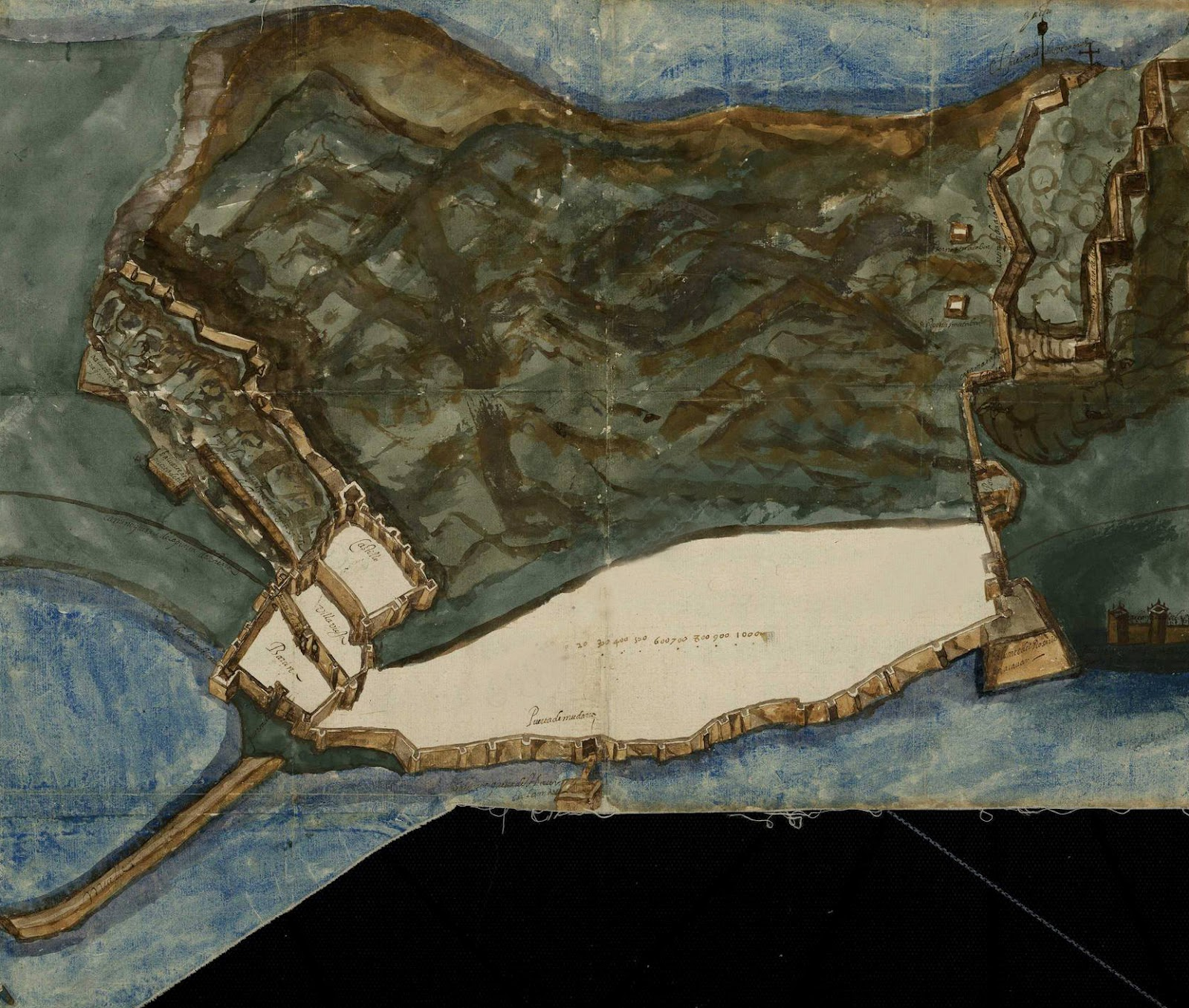
Fortifications of Gibraltar in 1597 viewed from the west. Fratino was responsible for bastions at both ends of the sea wall, and for the northern (left) of the two upper walls

In Gibraltar, Charles V had commissioned the engineer Giovanni Battista Calvi to construct a wall that would defend Gibraltar from attackers landing on the tip of the peninsula to the south. Calvi designed a wall that ran in a straight line eastward from the coast for about 280 metres (920 ft), terminating on the foot of a precipice. A traverse wall would run southward along the top of the cliff, and then a zigzag wall would continue eastward up to the crest of the Rock of Gibraltar. Work began on these defenses. Philip II of Spain succeeded Charles V in 1558, and commissioned El Fratino to improve the defenses. El Fratino decided that the traverse should be abandoned, and what had been done on the zigzag wall should be demolished. Work on the traverse ceased, but Philip II's chief engineer Tibúrcio Spannocchi refused allow demolition of the zigzag wall, and it was eventually finished in 1599. It is the upper portion of what is now called the Charles V Wall.

In the meantime, a wall designed by El Fratino had been completed by 1575, running straight up from the precipice above the end of the lower wall. This wall is usually called the "Moorish Wall" through a mistake about when it was built, or sometimes the Philip II Wall. El Fratino's brothers Giorgio and Bernadino may have assisted him in this work. Plans for the traverse wall along the top of the cliff were abandoned. El Fratino converted a tower in the northeast to a bastion, the Baluarte San Pablo (English: St. Paul's Bastion, now North Bastion). He built a small bastion at the south-west corner of Charles V Wall, the Baluarte de Nuestra Señora del Rosario (English: Our Lady of the Rosary Bastion). This bastion was later incorporated into the South Bastion, probably by Daniel Specklin.

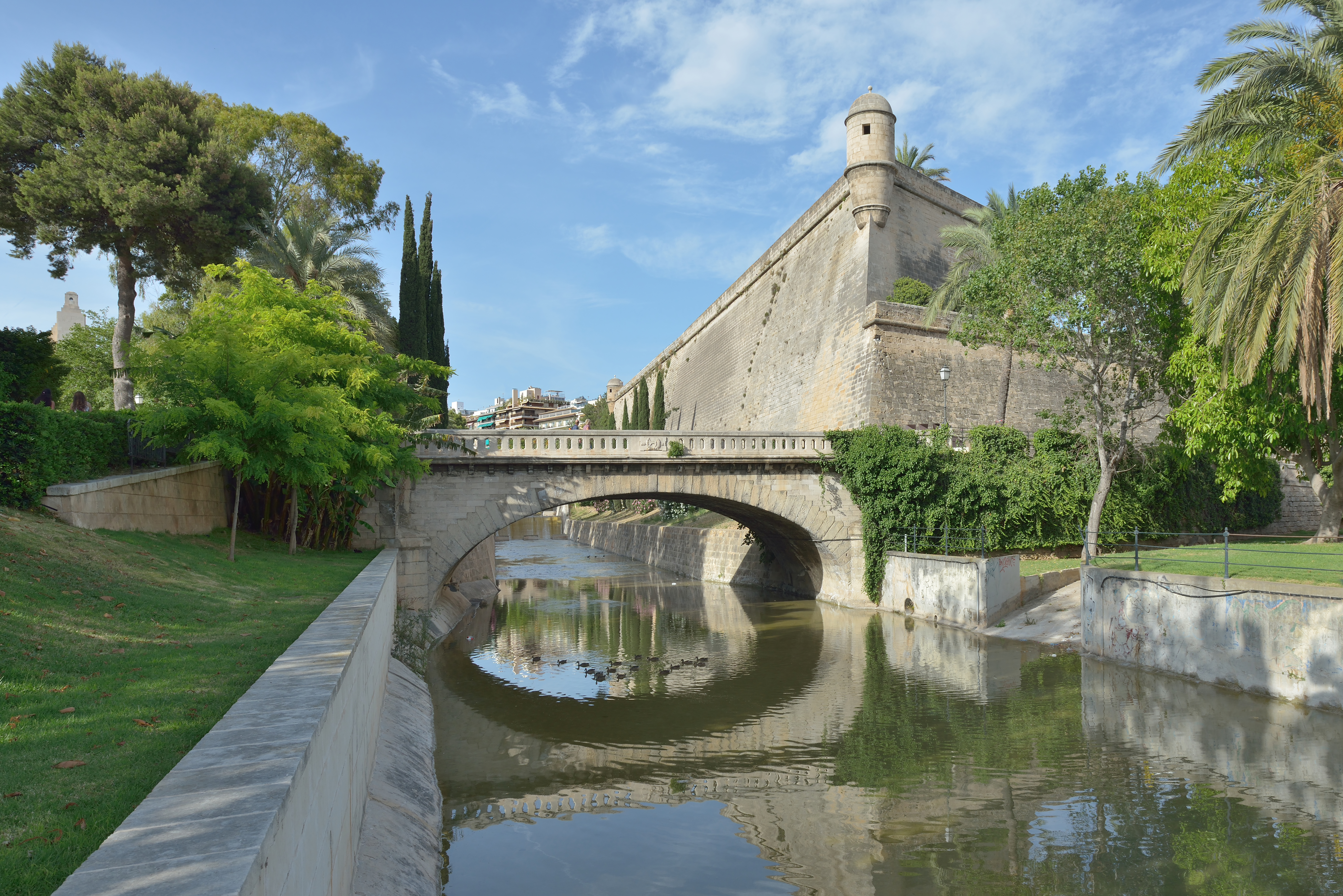
City wall bastion of Sant Pere by Paleari in Palma de Mallorca, Balearic Islands

== Other fortifications ==
Malta occupies a strategic position in the Mediterranean. The Ottoman Sultan Suleiman the Magnificent attacked in May 1565. The island was held by the knights of the Order of St John, who had been given Malta and the port of Tripoli on the North African coast by Charles V of Spain in 1530. If Malta fell, Philip II's possessions of Sicily and the Kingdom of Naples would be threatened. The four-month Siege of Malta was lifted in September 1565, but the island was ruined. The Grand Master Jean Parisot de la Valette determined to rebuild, choosing the high ground of Mount Sciberras as the site for the new fortress. The military engineer Francesco Laparelli was commissioned to undertake construction, and the foundation stone of the new city of Valletta was laid in March 1566. Philip II sent el Fratino to check the design of the fortifications. Giacomo Bosio has recorded the discourse between el Fratino and Laparelli that took place early in April 1566.

King Philip II of Spain built the fortifications at Pamplona, starting in 1569, to designs by Giacomo Palearo and Vespasiano Gonzaga. The citadel in the south of the town is a regular pentagon, and the city itself was bounded by walls that made it almost a regular hexagon. Paleari and Giovanni Battista Antonelli also assisted Vespasiano Gonzaga in the design of the fortifications of Cartagena in 1570. In March 1571, Il Fratino and Vespasiano Gonzaga were sent to inspect the defenses of the frontier between Spain and Navarre. In Portugal, he designed the Fort of São Filipe de Setúbal. In North Africa, Il Fratino overhauled the defenses of the Spanish presidios, or military posts, at Melilla on the coast of Morocco and at La Goletta in Tunisia, finishing the latter fortifications in the summer of 1573. In 1574 he visited Majorca, still considered vulnerable to Turkish attack despite the Turkish defeat three years before in the Battle of Lepanto.
