= Albarquel fort =

Fort in Portugal

Albarquel Fort
- Forte de Albarquel
- Setúbal, Portugal
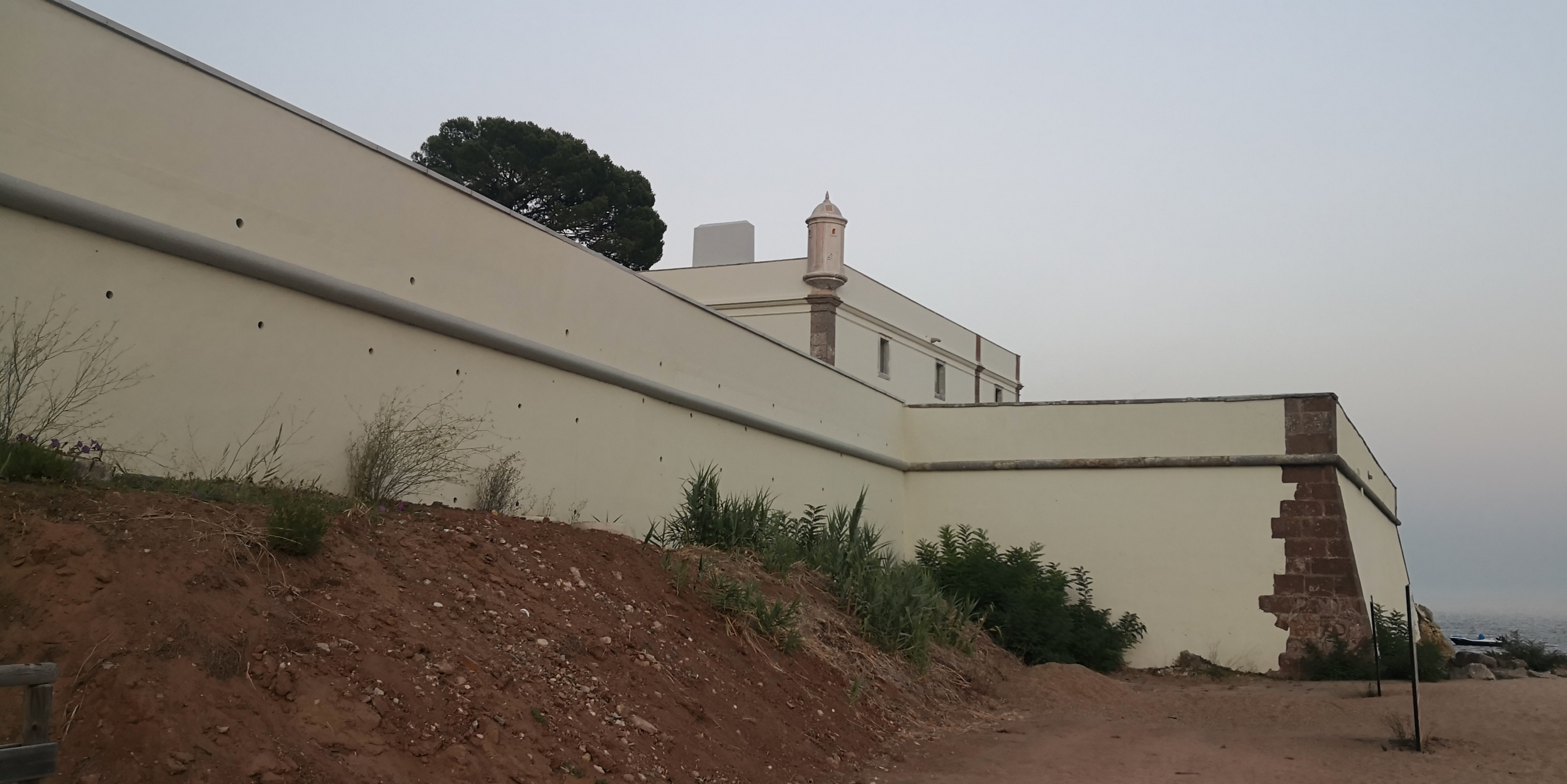

Site information
- Type: Bastion fort
- Open to the public: Yes.
- Condition: Good.

Location
- Coordinates: 38°30′40″N 8°54′48″W

Site history
- Built: 17th century
- In use: 17th-19th century.

The Albarquel Fort (Forte de Albarquel in Portuguese) is located on the beach of the same name, on the northern banks of the mouth of the river Sado, in the Municipality and District of Setúbal, in Portugal.

== History ==
In the past, it was part of the defensive line of the stretch of coast known today as Costa Azul, and which, in the 17th century, extended from Albarquel to Sesimbra, complementing the defense of the important maritime village of Setúbal.

In the context of the complete remodeling of the defensive strategy of the kingdom implemented under the reign of John IV (1640-1656), included in the defense of the bar of Setúbal, this maritime fortification was initiated, alongside the Fort of Santiago do Outão. Work began in 1643 and its purpose was to reinforce the neighboring Fort São Filipe de Setúbal.

At the time, the owners of the salt pans and the sailors of the brotherhood of Casa do Corpo Santo contributed to the works of this fort, like those of Outão, and was completed under the reign of Peter II (1667-1706).

The Governor of the Fort of Albarquel, was inherently the Chief-Guardian of the Salt de Setúbal, a hereditary position belonging to the Botelho de Moraes Sarmento family. The title of Guarda-Mor do Sal de Setúbal, was granted by King Philip IV of Spain, and rectified by John IV to Diogo Botelho de Moraes Sarmento, 1st Guarda-Mor of the Salt de Setúbal, António Manoel Botelho de Moraes Sarmento, 6th Guardian-Major of the salt of Setúbal having been the last Governor of the Fort of Albarquel in this family.

It was deactivated in 1883.

=== From the 20th century to the present day ===
Owned by the Ministry of Defence, until 1999 it was part of the nearby Coast Artillery Regiment of the Portuguese Army, with the designation of Oitava Bataria, now extinct.

After World War II, an underground fort was erected on the hill behind the fort, with three 150 mm Krupp cannons, and garrisoned by about 30 men. The new facilities included barracks, messhall, magazines, electrical power-station and warehouses and formed part of the Barron Plan for the defence of Lisbon and Setúbal.

In 2001, by Notice of the Council of Ministers dated 21 June, the land would pass to the Municipality of Setúbal, which would take possession of it in 2015. At the beginning of 2004 it was abandoned, its requalification as a hotel being considered.

The fortification was provided free of charge by the Government to the Municipality of Setúbal in January 2015 and will remain in the possession of the municipality for 32 years. Renovation was in part funded by the foundation of the English philanthropist Helen Hamlyn. Work began on 2018 and it opened to the public on July 10 2021.

The fort was transformed into a cultural center, for exhibitions, conferences, workshops and shows.

The Buehler-Brockhaus Foundation, made up of a German couple living in Setúbal, will build a walkway to connect the Urban Park of Albarquela to the beach.

== Features ==
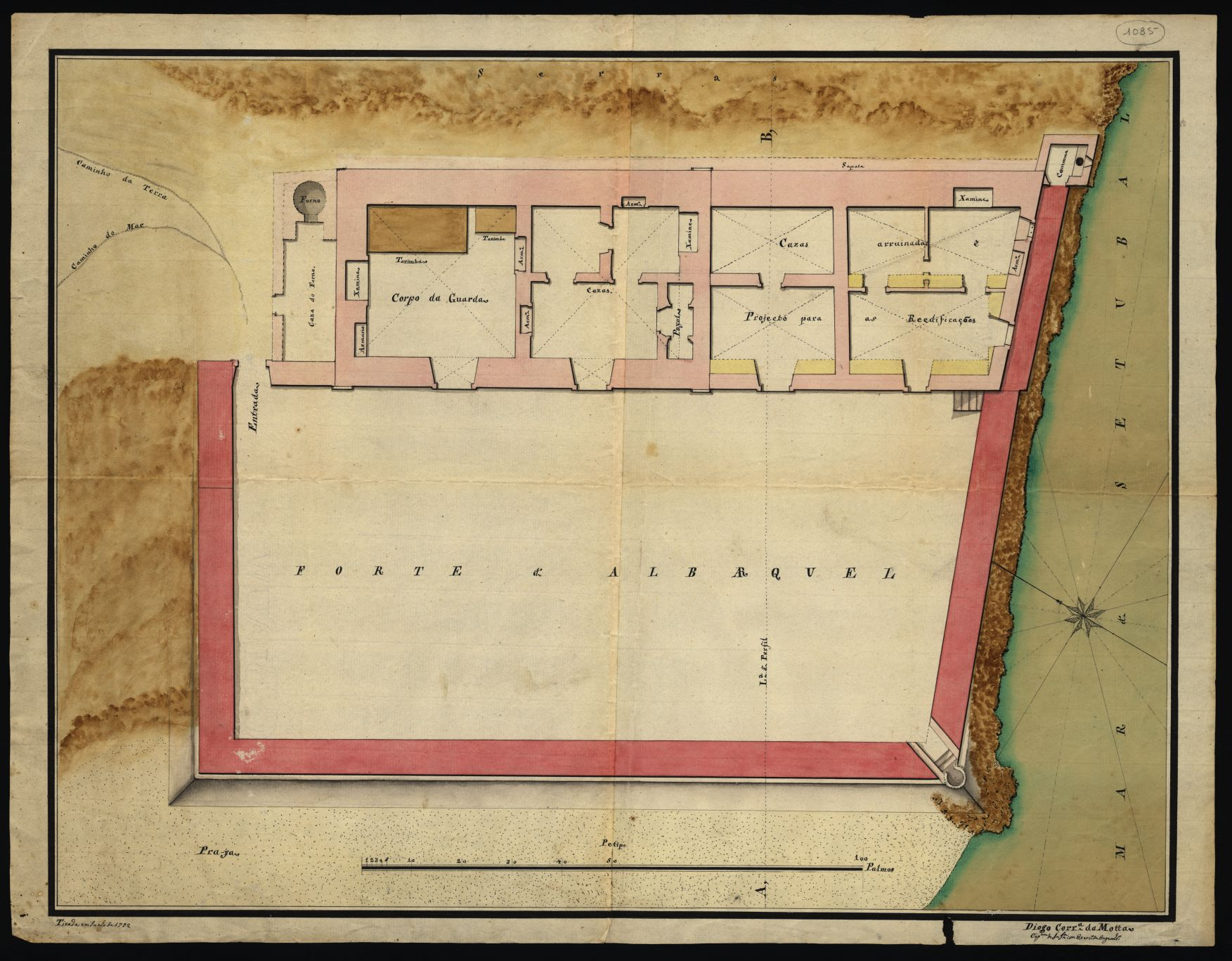
18th century plan of the fort.

The fort was built in a plain, baroque style. has a trapezoid shape, with a small bastion at the southeast corner and a guardhouse at the south, both facing the sea. On the northeast side of the courtyard-of-arms stands the building with the service dependencies.

The gate-of-arms opens at the northern side.

== Gallery ==
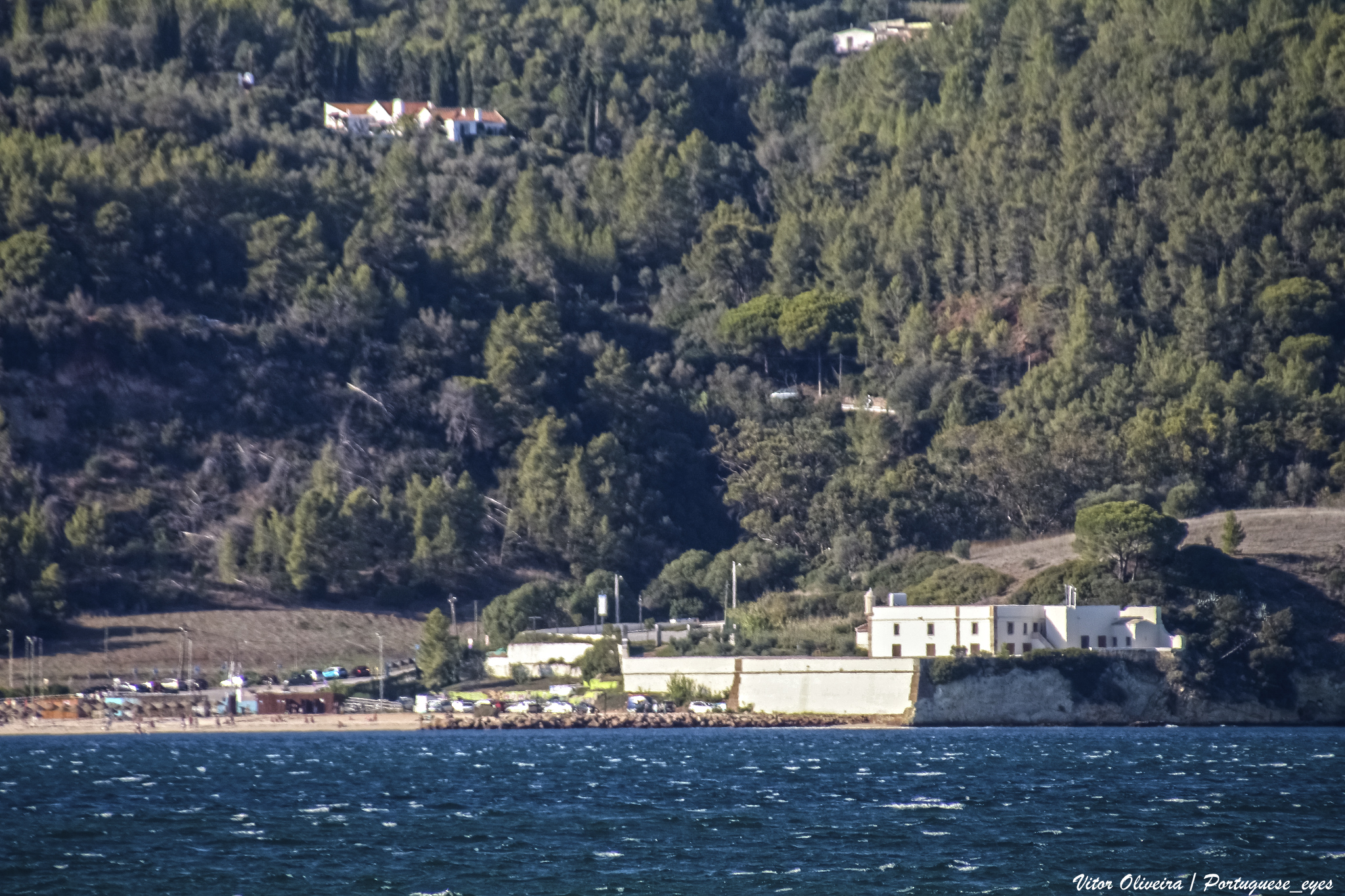
Far view from across the Sado River mouth

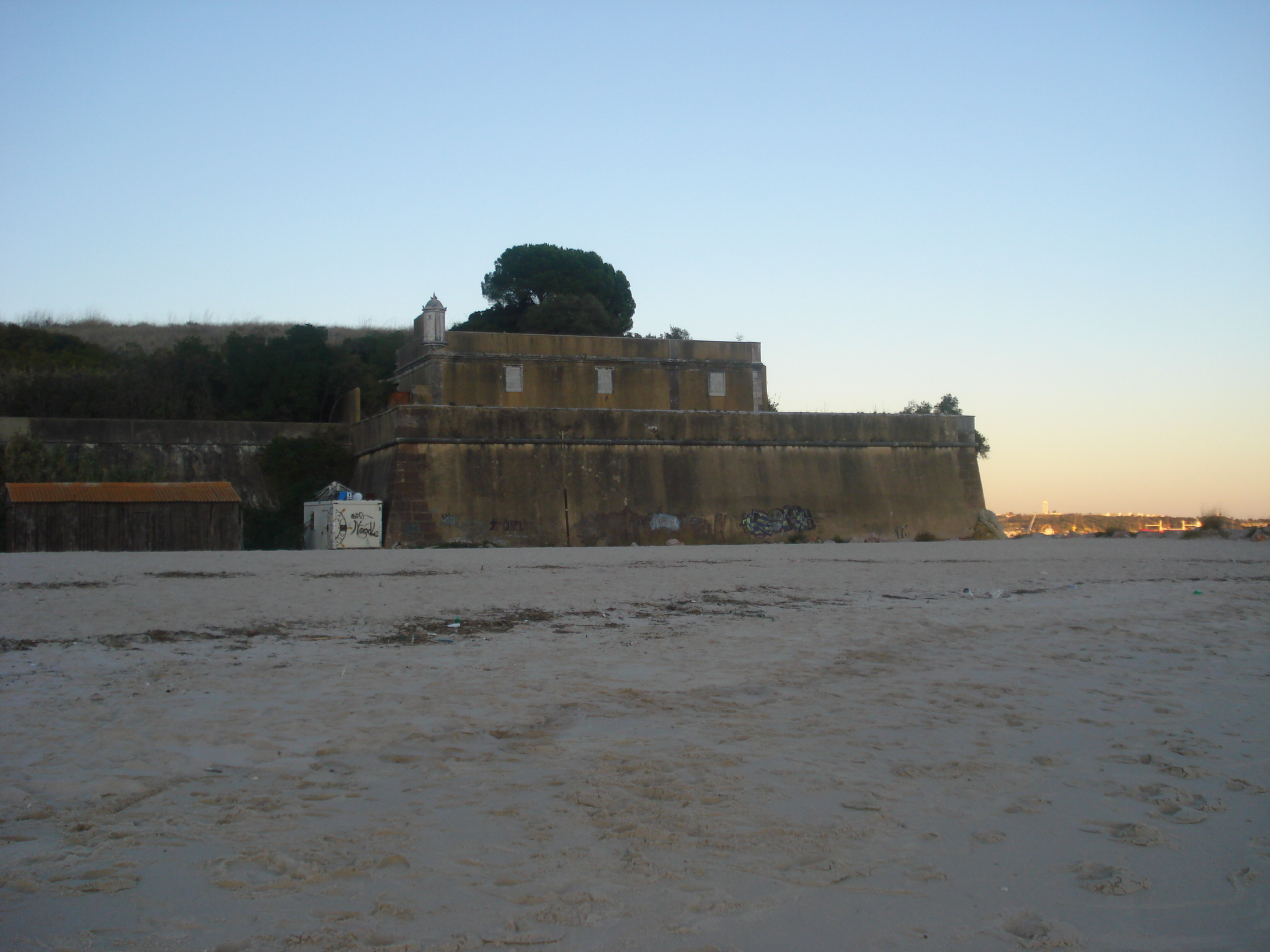
Beach-side view before the renovations.

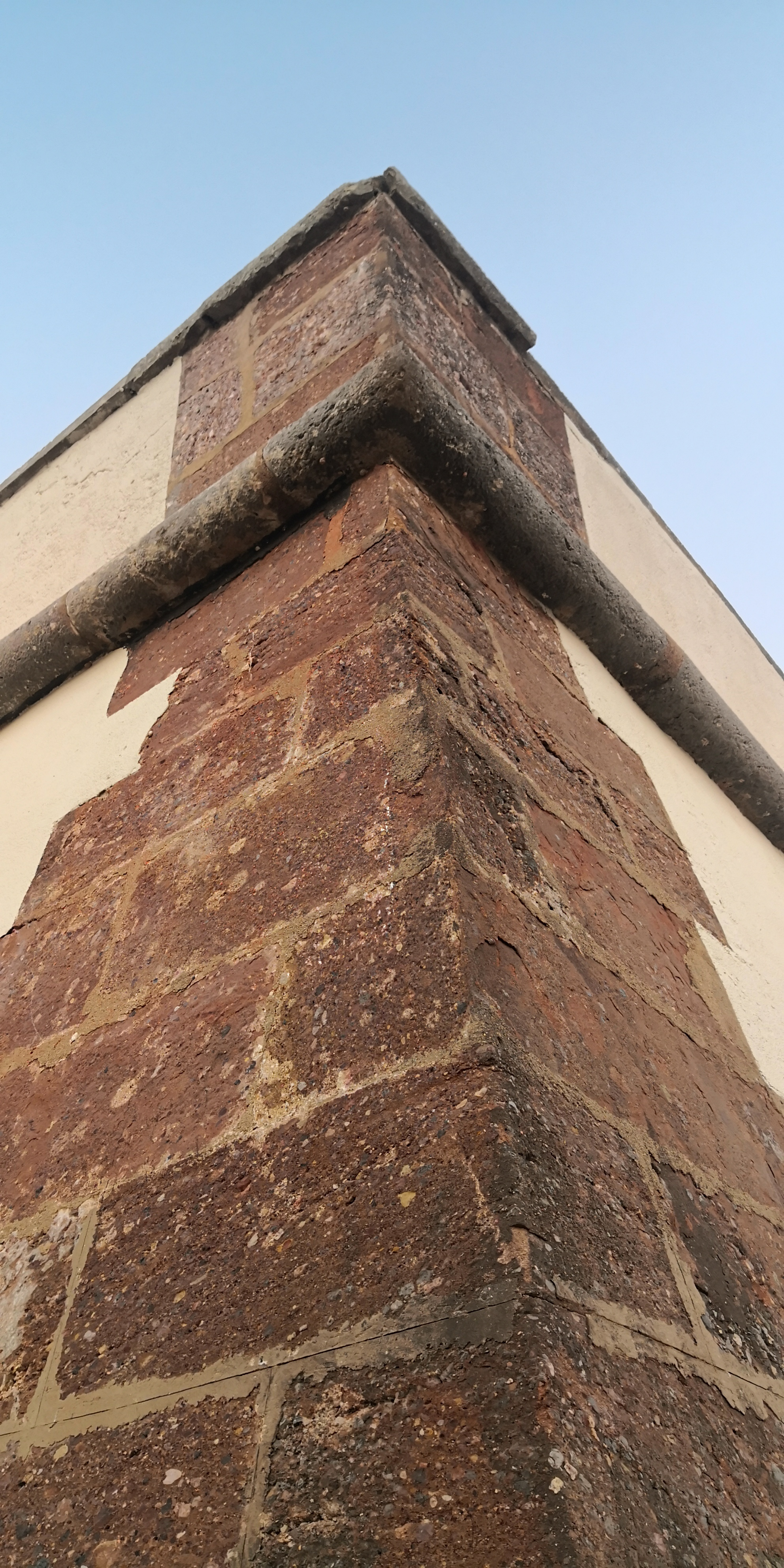
West side of the fort.

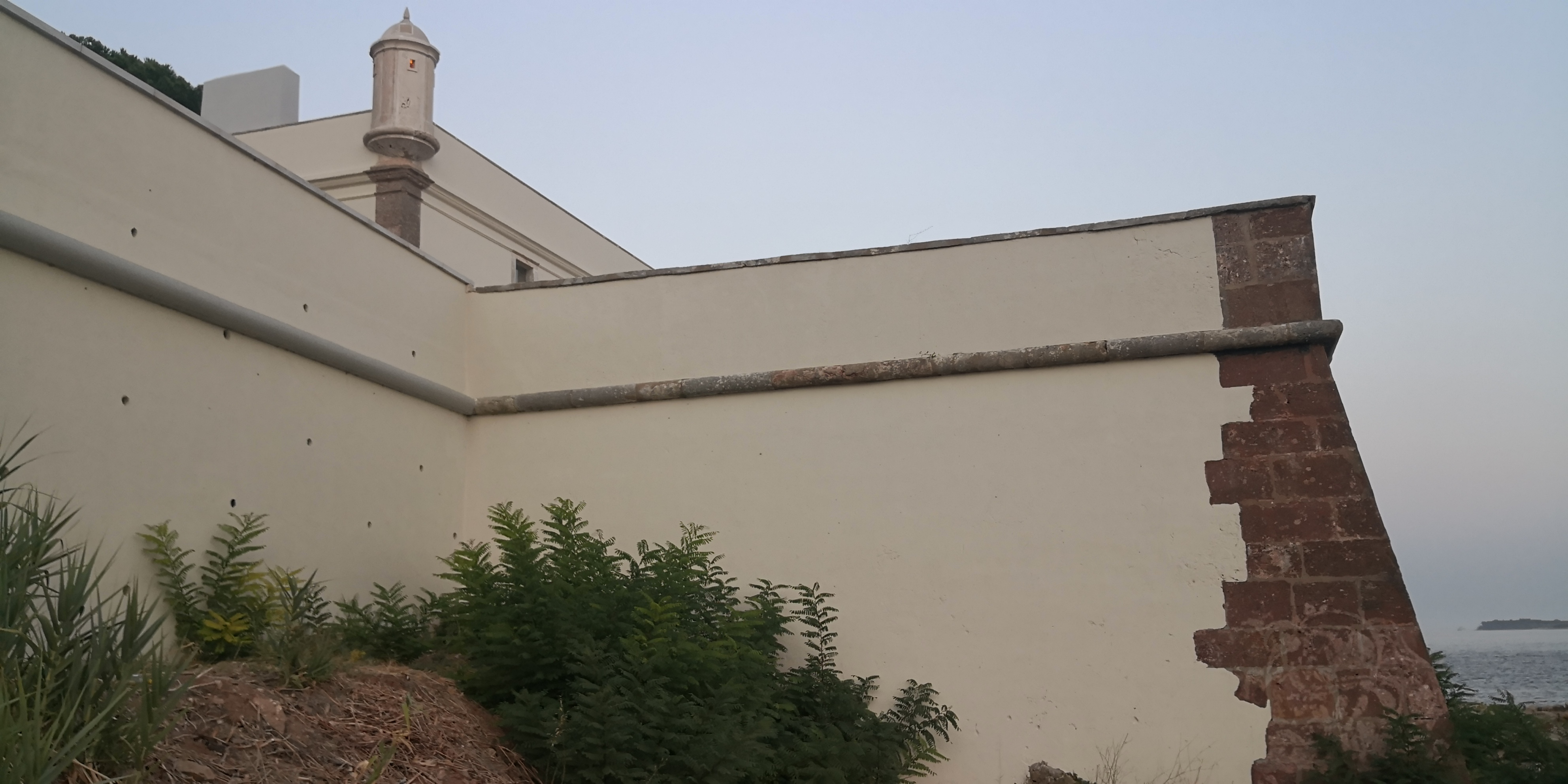
Corner.

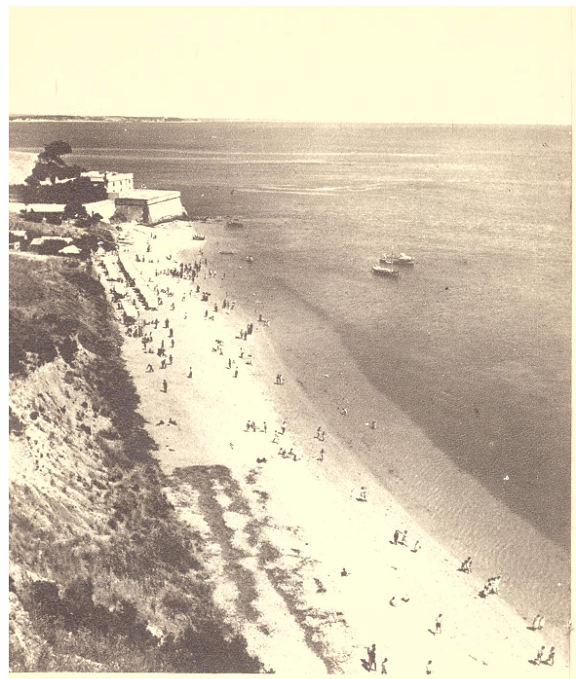
Mid 20th century photograph.
