= Moorish Wall =

Defensive wall in Gibraltar

- Muralla de San Reymondo
- Part of Fortifications of Gibraltar
- Upper Rock Nature Reserve, Gibraltar
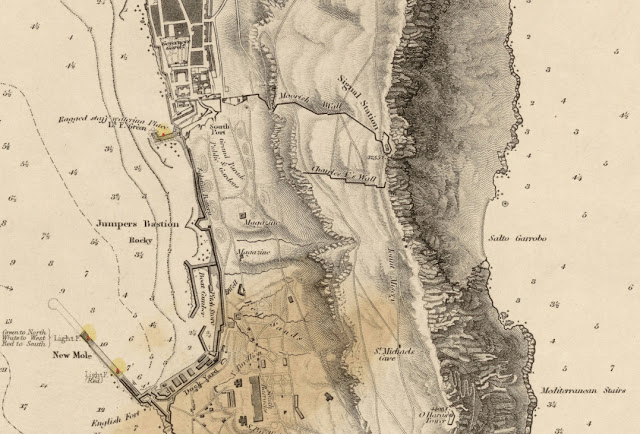
- Detail of an 1831 map of Gibraltar by W.H. Smythe showing the two southern defensive walls: Moorish Wall to the north and Charles V Wall to the south.

Site information
- Owner: Government of Gibraltar
- Open to the public: Yes

Location
- Location of the Moorish Wall within Gibraltar.
- Coordinates: 36.134553°N 5.348977°W

Site history
- Built: 1558
- Built by: Philip II of Spain

The Moorish Wall, also known as the Philip II Wall (Note: Although misleading, the name "Moorish Wall" was used in the past when the wall was thought to be an ancient wall from the Moorish period.) and formerly the Muralla de San Reymondo (English: St. Raymond's Wall), is a defensive curtain wall built in the 16th century that formed part of the southern fortifications of the British Overseas Territory of Gibraltar. It was completed by 1575. The wall ran from the top of a steep cliff above the lower section of the Charles V Wall up the slope of the Rock of Gibraltar to its crest, north of the upper section of the Charles V Wall and is now within the Upper Rock Nature Reserve.

== Charles V Wall ==
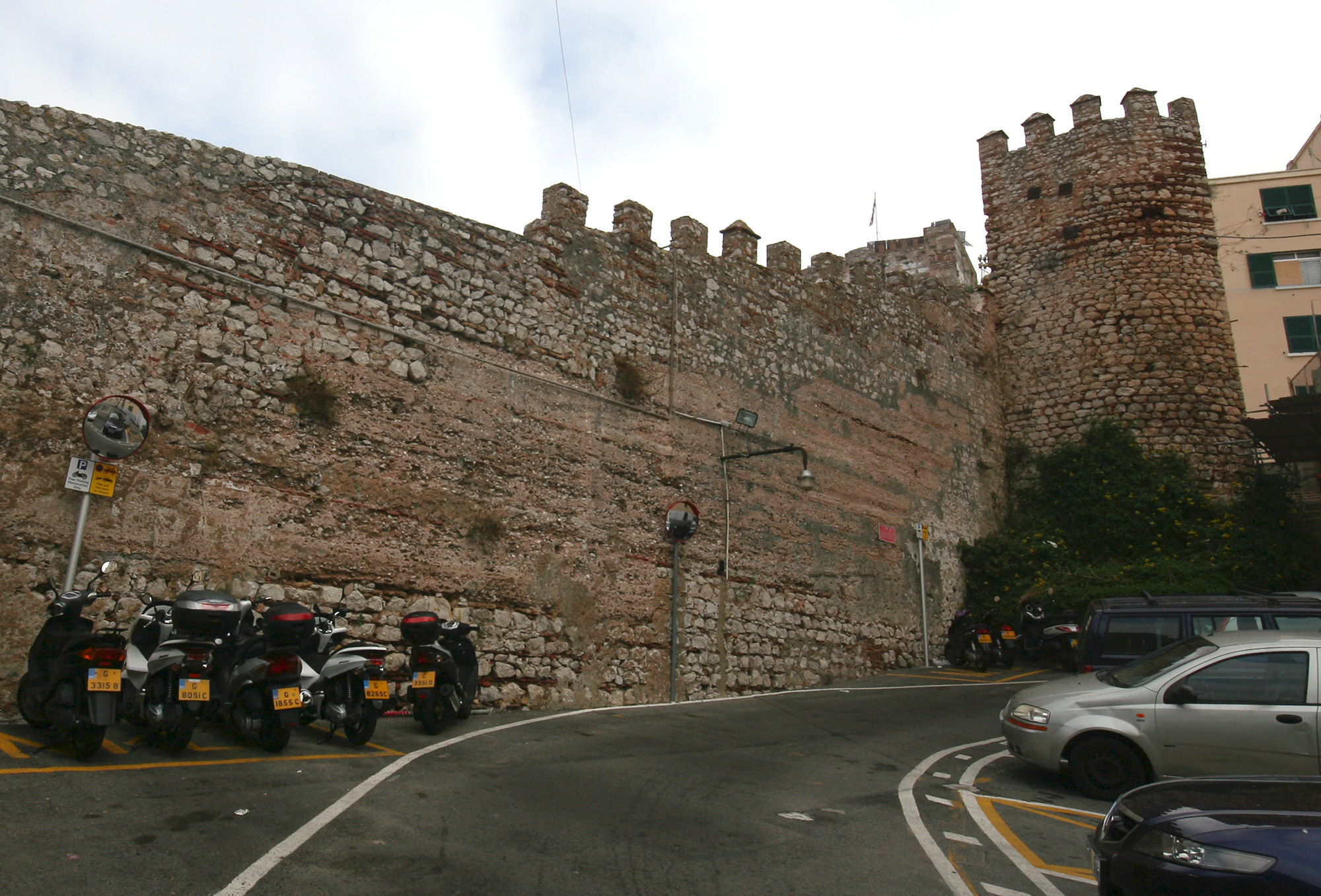
Section of the Moorish city wall with a tower in the Moorish Castle Estate, Gibraltar

In September 1540 an Ottoman force commanded by Barbarossa attacked Gibraltar and took more than seventy prisoners as slaves. The Charles V Wall, originally called the Muralla de San Benito (English: St. Benedict's Wall), was built in 1540 to help defend The Rock against further attacks from the south. Starting around 1552 the Italian military engineer Giovanni Battista Calvi made improvements to the wall. Calvi designed a wall that ran west–east in a straight line from the coast for about 280 metres (920 ft) until it reached a precipice. A traverse ran north–south along the top of the cliff, and then a zigzag wall ran up to the crest of The Rock.

== Construction of the Moorish Wall ==
Philip II of Spain succeeded Charles V in 1558, and commissioned the Genoese engineer Giovan Giacomo Paleari Fratino to continue the improvements to Gibraltar's fortifications. El Fratino decided that the traverse should be abandoned, and that the work already completed on Calvi's zigzag wall should be demolished. Instead, he believed an upper wall should continue the line of the lower wall from the top of the cliff to the crest of The Rock. El Fratino's upper wall was completed by 1575, running parallel but to the north of Calvi's zigzag upper wall. It runs up the slope of The Rock to the Signal Station.

Work was stopped on the traverse, but Philip II's chief engineer Tibúrcio Spannocchi refused to stop work on the zigzag wall, which was eventually finished in 1599, and forms the upper portion of the Charles V Wall. The traverse wall along the top of the cliff was never built. Thus the Moorish Wall became a fallback defensive line. A 1786 book described the defenses as follows:

Above the precipice, an old Moorish wall is continued to the ridge of The Rock; in front of which a curtain with loop-holes and redans (built in the reign of the Emperor Charles V, and called after his name) extends to the top, effectually cutting off all communication in that quarter. Between the Moorish and Charles the Vth's walls, is the signal-house; whence the guard, on a serene and clear day, have almost an unbounded view of the Mediterranean...
