= Helen Hamlyn =

English philanthropist (born 1934)

The Right Honourable The Lady Hamlyn CBE
- Born: Helen Roice Jones; 28 March 1934 (age 92); London, England
- Education: St Christopher School; Royal College of Art
- Occupations: Designer and philanthropist
- Known for: Philanthropy
- Spouses: Patrick Guest (m. 1957, divorced); Paul Hamlyn (m. 1970; died 2001)

Helen Hamlyn, Baroness Hamlyn CBE (née Jones; born 28 March 1934) is an English designer and philanthropist who heads the Helen Hamlyn Trust.

== Life and career ==
Helen Roice Jones was born in London in 1934. Her father, E. William Jones, an engineer, died during World War II. She and her sister, Margaret O'Rorke, a light maker in fine porcelain, attended the progressive co-educational St Christopher School in Letchworth. Hamlyn then went on to the Royal College of Art where she graduated as a fashion designer. After graduation, she became a designer at Cresta Silks where she remained for 15 years. Her marriage to architect Patrick Guest in 1957 ended in divorce. In 1970 she married Paul Hamlyn, Baron Hamlyn, a publisher and philanthropist.

Together, Paul and Helen bought in the 1980s the 13th-century Chateau de Bagnols in Beaujolais. After four years of restoration, it opened in 1992 as "one of the world's most famous and exclusive hotels." In recognition of her work, she was named a Chevalier de l'Ordre des Artes et Lettres by the French government.

== Philanthropy ==
In 1984, Paul Hamlyn gave to his wife as her 50th birthday present her own foundation, the Helen Hamlyn Trust. One aim of the trust is to fund projects that improve people's lives. Her interests include the design of products to be used by people of all ages, and the restoration and re-use of the Albarquel fort in Setúbal, Portugal.

== Awards and honours ==
Hamlyn's charitable work has been recognized by many institutions in the UK and abroad. She was named a CBE in 2019. She has received honorary doctorates from Fordham University (2004), the Rochester Institute of Technology (2014) and the Royal College of Art (2016). She was designated an honorary graduate of Imperial College London (2006). Her honorary fellowships include the Royal College of Art (1994), City and Guilds of London Institute (2012), the Royal Institute of British Architects (2022), and University College London (2023).

In February 2013, Helen Hamlyn was assessed as one of the 100 most powerful women in the UK by Woman's Hour on BBC Radio 4.
