= La Ventosilla =

- Location within Spain

General information
- Location: Spain
- Coordinates: 41.716036°N 3.821421°W
- Groundbreaking: 1606
- Client: Juan Fernandez de Velasco

Design and construction
- Architects: Tibúrcio Spannochi; Jeronimo del Soto

La Ventosilla is a large "country house" near Burgos in Spain that was built at the start of the seventeenth century for Juan Fernandez de Velasco, the Constable of Castille.

The palace today has been converted for use as a rural hotel. The architecture is almost intact, including decorative features such as mouldings and balcony railings. Of the many rooms on three floors, eighteen are open to the public, some still decorated in traditional Castilian style.

== History ==
The property has been documented as far back as the 12th century AD, occupied by various noble families.

=== Location features ===
The forest of the Ventosilla was a favored place for hunting both before and after the house was built. The palace was to provide a comfortable place for the Constable to stay during the hunting season.

=== Construction and design ===
Two military engineers in the service of the king were commissioned for the construction, Tibúrcio Spannochi and Jeronimo del Soto. The builder's contract of 3 October 1604 says that the work was to follow the engineers' plans. A color drawing from that time has been preserved in the library of the royal palace, representing the whole territory of the Ventosilla, surrounded by forest. By its style it seems clear that the plan was made by the engineers as a study of the territory in which the house would be built.

The design included stoves and three stone fireplaces, a supply of water to the house, drains to remove waste water and other luxuries. The building was given a rustic character with masonry exterior walls. The building is austere, functional and solid.

=== Ownership ===
The property was inherited by Francisco Gómez de Sandoval, Duke of Lerma, and he may have initiated some changes to the original building. Lerma was a favorite of Philip III of Spain, and the two men would have used the privacy of the house to relax and also to deal with state affairs uninterrupted.

In 1722 the English heard news that the Duke of Ormond had announced that he was going to spend the summer at Ventosilla, now property of the Duke of Medina Celi, but it was suspected that he was using the trip to cover plans to sail to England to lead the rebel there.
