= Donald Wilkinson =

Scottish cricketer

Personal information
- Full name: Donald John Wilkinson
- Born: 14 February 1955 (age 71); Irvine, Ayrshire, Scotland
- Batting: Left-handed
- Bowling: Leg break

Domestic team information
- Years: Team
- 1975–1976: Oxford University

Career statistics
Competition	First-class
Matches	4
Runs scored	11
Batting average	1.83
100s/50s	–/–
Top score	5
Balls bowled	611
Wickets	7
Bowling average	50.00
5 wickets in innings	–
10 wickets in match	–
Best bowling	4/89
Catches/stumpings	3/–
- Source: Cricinfo, 4 June 2020

Donald John Wilkinson (born 14 February 1955) is a Scottish former first-class cricketer and educator. Wilkinson was born at Irvine in February 1955.

== Education ==
He was educated at the Lancaster Royal Grammar School and then graduated with a first class degree in history from Keble College, Oxford. While studying at Oxford, he played first-class cricket for Oxford University in 1975 and 1976, making four appearances. Playing as a leg break bowler, he took 7 wickets in his four matches, with best figures of 4 for 89.

== Career ==
After graduating from Oxford, Wilkinson had an extensive career in secondary education. He was appointed headteacher at Cheadle Hulme School (1990-2000) and St Christopher School, Letchworth (2004–06) before taking headmaster appointments overseas. He was also headmaster of Bearwood College prior to its closure in 2014.
