= Tibúrcio Spannocchi =

Tiburzio Spannocchi
- Born: 1541; Siena
- Died: 1609 (aged 67–68); Madrid
- Occupation: Military Engineer
- Known for: Chief engineer to Philip III of Spain

Tiburzio Spannocchi (1541–1609) (also Spanucchi, Spanochi, Spanoqui, Hispanochi etc.) was "king's engineer" to Philip II of Spain and subsequently to Philip III of Spain. He was named "Chief Engineer" in 1601.

== Origins ==
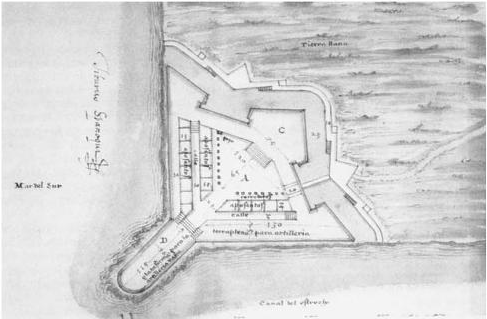
Drawing for a Fort at the Mouth of the Strait of Magellan by Tiburcio Spanoqui circa 1584

Tiburzio Spannocchi was an engineer from Siena. (Note: Another source says Tibúrcio Espannochi was originally from Naples.) He was born in 1541. He came from a noble Tuscan family, and served the Papal States in the fleet commanded by Marcantonio Colonna. In 1575 he was sent to Sicily as a Viceroy. Spannocchi entered the service of the King of Spain around 1580.

== Engineering works ==
Spannocchi became involved in a project to control the Strait of Magellan. Two forts were to be placed on either side of the start of the first narrows (Primera Angostura) on the Punta Anegada and Punta Delgada, creating an impregnable position. A chain could be slung between the two forts to prevent any ships from passing. Experts agreed that the bastions were extremely efficient in their design. However, the project was abandoned when it was realized that many ships would simply bypass the Strait by sailing round Cape Horn.

Spannocchi worked at Havana between 1586 and 1587, and may have worked at San Juan and Cartagena. In 1588 Spannocchi approved plans for the forts of El Morro and La Punta at Havana, Cuba as senior engineer to King Philip II. Philip II had commissioned the engineer Giovan Giacomo Paleari Fratino to strengthen the Fortifications of Gibraltar. Fratino proposed to destroy the work done on a wall started by his predecessor, Giovanni Battista Calvi, but Spannocchi refused to stop work on the zigzag wall, which was eventually finished in 1599, and is the upper portion of what is now called the Charles V Wall.

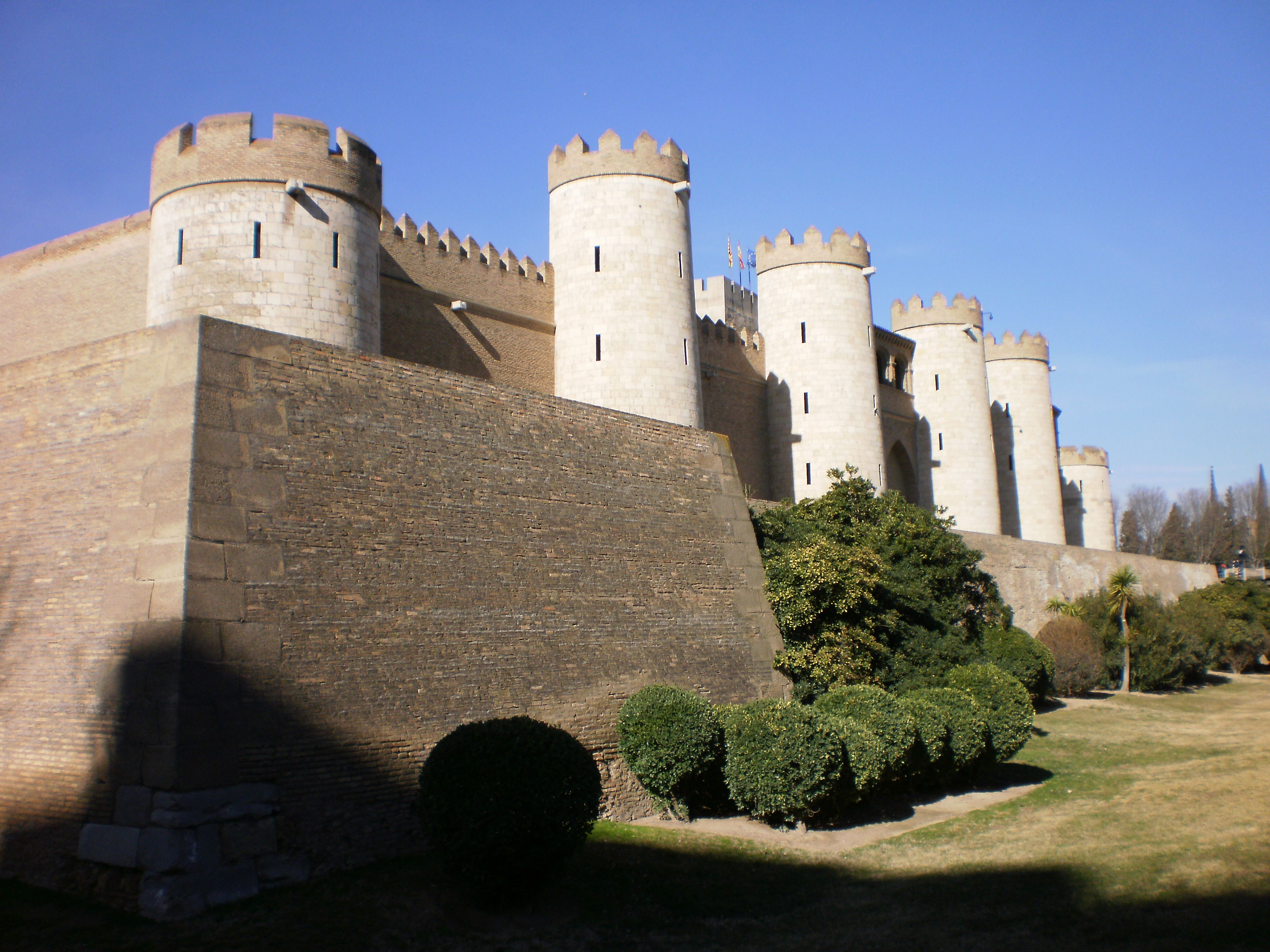
La Aljafería, Zaragoza

Spannocchi undertook various works on the citadel of Aljafería in Zaragoza for which Philip II himself had traced the drawing. Philip II gave him a commission to fortify the palace and transform it into a citadel. He executed the work in 1593, building the fortress of bricks and mortar with cornerstones, and surrounding it by a moat. The two doors were elaborately decorated. After these changes, the Aljafería was used as a military installation until the middle of the 20th century.

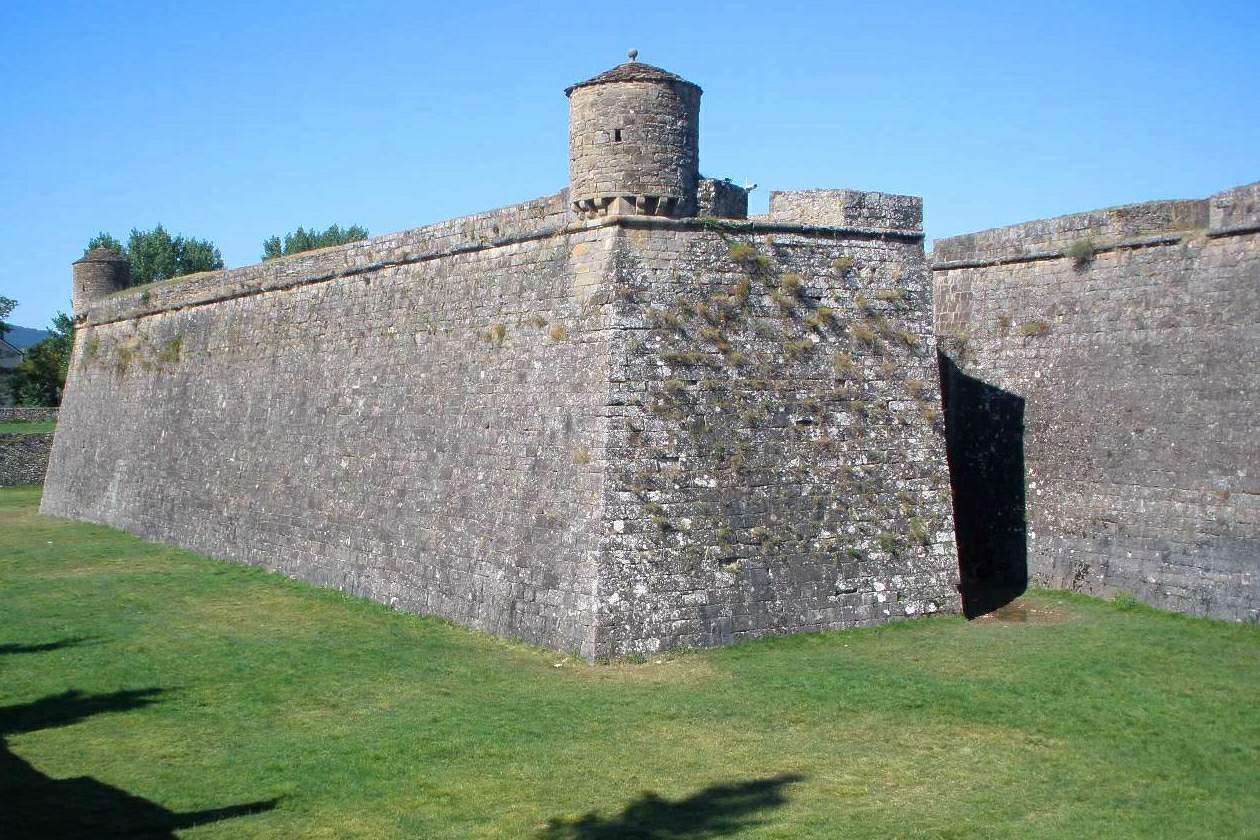
A wall of the Citadel of Jaca

Later Spannocchi's main energy went into mapping sites in the Pyrenees along the frontier between Spain and France, during a period of mounting tension between the two countries. The citadel of Jaca was built in the shape of a pentagon under his direction. In 1598 he advocated construction of a small fort to guard the entrance to the port of Pasaia, but planning did not start until 1620. At the start of the 17th century, Spannochi and Jerónimo de Soto were involved in construction of the palace of La Ventosilla in Burgos, including a supply of running water and other features that would contribute to greater comfort.

Spannocchi designed the nine-sided Fortaleza da Lage de São Francisco that defended Recife from the seas, and the Forte do Mar de São Marcelo that defended Salvador da Bahia. The plans for these two forts were sent to Brazil in May 1606. Tibúrcio Spannocchi died in 1609.

== Influence ==
In 1582 Spannocchi and Juan de Herrera founded the Department of Mathematical Military Architecture under the patronage of Philip II, an important school for training military engineers and architects. Jerónimo de Soto was one of Spannocchi's disciples. Another of his pupils was Cristóbal de Rojas, known for working as an assistant to Juan de Herrera in the construction of the monastery of El Escorial. Rojas worked as Spannocchi's deputy and became especially interested in military architecture, undertaking major works in Spain and North Africa. Rojas was the author of Teórica y práctica de la fortificación ("Theory and practice of fortification"), published in 1598, the first book on the science of fortification published in Spain. It was essentially a compendium of lessons from the Madrid Academy of Mathematics. The text highlights the influence of the Italian School's polygonal and radio-concentric theories.
