= Paul Hamlyn Foundation =

Registered charity and grant-making company

Paul Hamlyn Foundation is a registered charity, and a company limited by guarantee, which has been established in its current form since 2004, succeeding an earlier incarnation that was founded in 1987, which itself formalised established philanthropic giving by Paul Hamlyn that had been ongoing since 1972.

It is an independent grant-making foundation, making grants to individuals and organisations in the UK to help people overcome disadvantage. The foundation focuses on supporting children and young adults, especially in pursuit of the arts.

The Foundation is located in Kings Cross, London, with around 40 staff members. Trustees include James Lingwood (Chair), Jane Hamlyn, Michael Hamlyn, Marcus Davey, Martha Mackenzie and Akeela Ahmed.

== History ==
The Foundation was established by Paul Hamlyn, an entrepreneurial publisher and philanthropist. Born Paul Bertrand Wolfgang Hamburger in Berlin in 1926, he came to the UK as a migrant in 1933 to escape Nazi persecution.

== Current focuses ==
=== UK investment ===
The Paul Hamlyn Foundation works in the UK. The foundation set down six priorities in June 2015:

1. Helping imaginative people nurture great ideas;
2. Widening access to participation in the arts;
3. Education and learning in the arts;
4. Evidence gathering through the arts;
5. Supporting development and growth of organisations that invest in young people; and
6. Improving support for young people who migrate and those affected by migration.

=== Awards for Artists ===
Paul Hamlyn Foundation established Awards for Artists in 1994, supporting individuals to develop their creative ideas at a timely moment in their careers, with no strings attached. Ten awards of £75,000 each are made annually; five to visual artists and five to composers. Previous recipients have included Yinka Shonibare, Phyllida Barlow, Eliza Carthy and Jeremy Deller.

In 2020, due to the Impact of the 2019–20 coronavirus pandemic on the arts and cultural heritage, the foundation announced that the usual competitive selection process for the program would be removed, and that instead each of the more than 100 previously nominated eligible applicants would automatically receive £10,000.

=== India ===
Paul Hamlyn Foundation has been working in India since 1992 and has been able to provide support for 200 projects. The Foundation’s three main aims for investment in India are to enable vulnerable communities living in priority geographical areas to improve their lives; to enable especially vulnerable people living anywhere in India to improve their lives; and to develop the capacity of organisations and people who facilitate the above aims.
