= St. Jago's Cemetery =

Graveyard in Gibraltar

- Interactive map of St. Jago's Cemetery

Details
- Location: Gibraltar
- Coordinates: 36.1353°N 5.3522°W

St. Jago's Cemetery was a cemetery in the British Overseas Territory of Gibraltar. Also known as Deadman's Cemetery, it was positioned just north of the Charles V Wall. The burial ground was initially used for the poor Spaniards of La Turba; following the 1704 capture of Gibraltar, it was utilised as a Protestant cemetery. In 1929, the burial ground was incorporated into the St. Jago's Barracks recreational facilities. Three years later, some of the remaining headstones were transferred to Trafalgar Cemetery. Little evidence of the former cemetery remains. It is notable as the earliest cemetery in Gibraltar as well as the only one within the city limits.

== Early history ==
St. Jago's Cemetery was located in Gibraltar, the British Overseas Territory at the southern end of the Iberian Peninsula. The burial ground was positioned just north of the Charles V Wall. It extended from the defensive wall to what is now AquaGib Limited, the water supply company that was formerly Lyonnaise des Eaux (Gibraltar). Also referred to as Deadman's Cemetery, St. Jago's may represent the oldest cemetery in Gibraltar. In addition, the cemetery is notable as the only one within the walls of the city of Gibraltar.

The cemetery is believed to have been the location of an older burial ground for those impoverished Spaniards who once lived in the La Turba district. After the capture of Gibraltar from the Spanish in 1704, St. Jago's was later used as a Protestant cemetery for both civilians and the military. However, Roman Catholics were often interred in a pit in their church, with lime to promote decomposition.

== More recent history ==
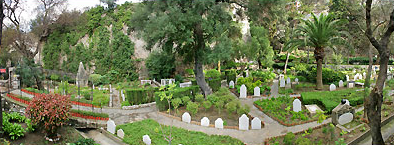
Trafalgar Cemetery, south of Charles V Wall, was sometimes considered to be part of St. Jago's Cemetery.

The Trafalgar Cemetery, just south of the Charles V Wall and near the Southport Gates, was consecrated in the late eighteenth century, and utilised for interments from 1798 to 1814. It was formerly referred to as the Southport Ditch Cemetery, as it was established at the location of the Southport Ditch, which had constituted part of the southern defences of the city of Gibraltar. Trafalgar Cemetery was sometimes considered to be part of St. Jago's Cemetery.

In 1932, more than a century after Trafalgar Cemetery fell into disuse, tombstones from St. Jago's Cemetery were mounted on the eastern wall of Trafalgar Cemetery. The oldest gravestone in the wall dates to 1738. The transfer of the tombstones from one burial ground to the other was done on the order of General Sir Alexander Godley, who was Governor of Gibraltar from 1928 to 1933. St. Jago's Cemetery had been incorporated into St. Jago's Barracks playground in 1929. The burial ground was repurposed into a rifle range and "ball alley." There is now little evidence of the former cemetery.
