= Afonso Álvares =

Master of Works for the Portuguese king

Afonso Álvares (also spelled Affonso Álvares) was the Master of Works for the Portuguese king, Sebastian of Portugal, and he designed, amongst other structures, the Monastery of São Bento in Lisbon in 1571, which was lost in the 1755 Lisbon earthquake, and is now partially the site of the Portuguese Parliament. He also designed the Fort of Santiago do Outão in 1572.

== Work ==
He was the author of the design of the Leiria cathedral, built between 1551 and 1574 (this temple follows the typology drawn by Miguel de Arruda, father-in-law of Afonso Álvares, for the new cathedrals built during the reign of King João III) and possibly the cathedral of Portalegre, begun in 1556.

He was the architect of the Church of São Salvador de Veiros, in Veiros, in the municipality of Estremoz, erected by the Order of Avis, under license from Cardinal D. Henrique, in 1559.

He held the post of "master of the works of fortifications", and was responsible for the works of modernization and expansion of the Fort of Santiago do Outão in the bar of the river Sado, in Setúbal (1572). The architectural innovations focused on the construction of a bulwark and a terrace, where cannons could be installed.

Between 1571 and 1580, he succeeded Francisco de Arruda in directing the second stage of the Amoreira Aqueduct works in Elvas.

At the end of the century he made the layout of the Monastery of S. Bento da Saúde.

He was also the author of the project to enlarge the Church of São Roque in Lisbon, which would evolve into the Mannerist style. Afonso Álvares accompanied the work from 1566 until 1575, when he was replaced by his possible nephew, Baltazar Álvares. Under his guidance a single-nave church was conceived, a project favored by Cardinal Dom Henrique.

== Sources ==
- O Recreio Nº 2, Lisbon Imprensa Nacional, February 1839, by Luiz Duarte Villela da Silva
