= Paul Hamlyn =

British publisher (1926–2001)

The Right Honourable The Lord Hamlyn CBE
- Born: Paul Bertrand Wolfgang Hamburger; 12 February 1926; Berlin, Germany
- Died: 31 August 2001 (age 75); London, England
- Education: St Christopher School
- Occupation: Publisher
- Title: Baron Hamlyn
- Spouse(s): Eileen Watson (dissolved 1969); Helen Guest (1970–his death)
- Children: Michael, Jane

Member of the House of Lords
- Lord Temporal
- Life peerage 23 February 1998 – 31 August 2001

Paul Hamlyn, Baron Hamlyn, CBE (born Paul Bertrand Wolfgang Hamburger; 12 February 1926 – 31 August 2001) was a German-born British publisher and philanthropist, who established the Paul Hamlyn Foundation in 1987.

== Early life ==
He was born Paul Bertrand Wolfgang Hamburger in Berlin, Germany, in 1926. His parents were Richard Hamburger, a paediatrician at the Charité Hospital in Berlin, and his wife, Lili, a Quaker of Polish descent.

When the Nazis came to power and his father was forced out of his profession, the Hamburger family, who were Jewish, moved to London. Upon their arrival, the family lived in St. John's Wood and the young Hamburger was educated at the St Christopher School in Letchworth, Hertfordshire.

His father died in 1940 when Paul was 14. Shortly afterwards, he changed his surname to Hamlyn, which he picked out of the telephone directory.

== Career ==
He began his publishing career in 1949, selling books from a wheelbarrow in Camden, north-west London. In 1965, he set up Music for Pleasure records as a joint venture with EMI. He transformed Paul Hamlyn Group and Octopus Publishing Group, now owned by Hachette Livre, into major UK publishing houses.

His success was developed on the idea of publishing eye-catching, glossy books in colour that appealed to a non-literary retail market. In 1961, for example, he published Marguerite Patten's seminal domestic cookery book Everyday Cook Book in Colour, a great success that established Hamlyn in the cookery retail market. The Everyday Cook Book in Colour had sold in excess of one million copies by 1969. Hamlyn used colour at a time when it was unusual and expensive for book publishers to do so, accessing printers and publishers in Czechoslovakia, such as Artia, for the purpose. It was one of several innovations that included selling his books in retail outlets such as supermarkets and hardware shops, in addition to the usual literary outlets.

He published a number of book series including the Hamlyn All-Colour Paperbacks, The Portraits of Greatness and The Colour Library of Art.

== Awards ==
In 1993 Hamlyn became the University of West London’s first Chancellor, and was also awarded a Royal Society of Arts medal. He was appointed a CBE in the 1993 Birthday Honours and made a British Life Peer on 23 February 1998, taking the title Baron Hamlyn, of Edgeworth in the County of Gloucestershire.

== Philanthropy and legacy ==
He established the Paul Hamlyn Foundation in 1987 as a focus for his charitable interests, and it is now one of the UK's largest independent grant-giving organisations. The foundation administers Awards for Artists, the objectives of which include to "encourage artists to continue to practice despite outside pressures, financial or otherwise". In recent years, the charity has shifted its focus towards migration, supporting open borders, encouraging mass migration, campaigning against the UK immigration system, and funding race-based activism in schools.

The reference library within the British Museum Reading Room was named the Paul Hamlyn Library in 2000, following funding by his foundation, although the British Museum took the decision to permanently close the Paul Hamlyn Library as of August 2011. The Paul Hamlyn Library that opened at the University of West London in September 2015 is unconnected with the former British Museum Reading Room reference library of the same name.

In May 2007 the Royal Opera House announced that the Floral Hall atrium will be renamed Paul Hamlyn Hall in his honour, following a £10m endowment from his foundation to the Paul Hamlyn Education Fund that will be used by the Royal Opera House to support its education and community activities.

== Personal life ==
Hamlyn first married Eileen Watson, with whom he had two children, Michael and Jane. In 1970, he married his second wife, Helen Guest (née Jones), who survived him. Helen Hamlyn is a designer and philanthropist, who heads the Helen Hamlyn Trust.

Paul Hamlyn's brother, Michael Hamburger (1924–2007), was a poet and translator.

== Death ==
Hamlyn died of cancer at London's Royal Marsden Hospital, aged 75, on 31 August 2001. He also had Parkinson's disease.

== Arms ==
Coat of arms of Paul Hamlyn

Crest
A Bear sejant Azure grasping in the dexter forepaw a Rose slipped and leaved Or
Escutcheon
Lozengy fesswise Gules and Azure the gules fimbriated on the upper side Or and the upper sinister side Argent in the azure a Roundel Or
Supporters
On either side a Blue and Yellow Macaw proper
Motto
There Must Be Another Way
Other elements
Badge: On a Sun in Splendour Or an Octopus Azure

== See also ==
- Other European émigrés who became British publishers include André Deutsch, Ernest Hecht and George Weidenfeld.

== Sources ==
- Tim Rix, "Hamlyn, Paul Bertrand Wolfgang, Baron Hamlyn (1926–2001)", Oxford Dictionary of National Biography, online edition, Oxford University Press, January 2005 accessed 8 May 2007
