= Rolf Landsberg =

German chemist (1920–2003)

- Born: Rolf Landsberg; February 28, 1920; Berlin, Germany
- Died: December 27, 2003; Berlin, Germany
- Occupations: Academic (Physical Chemistry); University Rector (Leuna-Merseburg)
- Political party: SED
- Spouse: Ingeborg Landsberg (1928-2001)
- Children: Irene Zierke; Lutz Landsberg; Sonja Drachholtz
- Parent(s): Max Landsberg (1878-1930); Hedwig Hamburger/Landsberg (1888–1956)

Rolf Landsberg (February 28, 1920 – December 27, 2003) was a German Professor of Physical Chemistry.

Between 1961/2 and 1964 he served as rector of the Leuna-Merseburg "Carl Schorlemmer" Academy for Chemistry (near Leipzig).

== Life ==
Rolf Landsberg was the elder of two sons born to the architect Max Landsberg and his wife, the doctor Hedwig Landsberg. Theirs was a prosperous Berlin family. However, Max Landsberg, who had been diagnosed with epilepsy in 1890, died young, in 1930. Rolf began his schooling in Berlin, starting his secondary education at the Heinrich-Kleist-Gymnasium. However, in January 1933 there had been a change of government, and it became increasingly apparent that antisemitism, which had been a prominent feature of Nazi rhetoric in opposition, was entering the political mainstream. The Landsbergs were Jewish. In 1934 Rolf Landsberg was sent to school in England, where he attended the progressive St Christopher School in Letchworth, to the north of London between 1934 and 1937. Sources differ as to whether his mother and brother accompanied him to England at this stage, but by 1939 all three had emigrated to Britain. He went on to study at University College London, emerging with a Chemistry degree (Bachelor of Science) in 1940. In Britain he later also studied at Aberystwyth, but his academic progress was not uninterrupted.

In 1939 Germany invaded Poland and Britain declared war on Germany. At home the British government responded to these developments by identifying as enemy aliens large numbers of Jewish and political refugees who had arrived from Nazi Germany. Landsberg's mother was able to escape to Brazil where she joined her brother who, in 1936, had also fled Germany. Rolf and his brother were both arrested by the British government in 1940, and while his younger brother was interned on the Isle of Man, Rolf was sent to Canada for his internment. In Canada he became associated with the (exiled) German Communist Party. Two years later the political mood had changed and he was returned to Britain where he played an active part in the struggle against Fascism in Europe, and became a co-founder of an exiled London based version of the anti-Nazi Free German Youth (FDJ / Freie Deutsche Jugend) movement. In 1944 he volunteered as an assistant to the British army, with which he worked for the next three years, notably as a simultaneous translator, until September 1947. Postings included Münster and Bielefeld.

Towards the end of 1947 Rolf Landsberg relocated full-time to Germany where he obtained a post as an assistant in the Physical Chemistry Institute at the Humboldt University of Berlin, which was in the Soviet occupation zone of what remained of Germany. The division of Berlin seemed at this stage neither so politically absolute nor so physically rigid as it later became, but the basis for a return to one-party government had already been set in place in April 1946 with the contentious merger between the old Communist Party and the Moderate-left SPD. Landsberg joined the newly formed Socialist Unity Party (Sozialistische Einheitspartei Deutschlands, SED) in 1947, and by 1949, when the Soviet controlled part of Germany was re-founded as the German Democratic Republic, sponsored by and in many respects politically modeled on the Soviet Union, Landsberg was a citizen of the new country, while his younger brother Peter pursued an academic career in England.

After three years, in 1950, Ralf Landsberg received his doctorate from the Humboldt for a dissertation supervised by Karl Friedrich Bonhoeffer and entitled "Potentials in the creation of precipitate membranes" The next step in his career involved a move, in 1952, to the Ernst Moritz Arndt University (Greifswald), in the north-east of the country, where he lectured on physical chemistry. This was followed by a longer stint, starting in 1955, in the south, as a lecturer at the Leuna-Merseburg "Carl Schorlemmer" Academy for Chemistry. It was at Leuna-Merseburg that he received his Habilitation (a higher academic distinction) in 1958/59. On this occasion his dissertation was entitled "On the kinetics of concealed processes with nickel and zinc anodes" In 1959 he became a professor at the same institution. Then, in January 1962, Rolf Landsberg was appointed Rector of the Leuna-Merseburg "Carl Schorlemmer" Academy for Chemistry in succession to Elmar Profft. Profft himself had been released from the post after less than a year after making known political and ideological differences with The Party over matters including, notably, the Berlin Wall erected suddenly in August 1961.

Just two years later, in 1964, he returned to the Humboldt University of Berlin, accepting the chair for Physical Chemistry, also becoming Director of the Humboldt's Physical Chemistry Institute. His predecessor's academic career (followed a few months later by his party membership) had been abruptly terminated following a series of lectures in 1963/64 which had been interpreted as a call to remove political dogma from science teaching. In this instance Landsberg's dissident predecessor was Robert Havemann who subsequently gained prominence in various sources on account of the persecution he suffered at the hands of the East German authorities.

A particular focus of Landsberg's career in terms of research involved surfaces. That is what he now concentrated on at the Humboldt Physical Chemistry Institute until his retirement in 1985. His many years of teaching in the field of electro-chemistry were crystallised in the book "Electro-chemical Reactions and Processes" (1977).

He continued to play an active role in scientific life after his retirement, and was a board member of the Leibniz Society in Berlin which he had joined in 1993. He was also a member of the German Academy of Sciences.

== Awards and honours ==
*Patriotic Order of Merit
