= Cristóbal de Rojas =

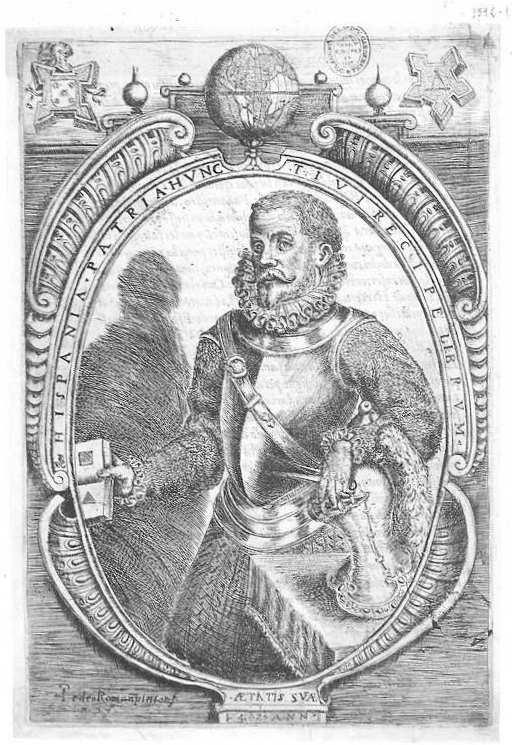
- Born: 1555; Baeza, Spain
- Died: 1614 (aged 58–59); Cádiz, Spain
- Occupations: Architect and Military Engineer
- Known for: Fortifications of Cádiz

Cristóbal de Rojas (1555–1614) was a Spanish military engineer and architect. He is known for working as an assistant to Juan de Herrera in the construction of the monastery of El Escorial.

== Biography ==
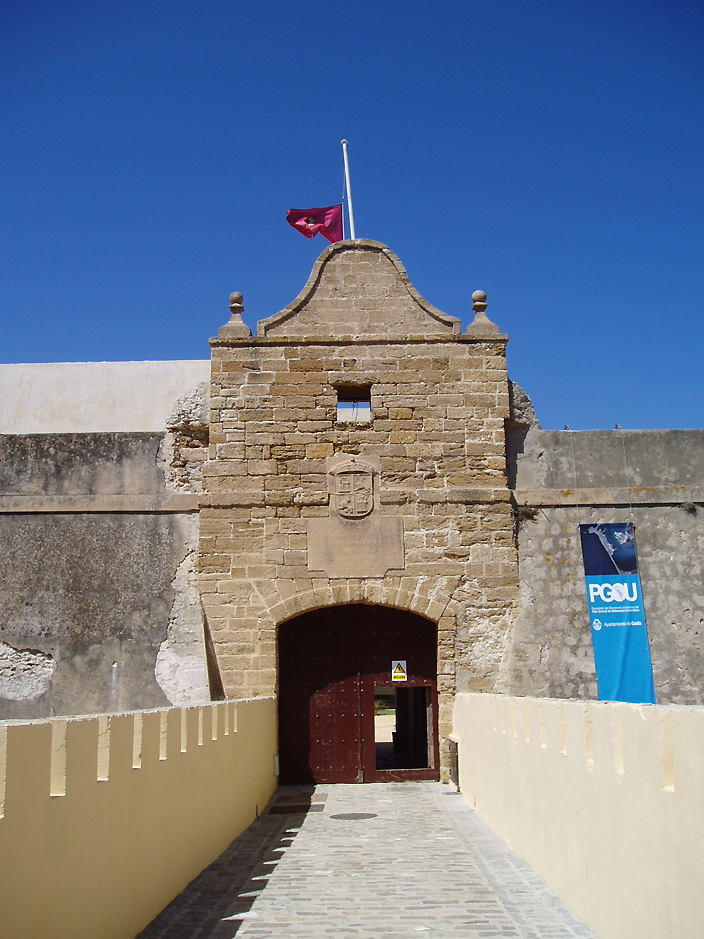
Castillo de Santa Catalina in Cádiz

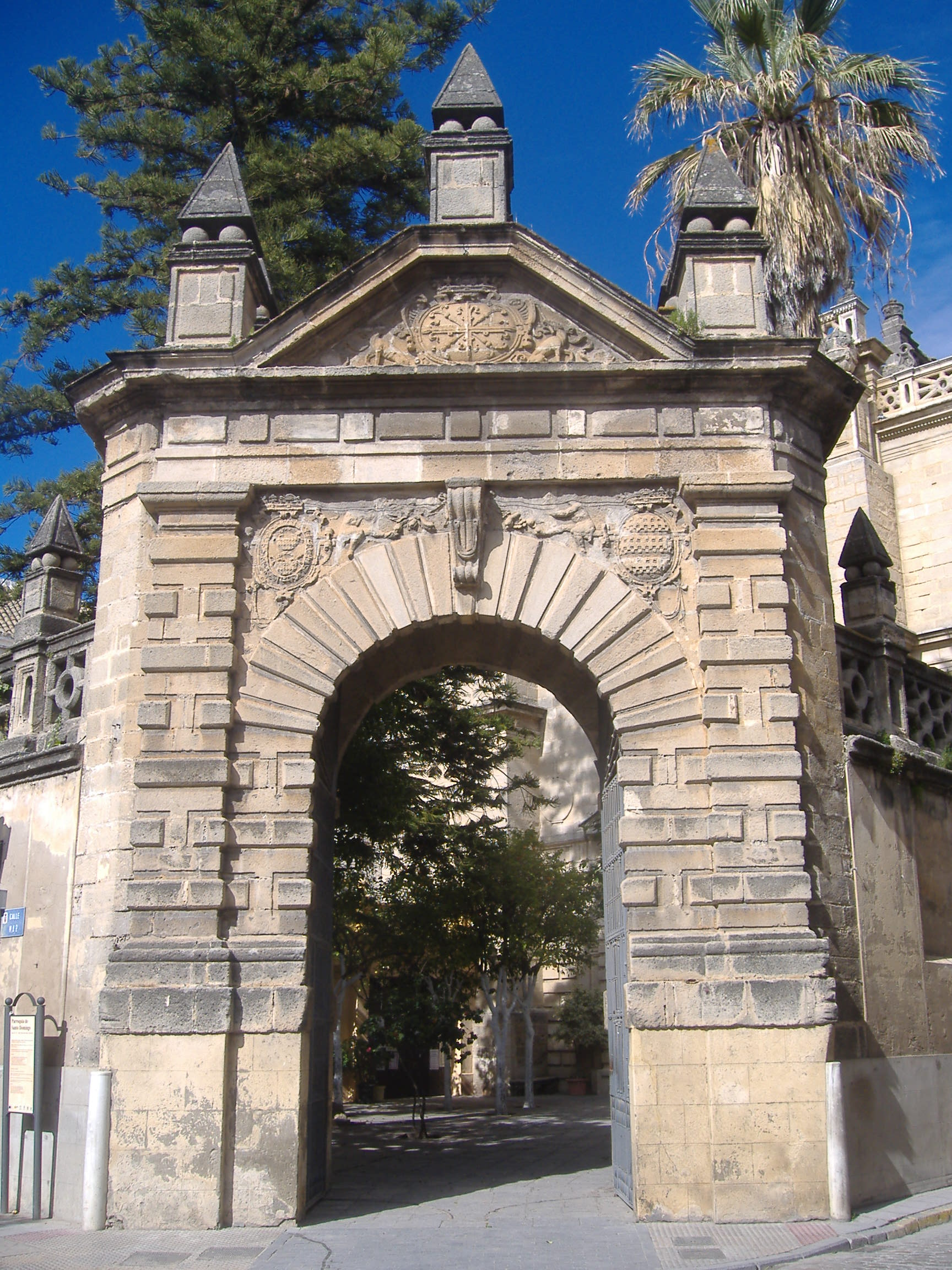
Sanlúcar de Barrameda - Church of Santo Domingo. Portada compás

Cristóbal de Rojas was born in Baeza in 1555. He was in Seville in 1586, where he acquired a considerable reputation as an architect. His best known work in this city is the Tabernacle Church, which he designed. The project was later begun by Alonso de Vandelvira and Miguel de Zumárraga in the year 1615, and construction was done between 1618 and 1662, while basically following the originally approved plan.

Rojas became a pupil of the king's engineer Tibúrcio Spannocchi, and became especially interested in military architecture. In 1586, he helped to review the fortifications of Gibraltar and Cádiz. After that he become very active as a military engineer, designing and building forts in Spanish territories during the Brittany Campaign, including in North Africa. In 1597 he finished his treatise on "Theory and Practice of Fortification", the first of its kind to be published in Spain. The text highlights the influence of the Italian School's polygonal and radio-concentric theories.

Rojas undertook important works in Sanlúcar de Barrameda including the famous carved stone facada of the Santo Domingo Church in this city, in the mannerist style, started in 1596 and completed ten years later. In his capacity as military architect and engineer he was appointed to rebuild and fortify the city of Cádiz after it had suffered a violent Anglo-Dutch assault and looting in 1596. He rebuilt the old Church of Santa Cruz, ruined as a result of the looting. De Rojas designed and built the fort of Fort San Felipe on La Mamora, a Spanish possession in northern Morocco during much of the seventeenth century.

Rojas's most important work was the overall fortification of the city of Cádiz, the most ambitious military work in the country during the reigns of Philip II of Spain and Philip III of Spain, including important elements such as the castle of Santa Catalina, started in 1598. After his death in Cádiz in 1614, the fortifications of the city were continued by the military engineer Ignacio de Sala.
