= Fort of São Filipe de Setúbal =

- Forte de São Filipe de Setúbal
- Setúbal, Setúbal District, Lisbon Region in Portugal
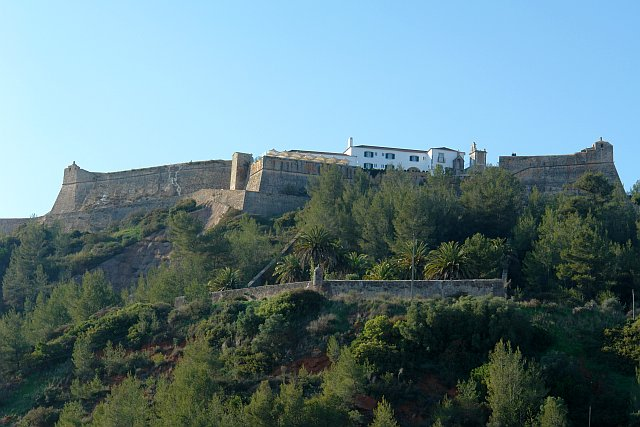
- Distant view of the fort

Site information
- Type: Fort
- Owner: Portuguese Republic
- Open to the public: Yes

Location
- Coordinates: 38°31′05″N 8°54′34″W

Site history
- Built: 1577
- Built by: King Sebastian I
- Fate: Preserved

The Fort of São Filipe de Setúbal, also referred to as the São Filipe Castle or the São Filipe Fortress, is in the city of Setúbal in the Setúbal District, of Portugal. The fort was built on the orders of Philip II of Spain (Philip I of Portugal), who personally witnessed the laying of the cornerstone of the new fortification in 1582. It stands in a dominant position on the right bank of the mouth of the Sado River, overlooking the centre of Setúbal to its east and guarding access to the river. Named after the king during the Iberian Union, the fortress was designed by Giovan Giacomo Paleari Fratino and had the Italian military engineer Filipe Terzi, who worked for the Spanish Royal Court, as its chief engineer. It was completed in 1600 under the guidance of Leonardo Torreano due to the death of Terzi.

== History ==
The fortification of the stretch of coastline around Setúbal dates back to the 14th century, with the construction at sea level of the Fort of Santiago do Outão, which was intended to control the Sado river access to the medieval village. During the reign of King John III in the first half of the 16th century there were plans to expand Setubal’s defences with the construction of a castle, but the financial difficulties faced at that time by the Crown made this impossible.

At the time of the Philippine Dynasty (1580-1640), Philip II of Spain ordered the construction of a new fortification on a hill adjacent to the city, to reinforce the defence of Setúbal. Recent scholars, however, have argued that the intention of the fort was also to protect a garrison loyal to the Philippine Dynasty and provide a clear indication of the Spanish king’s power, as the people of Setúbal had shown considerable opposition to Spanish rule. It was designed by Giovan Giacomo Paleari Fratino in 1583. Work on the fortress began in 1590 and was completed in 1600. During the Portuguese Restoration War the fort was the last part of Setúbal to fall to the Portuguese. Between 1649 and 1655 a “low battery” was added to provide additional defence against ships in the port.

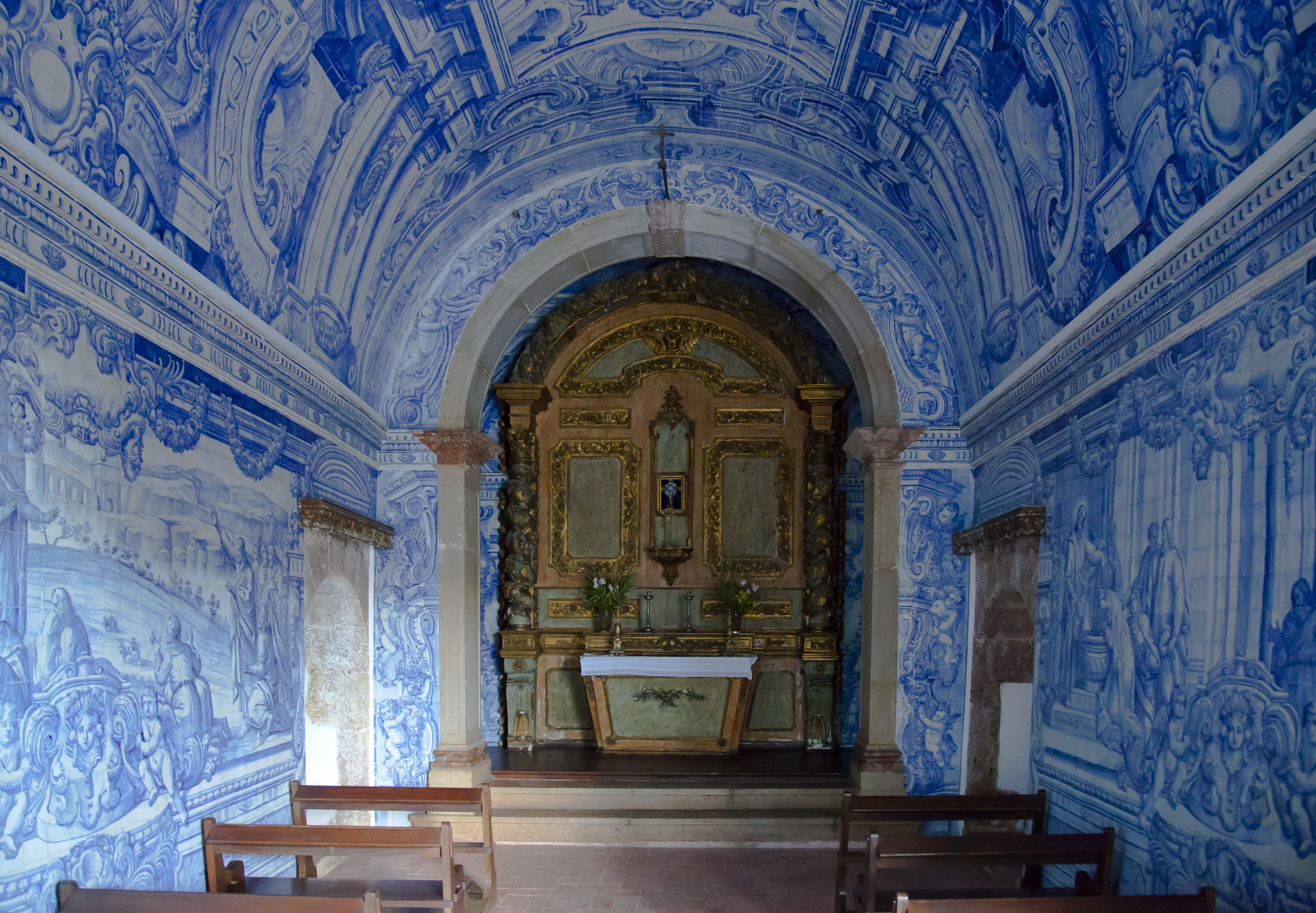
The chapel

The fort was damaged during the 1755 earthquake and the Command House, then the residence of the Governor of Setúbal, was destroyed by fire in the mid-19th century. It was classified as a National Monument in 1933 and was included in the Nature Park of Arrábida when that was established in 1976. Conservation work was undertaken in the 1940s and in 1962 parts were converted to a hotel, which opened in 1965 as part of the Pousadas de Portugal chain. Some damage occurred as a result of an earthquake in February, 1969. Repairs and further conservation work have been carried out since then but the hotel closed in 2014 due to problems of structural instability. The fort was reopened to the public on 31 March 2017, under the management of the city council, with an information centre and restaurant.

== Characteristics ==
The Fort of São Filipe de Setúbal is said to have been inspired by the Castel Sant'Elmo of Naples. It features an irregular polygonal floor plan that is adapted to the ground’s contours. There are six tall, sloping ramparts and six bastions. It has excellent visibility over the surrounding area and the Sado estuary. The fortress buildings are on an upper platform, and there is also a small baroque chapel with azulejo tiles showing scenes from the life of Saint Philip.
