= Fort of Santiago do Outão =

Fortress in Setúbal, Portugal

- Forte de Santiago do Outão
- Setubal, Setubal District, Lisboa Region in Portugal
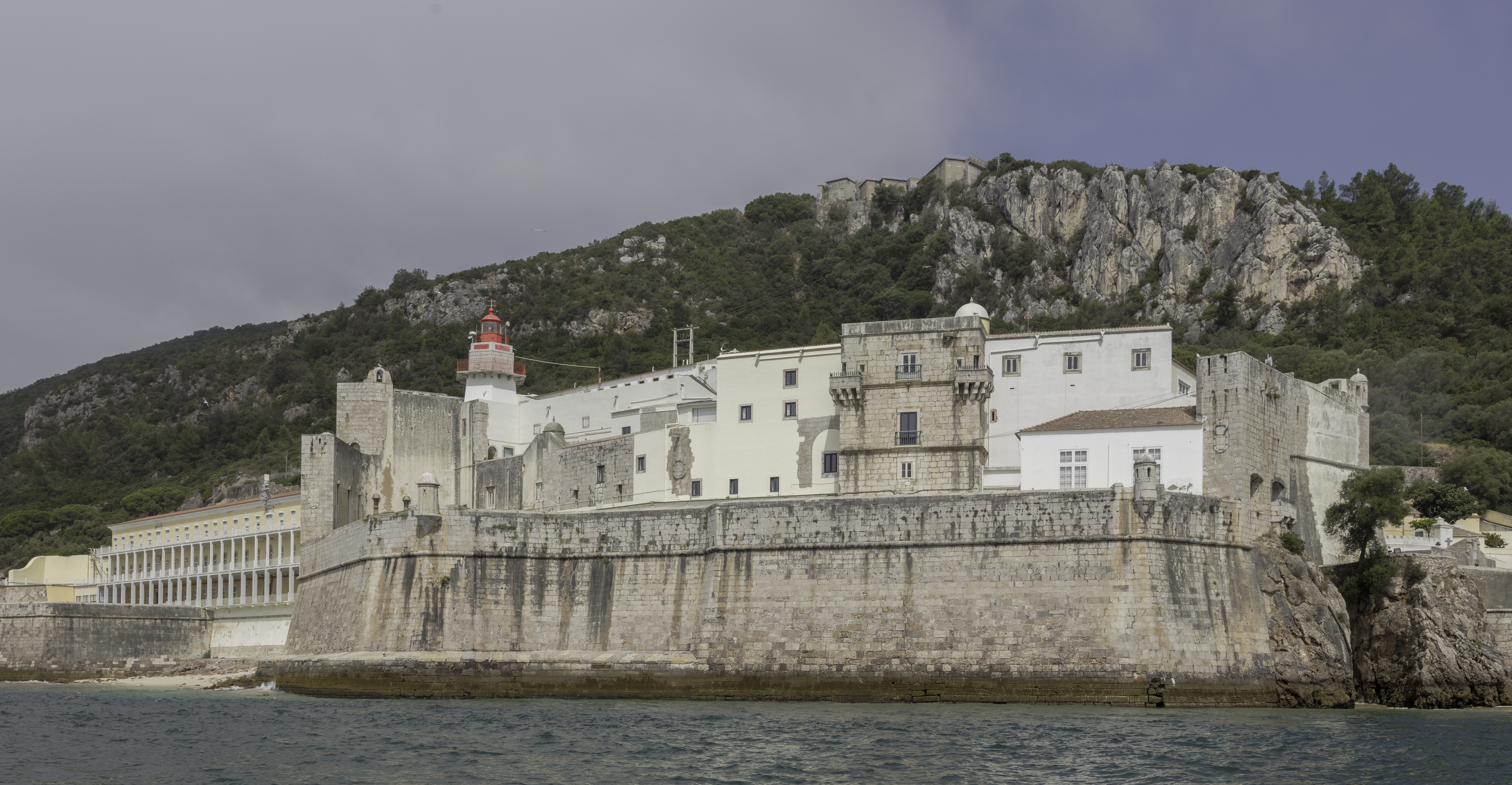
- The south side of the fort and lighthouse

Site information
- Type: Fort
- Owner: Portuguese Republic
- Open to the public: Yes

Location
- Coordinates: 38°29′19″N 8°56′03″W

Site history
- Built: c. 1572

The Fort of Santiago do Outão is a former coastal military installation in Setúbal, Portugal that is currently the site of the Hospital Ortopédico Sant'Iago do Outão. The fort is located on the Costa Azul at the northern side of the Sado River's mouth.

== History ==
The oldest identified structure at Outão is a lighthouse and watchtower at the mouth of the Sado River that was erected by João I in 1390. In 1572, during the reign of Sebastião I, the watchtower underwent a major expansion and was surrounded by fortified walls and transformed into a fortress by Afonso Álvares. The fort withstood a siege by the Duke of Alba during the Portuguese succession crisis of 1580.

Santiago do Outão remained loyal to Philip III until December 8, 1640, during the Portuguese Restoration War. The fort underwent a remodeling during the reign of João IV beginning in 1643 in order to provide better defenses at the entrance to Setúbal's port. The fort's reconstruction was completed by 1657.

In the 19th century, the fort was decommissioned and transformed into a prison. By 1890, Santiago do Outão was again transformed, this time into a summer palace for Carlos I. From 1900 until 1909, the fort was utilized as a sanatorium for the treatment of tuberculosis. Finally, the compound was converted into the Hospital Ortopédico Sant'Iago do Outão in 1909 which it remains as to the present day.

== See also ==
- Fort of São Filipe de Setúbal
