= St Christopher School =

School in Letchworth Garden City, Hertfordshire, England

Coordinates: 51°58′05″N 0°13′36″W

Location
- Barrington Road; Letchworth Garden City, Hertfordshire, SG6 3JZ; England

Information
- Type: Independent day and boarding
- Motto: The utmost for the highest
- Established: 1915
- Head: Rich Jones
- Gender: Co-educational
- Age: 3 to 18
- Houses: Gernon, Godwin, Lytton
- Colours: Yellow, red and blue
- Website: http://www.stchris.co.uk/

St Christopher School is a private day and boarding school in Letchworth Garden City, Hertfordshire, England.

Established in 1915 as the Garden City Theosophical School, it has long been a flagship of progressive education. The present name was adopted in 1919.

== Character ==
The school is co-educational, taking both day and boarding pupils between the ages of three and eighteen. It has a Montessori School, a Junior School, and a Senior School, with a sixth form.

There is no uniform, and all in the school are called by their first names.

== History ==
The origins of the school lie in Theosophy, and some seeds were sown in a lecture by George Arundale on 26 December 1912 at a Theosophical Society Adyar convention in Adyar, Madras State, British India. The subject was "Education as Service", and Arundale referred to a book with that title by Jiddu Krishnamurti. A group of those present then wrote to the Theosophical Society in England, asking for a school on Theosophical lines to be established. Fund-raising began in 1913, and the project was supported by Arundale, Annie Besant, and Josephine Ransom.

Letchworth was chosen as the site of the school, as it had a flourishing theosophical community. Two houses were bought, 28 and 30 Broadwater Avenue, and the Garden City Theosophical School opened on 20 January 1915, with Dr John Horace Armstrong Smith, a theosophical physician, as head, and with fourteen children enrolled. By the autumn term, the number had risen to 41.

The school soon took over some buildings on Barrington Road, built in 1909 for a short-lived school called Letchworth School. In 1919, a new building was built at the junction of Spring Road and Broadway, and the school adopted its current name. The Barrington Road site was then used for boarders.

The school's early years were much influenced by Krishnamurti's book. Key principles from the outset were vegetarianism, physical health achieved through exercise, a belief in the benefits of beautiful surroundings, and racial toleration. Exam results were to be "a private matter between teacher and pupil".

By 1918, all children were members of a pupil forum called the Moot, which greatly influenced the running of the school.

In 1920, the Theosophical Educational Trust bought a lease of the historic Rectory of Letchworth, to which children were moved from Brackenhill Home School, in Kent, another of the trust's foundations. It later became a house of the St Christopher School called Arunwood and is now used by the Montessori department. The Rectory was one of the childhood homes of Laurence Olivier, whose father was Rector.

In 1928, the school was consolidated onto the Barrington Road site.

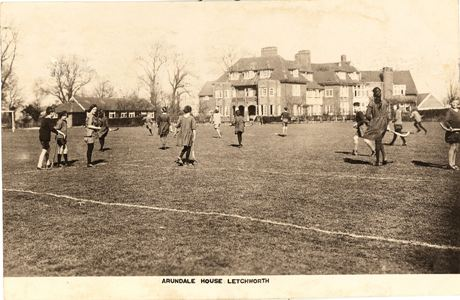
Hockey at Arundale House, 1924

From 1925 to 1953, Lyn Harris and his wife Eleanor Harris were joint heads of the school. They were followed by Nicholas King-Harris, in post from 1954 to 1980.

In 1934, the school's former buildings on Broadway were sold to the Sisters of Charity of Jesus and Mary to become the Middle School Building, theatre, and gymnasium of the new St Francis' College, Letchworth.

St Chris Alumni

‘New’ Old Scholars alumni has been set up by Rich Jones on 17th.September 2026

www.stchris.co.uk/alumni

== Allegations of abuse ==
On the 9th March 2026, the Daily Telegraph published an article entitled “The dark secret at the heart of Britain's most liberal boarding school”.

This article described the findings of a seven-month investigation by the Telegraph, in the course of which the newspaper had spoken to former students who were at the school from the 1960s to the 1990s. Former pupils alleged that they had endured “disturbing sexual, psychological and physical abuse”. The Telegraph followed up their article with a further six articles about St Christopher. The police have now opened an investigation into the school, entitled “Operation Fashion”. In addition, Malcolm Johnson, a solicitor at Lime Solicitors is bringing a series of civil claims for compensation against St Christopher. The headmaster of St Christopher has said “We are desperately sorry to learn of these profoundly distressing and shocking allegations” and “Our focus now is on supporting former pupils who have spoken about their past experiences and on ensuring the school remains a safe and nurturing environment for every child today.”

== Heads ==
- 1915–1918: Dr J. H. Armstrong Smith
- 1919–1925: Beatrice Ensor and Isabel King
- 1925–1953: Lyn and Eleanor Harris
- 1954–1980: Nicholas King-Harris
- 1981–2004: Colin Reid
- 2004–2006: Donald Wilkinson
- 2006–2020: Richard Palmer
- 2020–2022: Emma-Kate Henry
- 2023–Present: Rich Jones

== Notable staff ==
- Ernest Elmore (1901–1957), sports and drama master
- Dame Mary Marsh (born 1946), deputy head in 1990s

== Notable former pupils ==
- Ed Asafu-Adjaye (born 1988), footballer
- Rufus Keppel, 10th Earl of Albemarle (born 1965), designer
- Philip Barton (born 1963), Former Permanent Under Secretary of Foreign and Development Office
- Catherine Bearder (born 1949), politician
- Peter Blegvad (born 1951), musician
- Gavin Campbell (born 1946), actor and presenter
- Neil Coles (born 1934), professional golfer
- Jacqui Dankworth (born 1963), singer
- Julia Darling (1956–2005), author
- Jenny Diski (1947–2016), author
- JJ Feild (born 1978), actor
- Sonia Friedman (born 1965), theatre producer
- A. A. Gill (1954–2016), journalist
- Connie Glynn (born 1994), author
- Paul Hamlyn (1926–2001), publisher
- David Horovitch (born 1945), actor
- Stephen Howarth (born 1981), poet, artist, and actor
- Elizabeth Jenkins (1905–2010), writer
- George Lamb, broadcaster
- Rolf Landsberg (1920–2003), physicist and University Rector
- Prince Rupert Loewenstein (1933–2014), manager of The Rolling Stones
- Olly Mann, comedian and writer
- Anthony Moore (born 1948), musician and composer
- Roger Phillips (1932–2021), photographer
- Freya Ridings (born 1994), singer, songwriter
- Shawn Slovo (born 1950), writer
- Richard Walker (1918–1985), angler
- Michael Winner (1935–2013), film producer and director
