= Daniel Specklin =

French architect

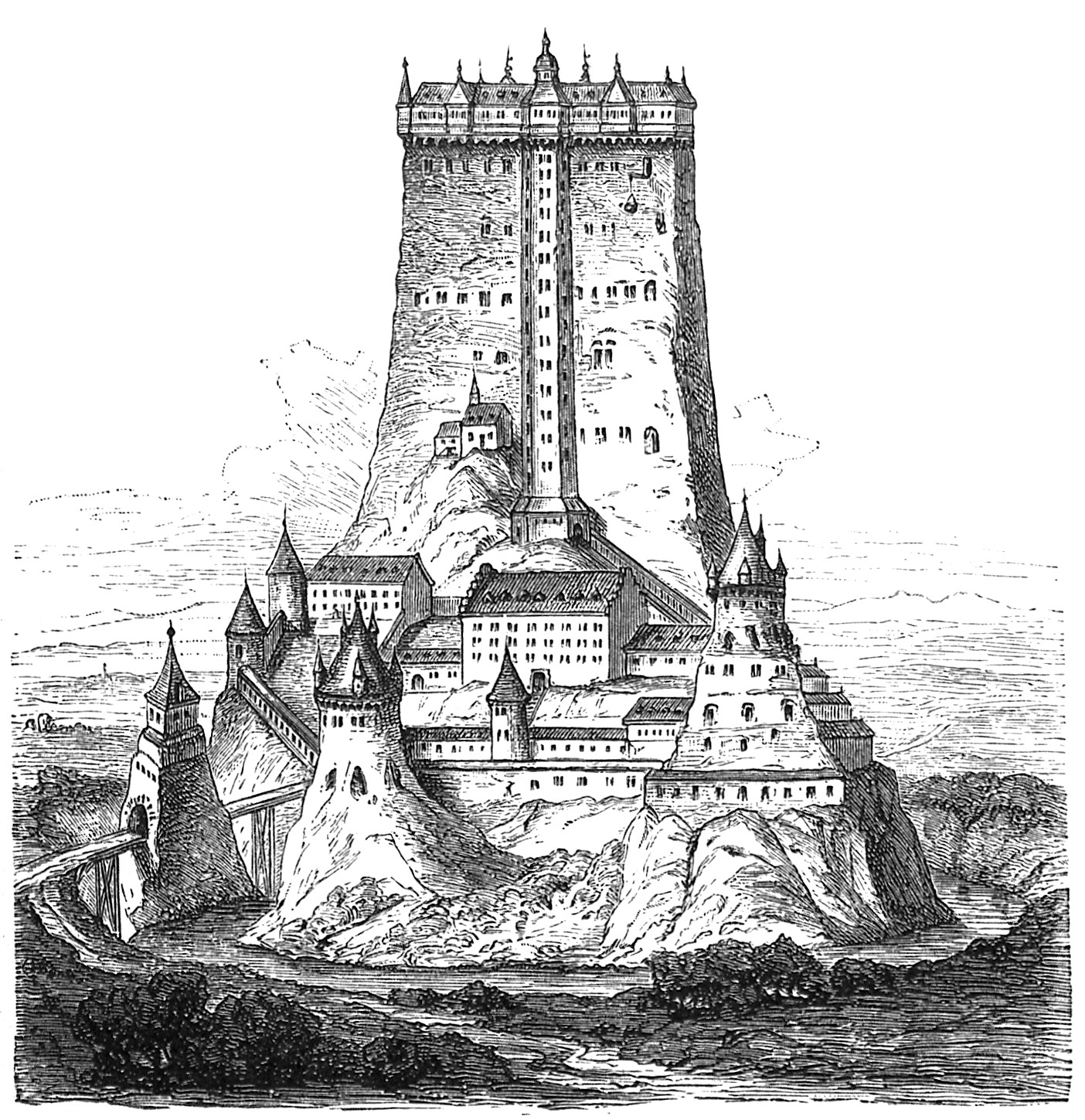
Reconstruction of Château du Fleckenstein drawn by Specklin

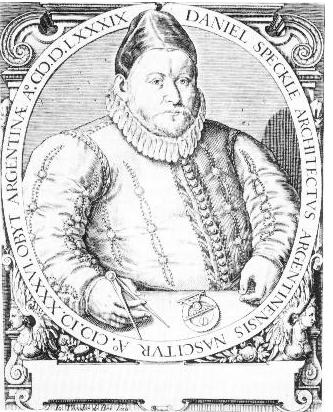
Portrait of Daniel Specklin

Daniel Specklin (or Speckle or Speckel) (1536 – 18 October 1589) was an Alsatian fortress architect, engineer, and cartographer.

He was born and died in Strasbourg.

== Biography ==
Daniel Specklin was born in 1536 in Strasbourg, which was then part of the Holy Roman Empire.

Daniel Specklin began as a fabric embroiderer and wood engraver before joining the Viennese court, where he discovered engineering and architecture. He became a renowned architect and engineer, and is particularly well known in Strasbourg for his work on fortifications.

He composed a manuscript entitled Collectanées, which disappeared when the Strasbourg library burned down during a bombardment in 1870. Rodolphe Reuss collected fragments and published them in 1890. Daniel Specklin's writings contain errors and legendary tales.

== Printed works ==
- Architectura von Vestungen (strassburg 1589)
