= Giovanni Battista Calvi =

- Born: Lombardy, Italy
- Died: 1564; Perpignan, Principality of Catalonia
- Citizenship: Italian
- Engineering career
- Discipline: Military
- Practice name: Giovan Battista Calvi; Gianbattista Calvi; Juan Bautista Calvi
- Employer: Spanish Monarchy

Giovanni Battista Calvi (also known as Giovan Battista Calvi, Gianbattista Calvi and/or Juan Bautista Calvi) was an Italian military engineer at the service of the Spanish Monarchy during the 16th century.

== Early career ==
Despite popular belief that Calvi was born in Sardinia, he was actually born in Lombardy in the early 16th century.

Prior to working for the Spanish Monarchy he worked as a civil engineer in Rome, under the direction of Antonio da Sangallo the Younger, on the façade of Palazzo Farnese. He later worked in Siena, at the time also under Spanish sovereignty, with Diego Hurtado de Mendoza as governor of the garrison. In 1552, he was sought out by Philip II (then only a Prince) to fortify the Spanish coasts and the frontier with France in the Roussillon.

== Reputation ==
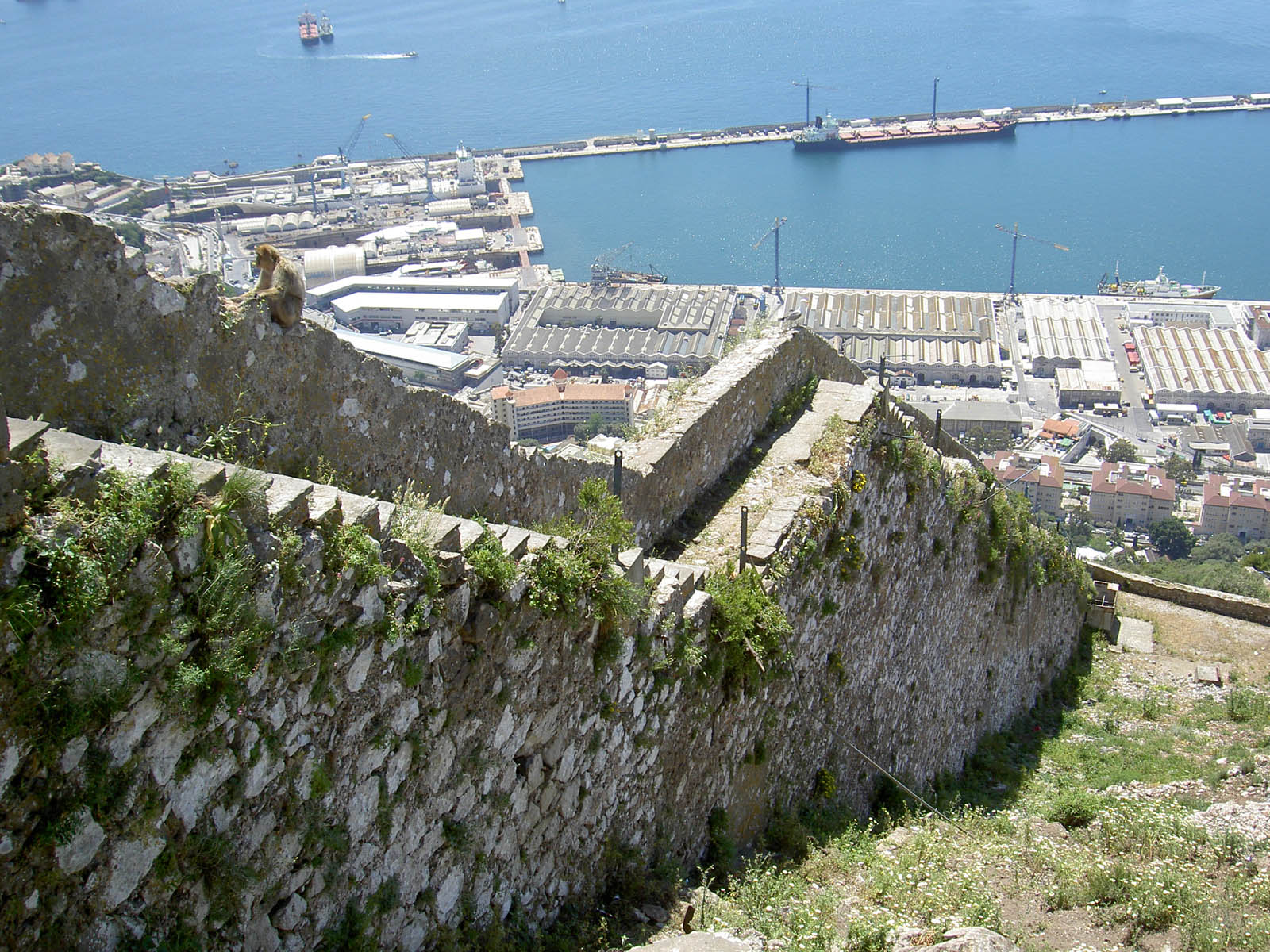
Remains of the Charles V Wall in Gibraltar.

Calvi was the first engineer to provide comprehensive reports on the status of the defensive projects of Spain and the Spanish North-African possessions. Besides his works in the Franco-Spanish frontier, he worked in the Balearic Islands, where he designed St. Philip's Castle in Port Mahon (since 1554, finished in 1558; it was one of the first forts to incorporate bastions in Spain), and the walls of Ibiza (since 1555); Barcelona (where he built the bastions of the Royal Shipyard); Roses, Cádiz (where he refurbished the walls)" or Gibraltar (where he was responsible for building Charles V Wall, protecting the town from southern attacks). During his inspection trips, he visited Mers El Kébir, Oran, Melilla, Valencia, Burgos, Medina del Campo, Valladolid or Granada. Calvi's relevance in the history of the military architecture in Spain has been remarked. It has been said that his work "is the basis of all what was subsequently accomplished in the fortifications of the Peninsular kingdoms" and that he was "one of the best engineers of the 16th century, the first to devise a global plan for the defense of the [Iberian] Peninsula".

He died in Perpignan in 1564.
