= Military history of Gibraltar during World War II =

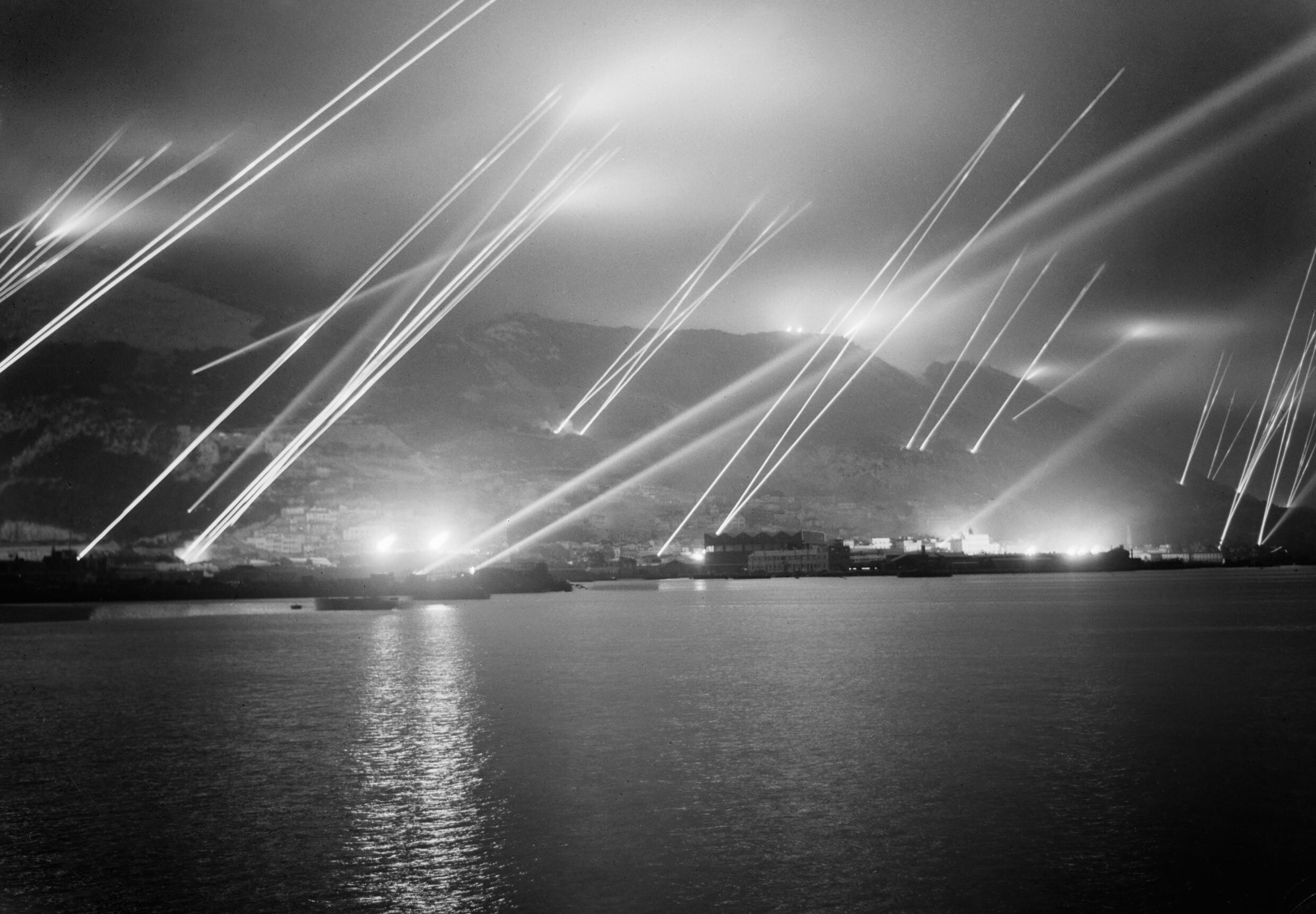
Searchlights in the night sky during an air-raid practice on Gibraltar, 20 November 1942

The military history of Gibraltar during World War II exemplifies Gibraltar's position as a British fortress from the early-18th century onwards and as a vital factor in British military strategy, both as a foothold on the continent of Europe, and as a bastion of British sea power. During World War II, Gibraltar served a vital role in both the Atlantic Theatre and the Mediterranean Theatre, controlling virtually all naval traffic moving between the Mediterranean Sea and the Atlantic Ocean.

In addition to its commanding position, Gibraltar provided a strongly-defended harbour from which ships could operate both in the Atlantic and in the Mediterranean. The Royal Navy's Force H, under the command of Vice-Admiral James Somerville was based in Gibraltar and had the task of maintaining naval superiority and providing a strong escort for convoys to and from the besieged island of Malta. During the course of the war, Gibraltar came under aerial bombardment from Vichy French aircraft and from aircraft of the Italian Royal Air Force (Regia Aeronautica) based on Sardinia. Additionally, the fortress was the focus of underwater attacks by the Italian Royal Navy (Regia Marina) commando frogman unit (Decima Flottiglia MAS) and their human torpedoes. This Italian unit was based on the interned Italian ship SS Olterra in the nearby Spanish harbour of Algeciras. A number of attacks were also carried out by Spanish and Gibraltarian agents acting on behalf of the German Abwehr.

Inside the Rock of Gibraltar itself, miles of tunnels were excavated from the limestone. Masses of rock were blasted out to build an "underground city". In huge man-made caverns, barracks, offices, and a fully-equipped hospital were constructed, complete with an operating theatre and X-ray equipment.

Operation Torch, the Allied invasion of French North Africa in November 1942, was coordinated from the "Rock". General Dwight D. Eisenhower, who was given command of the operation, set up his headquarters in Gibraltar during the planning phases of the operation. Following the successful completion of the North African campaign in May 1943 and the surrender of Italy in September 1943, Gibraltar's role shifted from that of a forward operating base to that of a rear-area supply position. The harbour continued to operate dry-docks and supply depots for the convoy routes through the Mediterranean until V-E Day in 1945.

== Prelude and evacuation ==
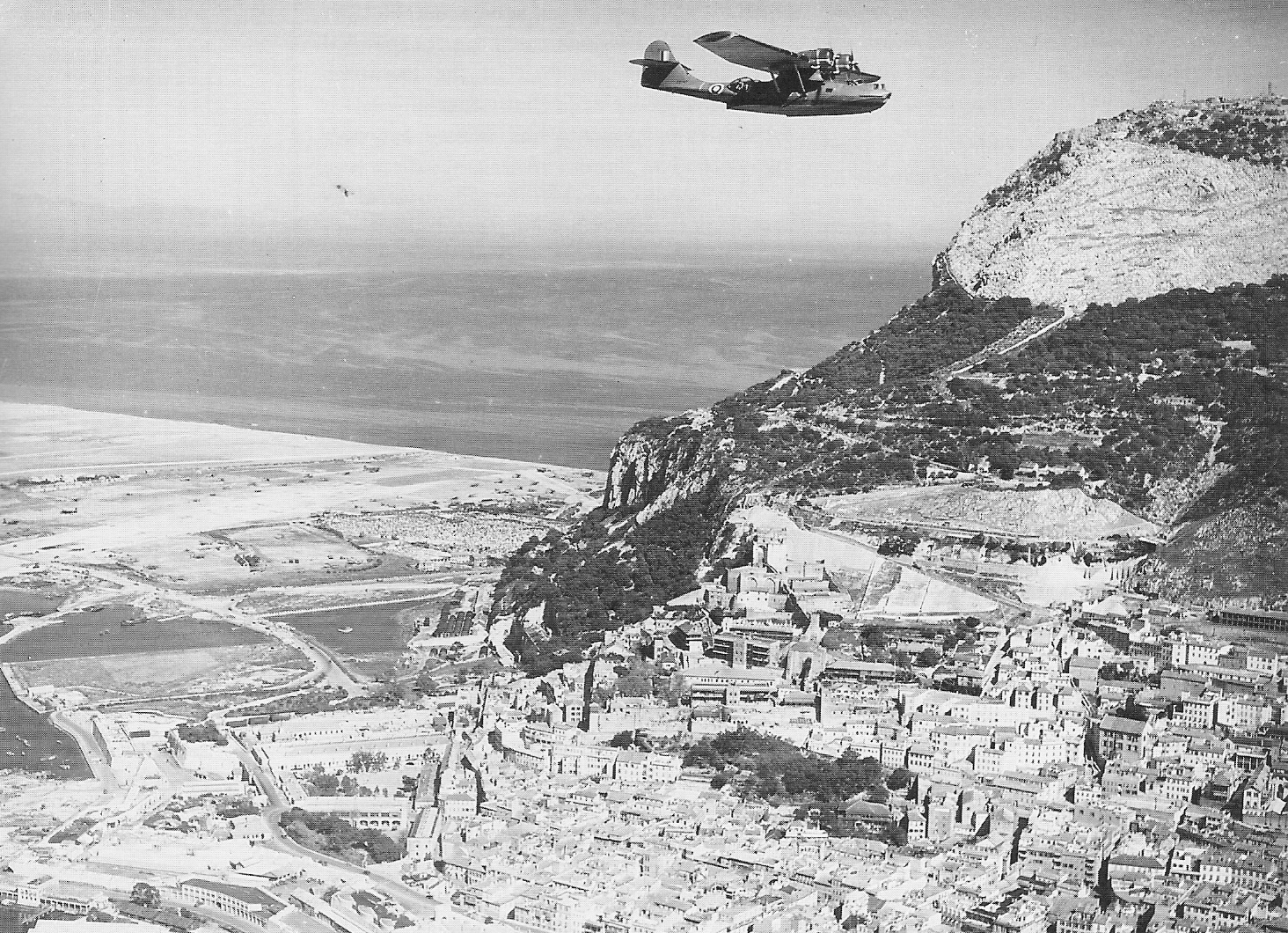
Military history of Gibraltar during World War II • Timeline of events • A Catalina flies by the North Front of the Rock as it leaves Gibraltar on a patrol, 1942 (Imperial War Museum)
Late 1939	Construction of a solid surface runway begins in Gibraltar.
9 Sep 1939	No. 202 Squadron RAF is ordered to Gibraltar.
25 Sep 1939	No 200 (Coastal) Group is formed as a subordinate formation to HQ RAF Mediterranean.
Jun 1940	13,500 civilian evacuees are shipped to Casablanca in French Morocco.
13 Jul 1940	Following the creation of Vichy France, Gibraltarian civilians are returned to Gibraltar prior to movement to other locations.
Jul 1940	Evacuees are shipped to the Atlantic island of Madeira and to London.
9 Oct 1940	1,093 refugees re-evacuated to Jamaica.
10 Mar 1941	Operation Felix, the German plan for the invasion of Gibraltar, is amended to become Operation Felix-Heinrich, which delays the invasion until after the fall of the Soviet Union, effectively putting an end to German invasion plans.
Late 1941	Plans for Operation Tracer, a stay-behind plan to be put in place in the event of an invasion of Gibraltar, are formulated.
Jan 1942	Equipment trials for Operation Tracer begin.
Mid-1942	Operation Tracer is pronounced ready for deployment.
Jul 1942	Lieutenant General Dwight D. Eisenhower is appointed Allied Commander-in-Chief of Operation Torch.
5 Nov 1942	Eisenhower arrives in Gibraltar to take command
4 Jul 1942	A Liberator bomber from RAF Transport Command takes off from Gibraltar and crashes, killing Władysław Sikorski, Polish military and political leader
Nov 1943	Resettlement Board established.
6 Apr 1944	First group of 1,367 repatriates arrives on Gibraltar directly from the United Kingdom.
28 May 1944	First repatriation party leaves Madeira for Gibraltar.
8 May 1945	Victory in Europe Day

The Second World War dramatically changed the lives of Gibraltarians. The decision to enforce mass evacuation in order to increase the strength of the Rock with more military and naval personnel meant that most Gibraltarians (some for up to ten years) had nowhere to call 'home'. Only those civilians with essential jobs were allowed to stay but it gave the entire community a sense of being 'British' by sharing in the war effort.

In early June 1940, about 13,500 evacuees were shipped to Casablanca in French Morocco. However, following the capitulation of the French to the German armies later in June 1940, the new Pro-German French Vichy Government found the presence of Gibraltarian evacuees in Casablanca an embarrassment and sought opportunities for their removal. The opportunity soon arose when 15 British cargo vessels arrived under Commodore Crichton, repatriating 15,000 French servicemen who had been rescued from Dunkirk. Once their own rescued servicemen had disembarked, the ships were interned until they agreed to take away all the evacuees. Although Crichton was unable to obtain permission to clean and restock his ships (and contrary to British Admiralty orders which forbade the taking on of evacuees), when he saw the mass of civilians pouring through the dockyards, he opened up his gangways for boarding. Just beforehand, the British fleet had destroyed a number of French warships at Mers el-Kebir in order to prevent them ending up in German hands. The attack, during which 1,297 French sailors died, led to high tensions, which were evident when families were forced at bayonet point by French troops to board taking only what they could carry, leaving many possessions behind. However, when they arrived at Gibraltar, the governor would not allow them to land, fearing that once the evacuees were back on the Rock, it would be virtually impossible to evacuate them a second time. Crowds gathered in John Mackintosh Square in the centre of Gibraltar as the news broke, speeches were made and two city councillors accompanied by the acting president of the exchange and commercial library went to see the governor (Sir Clive Liddell) to ask that the evacuees be allowed to land. After receiving instructions from London, a landing was allowed as long as the evacuees returned when other ships arrived to take them away from the Rock, and by 13 July the re-evacuation back to Gibraltar had been completed.

British conservative politician Oliver Stanley agreed to accept the evacuees in the United Kingdom, but he argued with Gibraltar over the number of people involved. The Governor, he declared, had given the number of evacuees first as 13,000, then as 14,000 and finally as 16,000. He asked for the situation to be clarified, stressing the shortage of accommodation in Britain and insisting that only 13,000 could be accepted, 2,000 of whom were to be sent to the Portuguese Atlantic island of Madeira. The situation, replied General Liddell on 19 July, "is that this is a fortress liable to heavy and immediate attack and there should be no civilians here whereas there are 22,000. The 13,000 was the number sent to Morocco, and more would have been sent had the situation there not altered." In London the evacuees were placed in the hands of the Ministry of Health, and many were housed in Kensington area. Concern for them in Gibraltar mounted as the air raids against London intensified, coupled with the arrival of harrowing letters, describing the circumstances in which the evacuees were living.

In September rumours were already circulating among the evacuees, and in Gibraltar, that the possibility of re-evacuating the Gibraltarians once more was being mooted, this time the destination being Jamaica, in the West Indies. After much contention, it was decided to send a party directly from Gibraltar to the island, and 1,093 evacuees left for Jamaica direct, on 9 October, with more following later on. However, petitions followed and the demands were met, partly for strategic reasons and the lack of available shipping. The situation at the end of 1940, therefore, was that approximately 2,000 evacuees were in Jamaica and a lesser number in Madeira, with the bulk of around 10,000 housed in the London area.

== Royal Air Force involvement: 1939–1941 ==
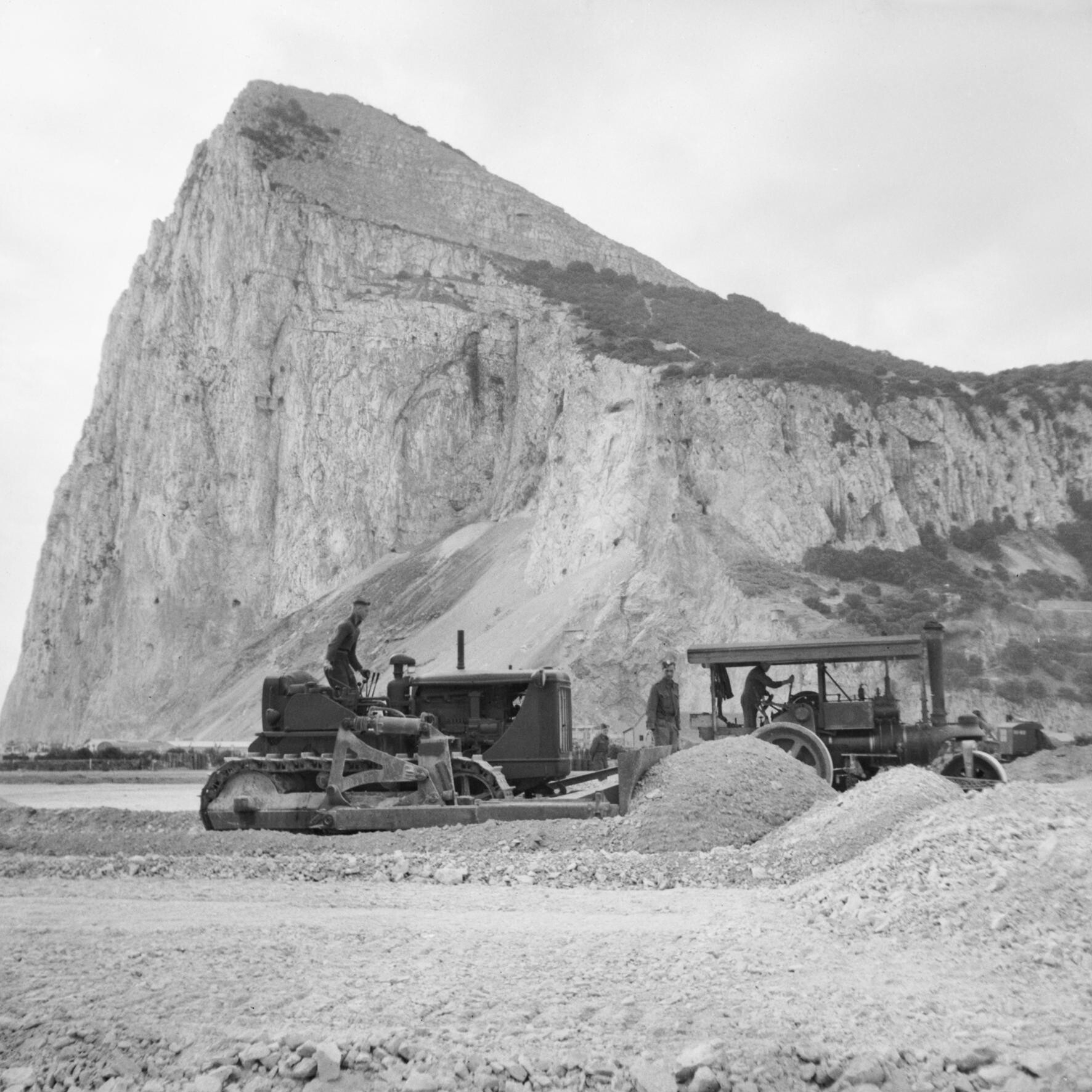
A bulldozer and steamroller being used during the construction of a new aerodrome later to become Gibraltar International Airport, November 1941.

Construction of a solid surface runway began in late 1939 and in 1940 it was proposed to extend the existing runway to a length of 1,550 yards (1,417 m). The land reclamation commenced towards the end of 1941 along with the construction of an RAF camp at the "North Front", now RAF Gibraltar. The RAF dispatched their next squadron to Gibraltar at this time and it was in September 1939 that war with Germany was declared and the strong possibility of German submarines concentrating in the Strait of Gibraltar and using Spanish port facilities, loomed large in Admiralty thinking. So at 09:00 (UTC) on 9 September 1939, No. 202 Squadron RAF was ordered to Gibraltar, loaded to the gunwales with equipment.

On 25 September 1939, No. 200 (Coastal) Group RAF was formed as a subordinate formation to HQ RAF Mediterranean in control of No 202 Squadron. The Group's function was the control of Royal Air Force units operating from Gibraltar. In late 1940 the Group was transferred to Coastal Command. Later a combined headquarters was formed which commenced operations in early 1942.

== Threats of military action by Spain ==
On 19 June 1940 the Spanish leader Francisco Franco offered to bring Spain into the war on the side of Germany, then on 18 July 1940 Franco declared that Spain had 2,000,000 soldiers ready to retake Gibraltar and expand Spanish interests in North Africa. Nothing came of these threats as Spain realised how well defended Gibraltar was and the economic effects of a blockade of Spanish ports, especially on oil imports, so they pulled back the offer of being willing to enter the war on the side of the Axis forces.

== Vichy French attacks: 1940 ==
On 18 July 1940, after the attack on the French Fleet at Mers-el-Kébir by the British, the Vichy government authorized a bombing raid of Gibraltar as a response. Little damage was reported to have been done but caused the first casualties. The attack was half-hearted and the majority of the bombs were deliberately dropped short of their target. However, one soldier and four civilians were killed in the bombing.

On 24 September, the Italian Stefani news agency reported: "As a reprisal for the bombardment of Dakar yesterday morning, one-hundred-and-twenty French aircraft based in Morocco attacked Gibraltar." On the same day, the United Press Agency reported: "The French government has issued an official denial of reports, according to which French aircraft were said to have attacked Gibraltar. Up until now, no reprisals have been undertaken." But the United Press report ended on an ominous note with: "French reprisals are imminent."

Again, on the same day, the Vichy French government issued orders for the naval base and city of Gibraltar to be bombarded. As a result, six bomber squadrons of the Vichy French Air Force (Armée de l'Air de Vichy) and four squadrons of the Vichy French Navy (Marine nationale de Vichy) were employed in the operation. The 64 bombers flew from bases in Oran, Tafaroui (in Algeria), Meknes, Mediouna, and Port Lyautey (in Morocco). The French action was approved by both the German Armistice Commission and the Italian Armistice Commission.

The French dropped 150 bombs on Gibraltar during the raid. They inflicted heavy damage on the fortress and encountered no British aircraft while doing so. The South Mole and a large ship in the harbour were heavily damaged. In the northern part of Gibraltar, fires broke out. However, most of the Vichy bombs again fell into the sea.

On 25 September, the French returned with a larger force of eighty-three bombers to cause additional damage to the naval base and harbour installations. Again, aircraft of the British Royal Air Force made no appearance. However, the French crews did report encountering heavy anti-aircraft fire. One LeO 451 bomber was lost and 13 other aircraft were lightly damaged during the two days of bombing attacks. The British armed trawler HMT Stella Sirius was sunk by bombs, and several civilians were killed. The Vichy authorities made it clear that bombing raids of Gibraltar would continue as long as the British continued to attack Dakar.

The air attack on 25 September was the last by Vichy forces on Gibraltar.

== Operation Felix: 1940–1941 ==
Meeting at Hendaye. Hitler and Franco at the railway station of Hendaye, France.

For the aerial attack on the harbour of Gibraltar forces are to be designated which will guarantee abundant success. For the subsequent operations against naval objectives and for support of the attack of the Rock mainly dive bombers units are to be transferred to Spain. Sufficient anti-aircraft artillery is to be allocated to the army units including its use against ground targets.

— Operation Felix, Directive No. 18, Section IV: Luftwaffe by Adolf Hitler

The Rock came through the war relatively unscathed but, given its strategic importance, Germany made plans to capture Gibraltar. Codenamed "Felix", the plan, which was signed by Adolf Hitler himself, was formulated at the highest level of command. With or without permission, Germany would take entry through Spain and attack Gibraltar, driving the British out of the Western Mediterranean. The Strait would be effectively closed to the Allies once Gibraltar was in German hands, forcing Asia-bound Allied shipping to steam all the way around Africa rather than to proceed to the east via the shorter route through the Mediterranean and the Suez Canal. The Rock was to be heavily dive bombed by planes leaving France but landing afterward at Spanish air bases. To deny a possible Spanish capture of the base, the German planners decided that the final attack to seize Gibraltar was to be made by German troops alone.

Operation Felix: Invasion plans of Nazi Germany and probable routes of British invasion.

Diplomatic failure at the highest levels of government (Meeting at Hendaye) prevented the operation, which had been drawn up in detail by the Wehrmacht in the summer and autumn of 1940, from occurring at the beginning of 1941.

General Ludwig Kübler's XLIX Corps would conduct the actual attack on the Rock. The assault forces would comprise the Infantry Regiment Großdeutschland, the 98th Regiment of the 1st Mountain Division, 26 medium and heavy artillery battalions, three observation battalions, three engineer battalions, two smoke battalions, a detachment of 150 Brandenburgers, and up to 150 miniature remote controlled demolition vehicles (Goliaths), packed with high explosives.

As part of a combined-force operation, the German Air Force (Luftwaffe) would contribute Ju 88As, Stukas, Messerschmitts, three light AA battalions, and three heavy AA battalions. Nazi Germany's Kriegsmarine would cooperate by using U-boats to interfere with British naval movement and emplacing coastal batteries to further discourage the Royal Navy.

On 10 March 1941, with Operation Barbarossa looming, Felix was amended to Operation Felix-Heinrich, whereby German troops would be withdrawn from the USSR to capture Gibraltar. As a result of Spanish dictator Francisco Franco's intransigence, the operation was postponed, modified, and ultimately abandoned.

== Italian bombing of Gibraltar ==
From Sardinia, Italian Piaggio P.108 bombers attacked Gibraltar several times, mainly in 1942. The last raids on Gibraltar were during Operation Torch, when the same bombers also attacked Oran.

The only unit of the Regia Aeronautica (Royal Air Force) ever to fly the Piaggio P.108 was the "274th Long-Range Bombardment Squadron". This unit was formed in May 1941 around the first machines that came off the assembly lines. The training of the crews lasted far longer than anticipated and only in June 1942 the 274th became operational. The most spectacular raids with the P. 108 bombers were flown in October 1942 when several night attacks against Gibraltar were undertaken from Sardinia.

After the armistice of Cassibile (8 September), the German-allied Italian Social Republic launched at least two raids on Gibraltar: one on the night of 4–5 June 1944 with ten SM.79bis aircraft and another on 6 June with nine aircraft. Both sorties were undertaken by the Gruppo Aerosiluranti "Buscaglia–Faggioni".

Date	Unit	Bomber	Number
17/18 (Note: The slash notation indicates a night raid.) July 1940	Reparto sperimentale	SM.82	3
25/26 July 1940	Reparto sperimentale (Note: "Experimental Department")	SM.82	3
20/21 August 1940	Reparto sperimentale	SM.82	2
6 June 1941	Reparto sperimentale	SM.82	1
11 July 1941		SM.82	1
13 July 1941		SM.82	1
14 July 1941		SM.82	1
1 April 1942	47ª Squadriglia (Note: "47th Squadron")	SM.82	3
28/29 June 1942	274ª Squadriglia Autonoma Bombardamento a Grande Raggio (Note: "274th Independent Long-Range Bombardment Squadron")	P.108B	5
3 July 1942	274ª Squadriglia Autonoma Bombardamento a Grande Raggio	P.108B	1
24 September 1942	274ª Squadriglia Autonoma Bombardamento a Grande Raggio	P.108B	2
20 October 1942	274ª Squadriglia Autonoma Bombardamento a Grande Raggio	P.108B	4
21 October 1942	274ª Squadriglia Autonoma Bombardamento a Grande Raggio	P.108B	3
19 July 1943	132º Gruppo Autonomo Aerosiluranti (Note: "132nd Independent Torpedo Bomber Squadron")	SM.79	10 (Note: Operation Scoglio: only nine planes actually took off and only two reached the target and managed to drop their torpedoes in the harbour.)

== Italian frogmen raids 1940–1943 ==
Known as the "Floating Trojan Horse of Gibraltar", Decima Flottiglia MAS, an Italian commando frogman unit created during the fascist government, engaged in numerous attacks against the harbour at Gibraltar.

Gibraltar was a very tempting target for the Italians, who saw it as a refuge for British warships and allied merchant shipping. The Italian frogmen originally used a Spanish villa (Villa Carmela) located two miles (3 km) from Gibraltar owned by an Italian officer who had married a Spanish woman named Conchita Ramognino. Their base was shifted later to the Italian tanker SS Olterra, interned in Algeciras.

Date	Chronicle of operations of the Decima Flottiglia MAS in Gibraltar
21 August 1940	The Italian submarine Iride left La Spezia in Italy with plans to attack Gibraltar on 22 August 1940.
24 September 1940	The Italian Submarine Sciré, commanded by Junio Valerio Borghese, left La Spezia carrying three manned torpedoes and six crewmen. The attack was called off on 29 September and the submarine ordered back to La Maddalena because the British fleet had left Gibraltar before the Sciré could get into position.
21 October 1940	The Sciré left La Spezia and sailed to Gibraltar carrying three manned torpedoes and six crewmen. The manned torpedoes had malfunctions and only one entered the harbour, but damaged no ships. Two of the crewmen were captured and the other four escaped to Spain, eventually returning to Italy. The four escapees included Teseo Tesei and Alcide Pedretti. Their manned torpedo later washed ashore at Espigon Bay, and was interned by Spanish authorities.
25 May 1941	The Sciré left La Spezia carrying three manned torpedoes. At Cádiz (Spain), it secretly loaded six crewmen from a tanker Fulgor. They found no warships in Gibraltar because HMS Renown, Ark Royal and Sheffield had been ordered into the Atlantic as part of the search for the German battleship Bismarck, which was sunk on May 27. An attempted attack on merchant ships on a roadstead failed; the crews escaped to Spain and returned to Italy by plane.
10 September 1941	The Sciré left La Spezia bearing three manned torpedoes. It secretly loaded six crewmen in Cádiz and sank three ships: two tankers named Denbydale and Fiona Shell, and a cargo ship, the Durham. The crews of the torpedoes swam to Spanish territory after discarding their devices and later returned to Italy.
July 1942	Italian frogmen set up a base in the Italian cargo ship Olterra which was interned in Algeciras near Gibraltar. All materials had to be moved secretly through Spain thus limiting operations.
13 July 1942	12 Italian frogmen swam from Villa Carmela, at Algeciras bay, into Gibraltar harbour and set explosives, sinking four freighters (Meta, Empire Snipe, Baron Douglas, Shuma).
15 September 1942	Italian frogmen sank steamship Ravens Point.
8 December 1942	Six Italians on three torpedoes left the Olterra to attack the British warships HMS Nelson, Formidable, and Furious. A British patrol boat killed one torpedo's crew (Lt. Visintini and Petty Officer Magro) with a depth charge. Their bodies were recovered, and their swimfins were taken and used by two of Gibraltar's British guard divers; Sydney Knowles and Commander Lionel Crabb. A British patrol boat detected another torpedo, and pursued and shot at it, capturing its two crewmen. The remaining torpedo returned to the Olterra, having lost its rear rider.
8 May 1943	Three Italian manned torpedoes left the cargo ship Olterra to attack Gibraltar in bad weather and sank the American Liberty ship Pat Harrison and the British freighters Mahsud and Camerata.
3 August 1943	Three Italian manned torpedoes left the Olterra to attack Gibraltar, and again sank three merchantmen: the Norwegian Thorshøvdi, the American Liberty Harrison Grey Otis and the British Stanridge.

== Abwehr saboteurs from Spain ==
Lesser known than the Italian actions were the sabotage operations and limpet-mine attacks carried out by Spanish and Gibraltarian agents recruited in the Campo de Gibraltar by the Germans. The Abwehr contacted a Spanish staff officer from Campo de Gibraltar, Lieutenant Colonel Eleuterio Sánchez Rubio, a Spanish officer, member of Falange and coordinator of the intelligence operations in the Campo, to establish a network of saboteurs with access to Gibraltar. Sánchez Rubio designated Emilio Plazas Tejera, also a member of Falange, as operations chief of the organisation. Most of the recruits for the sabotage operations were Spaniards from the Campo. A combination of financial reward, ideological commitment and some threats and intimidation were used to gather a significant number of agents. According to the British intelligence, there were at least 183 Spaniards and Gibraltarians involved in the espionage and sabotage operations against Gibraltar.

Sabotage operations were ordered from Berlin in the late autumn of 1940, but actual work did not start until early 1941. The first operations were unsuccessful. A first attempt to smuggle a bomb into Gibraltar was aborted, as the timing device was faulty. In February there was a large explosion in the North Tunnel, and in April a bomb blew up near the airfield. In June 1941, however, the British intelligence foiled a new attempt, by a German agent, to attach a mine alongside an Allied cargo ship. Another attempt failed when Plazas placed a bomb inside an ammunition store but was not able to prime the explosive. It was not until 1942 that the operations begun to succeed. In January 1942, two Spanish agents managed to destroy two aircraft at the North Front landing strip.

Financed, trained and equipped by the Germans, the Spanish saboteurs sank the armed trawler HMT Erin, and destroyed the auxiliary minesweeper HMT Honjo, which resulted in the deaths of an officer from the carrier HMS Argus and six British ratings on 18 January 1942. Plazas was assisted by the Spanish naval commander of Puente Mayorga, Manuel Romero Hume, who allowed him to beach a rowboat there. The British intelligence was able however to counteract the sabotage operations. In March 1942, a Gibraltarian, José Key, one of the most prominent agents working for the Germans, responsible for the collection of information on military movements for the Abwehr was arrested and executed in Wandsworth Prison in late 1942. By September 1942, Plazas, whose activities were closely monitored by the British at that time, resigned and left Carlos Calvo, his second in command, in charge of the operations. In late 1942, the German headquarters in Berlin ordered the sabotage operations being expanded. In early 1943, the arrival of an experienced head of Abwehr operations in Spain improved the outreach of the operations.

In March 1943 an ammunition dump was blown up by Calvo's agents. The British, growing suspicious of some of the saboteurs, banned them from entering Gibraltar. This forced the Abwehr to ask Calvo for new personnel. A Spaniard working on the Rock, José Martín Muñoz, was responsible for the explosion and fire at a large fuel tank at Coaling Island on 30 June 1943. This mission, however, would be the first and the last for Muñoz, because he was cornered and arrested by British authorities in August, when he tried to smuggle a bomb into a weapons magazine inside Ragged Staff Cave. After being sentenced to death as a saboteur, he was hanged on 11 January 1944 in Gibraltar by British executioner Albert Pierrepoint. A member of an unrelated Abwehr sabotage network, Luis López Cordón-Cuenca (also arrested in 1943) was executed by Pierrepoint on the same day. Calvo himself was put under arrest by the Spanish police and neutralized. He would be a free man again in December, when he rejoined the Abwehr in Madrid, under direct orders of Wolfgang Blaum, aka Baumann, head of the sabotage section in Spain. After a Falangist attempt against the life of pro-allied General José Enrique Varela, perpetrated by Sánchez Rubio network's agent Juan José Domínguez and a meeting between Anthony Eden and the Spanish ambassador in London, Jacobo Fitz-James Stuart, Abwehr activities around Gibraltar came to an end.

== Operation Tracer: 1941–1942 ==
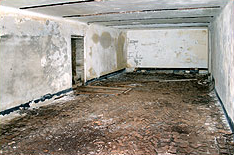
Main room of Operation Tracer's Stay Behind Cave.

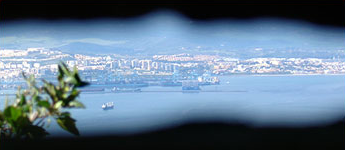
View over the Bay of Gibraltar through observation slit at west observation post of Operation Tracer.

Operation Tracer was a top-secret British stay-behind spying mission that was only to be implemented if Gibraltar was captured by the Axis Powers. Six men were to be sealed in a cave and left with enough supplies for 7 years. The volunteers—two doctors, three signalmen and their leader—would run an observation post with one 12-inch (300 mm) by 6-inch (150 mm) slit looking over the harbour and a concealed outdoor terrace over the Mediterranean. The team would then wire back all shipping movements to the British Admiralty.

They were told there would be no way out and anyone who died within the chamber would have to be embalmed and cemented into the brick floor.

As the threat of invasion was clearly felt in late 1941, an idea for a series of secret observation posts (first in Gibraltar and later in other places like Malta and Aden) was put together under Operation Tracer.

Work in Gibraltar began immediately under Commander Geoffrey Birley and his chief engineer Colonel Fordham. The site chosen at Lord Airey's Battery on the southern tip of the Rock already had an existing tunnelling scheme for a shelter. Extensive trials of the equipment began in January 1942 under the eye of MI6 radio expert Colonel Richard Gambier-Parry. Much thought was also given to the type of men needed for such a strange and demanding task. A member of Scott's ill-fated expedition to the Antarctic, George Murray Levick was called up as Surgeon-Commander to advise on survival techniques. There were practical matters such as diet, exercise, sanitation, and clothing to consider as well as vital "psychology of the personnel". The full team was in place by the end of summer 1942 and their cavern fully equipped and ready for occupation. A comprehensive manual was prepared on all aspects of the operation and it was considered that similar secret lookout posts should be prepared throughout the world in the event of future wars. However, Operation Tracer was never needed, as Adolf Hitler turned his attention away from Gibraltar and towards the Eastern Front.

The operation had been clouded in mystery until the discovery of papers at the Public Record Office in Kew UK. Previously in the 1960s, details of the story were told to a journalist by his intelligence service contacts and he wrote these up as "Operation Monkey", yet facts were very sparse.

In 1997 "Stay Behind Cave" (as it was nicknamed) was discovered in Gibraltar by the Gibraltar Caving Group, but no account was ever obtained from anyone associated with the mission. The discovery came about when the group encountered a strong gust of wind in a tunnel. Further searching led them to break through a wall into chambers which had never been used and had remained sealed for over 50 years.

In November 2006 Jim Crone and Sergeant Major Pete Jackson, senior tunnel guide with the Royal Gibraltar Regiment, met possibly the only member of Operation Tracer still alive when they travelled to meet Dr. W. A. Bruce Cooper at his home in England. Cooper, 92 at the time, provided an opportunity to shed light on the operation with his direct involvement in the mission as a Surgeon-Lieutenant in the Royal Navy Volunteer Reserve (RNVR). He recalled stories about his colleagues, his training, and his feelings about the task.

== Mediterranean U-boat Campaign: 1941–1944 ==
The Mediterranean U-boat Campaign lasted approximately from 21 September 1941 to May 1944. The Kriegsmarine tried to isolate Gibraltar, Malta, and Suez and disrupt Britain's trade routes. More than sixty U-boats were sent to intercept Allied shipping in the Mediterranean Sea. Many of these U-boats were themselves attacked negotiating the Strait of Gibraltar controlled by Britain. Nine U-boats were sunk while attempting passage and ten more were damaged.

== North African Campaign: 1942 ==
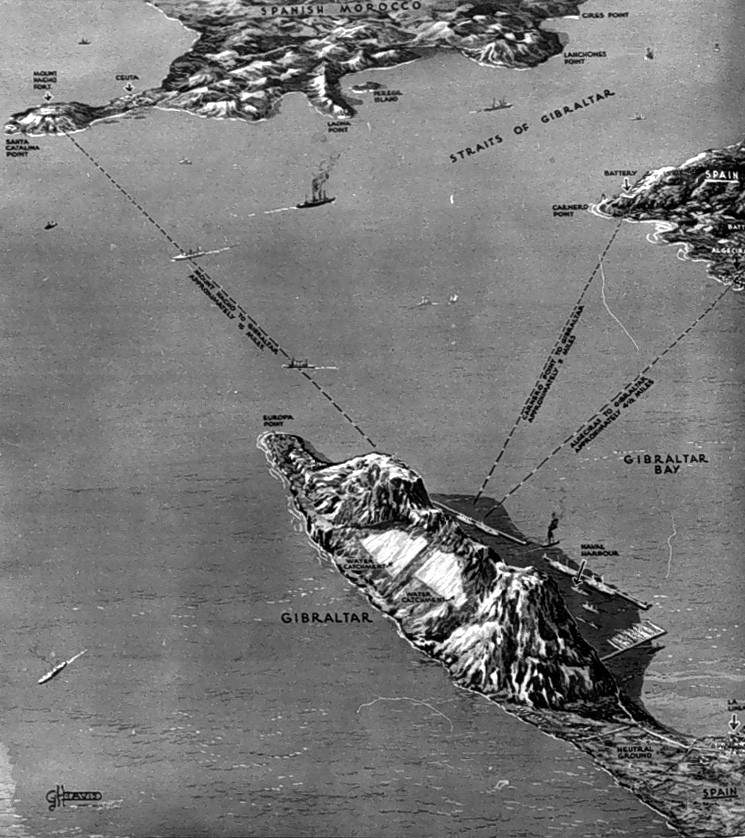
1939 map of the Strait of Gibraltar as published in The Illustrated London News.

Plans for the Allied counter offensive after the attack on Pearl Harbor were ongoing by mid-1942. An invasion of Europe in 1943 was thought unworkable, but the allies could attack the "soft underbelly of Europe" through the Mediterranean, as Prime Minister Winston Churchill put it. Devised by President Franklin Roosevelt and Churchill and code named Operation Torch, the plan was to occupy French North Africa: Morocco, Algeria, and Tunisia. From these French colonies, attacks could be launched that would drive Italy out of the war.

In July 1942, Lieutenant General Dwight D. Eisenhower^{[I]} was appointed Allied Commander-in-Chief of Operation Torch. Churchill placed Gibraltar under the command of General Eisenhower as the temporary headquarters for this, the first large-scale Anglo-American operation of the war. He arrived in Gibraltar on 5 November 1942 to take over, not just command of Operation Torch itself, but also military command of Gibraltar.

General Eisenhower stayed at The Convent, the official governor's residence, but his operational headquarters were in a small chamber in a tunnel in the heart of the Rock. In his memoirs General Eisenhower wrote:

The subterranean passages under the Rock provided the sole available office space, and in them was located the signal equipment by which we expected to keep in touch with the commanders of the three assault forces. The eternal darkness of the tunnels was here and there partially pierced by feeble electric bulbs. Damp, cold air in block-long passages was heavy with stagnation and did not noticeably respond to the clattering efforts of electric fans. Through the arched ceilings came a constant drip, drip, drip of surface water that faithfully but drearily ticked off the seconds of the interminable, almost unendurable, wait which always occurs between completion of a military plan and the moment action begins.

One hundred thousand soldiers on the high seas in a multitude of transports converged on Gibraltar. More than 400 aircraft of all types were crammed into the dispersal areas around the Gibraltar runway. Fighters had been shipped in crates and assembled on the airfield. Every available area of storage was taken up with ammunition, fuel, and other essential supplies. 168 American pilots were housed in the RAF messes at North Front.

On 8 November 1942, 466 aircraft from Gibraltar landed on captured North African airfields.

From their headquarters in Gibraltar, General Eisenhower and Admiral Sir Andrew Browne Cunningham^{[III]} directed Operation Torch, the first major combined combat operation during World War II involving American and British forces.

=== War tunnels ===
Given that Gibraltar was a small town with only a few defences protecting it, the solution was to build a massive series of tunnels and chambers inside the natural protection of the Rock of Gibraltar. This "town" inside the Rock contained its own power station, water supply, and hospital. Some soldiers posted here would not see the light of day for months on end. Two Canadian engineer companies, the only soldiers with diamond-tipped drills and 5 British engineer companies, added some 30 miles (48 km) of such tunnels, a feat thought impossible at the time. That was enough to hold all 30,000 troops on the rock. Today, the rock has more tunnels than roads.

== Death of Władysław Sikorski: 1943 ==
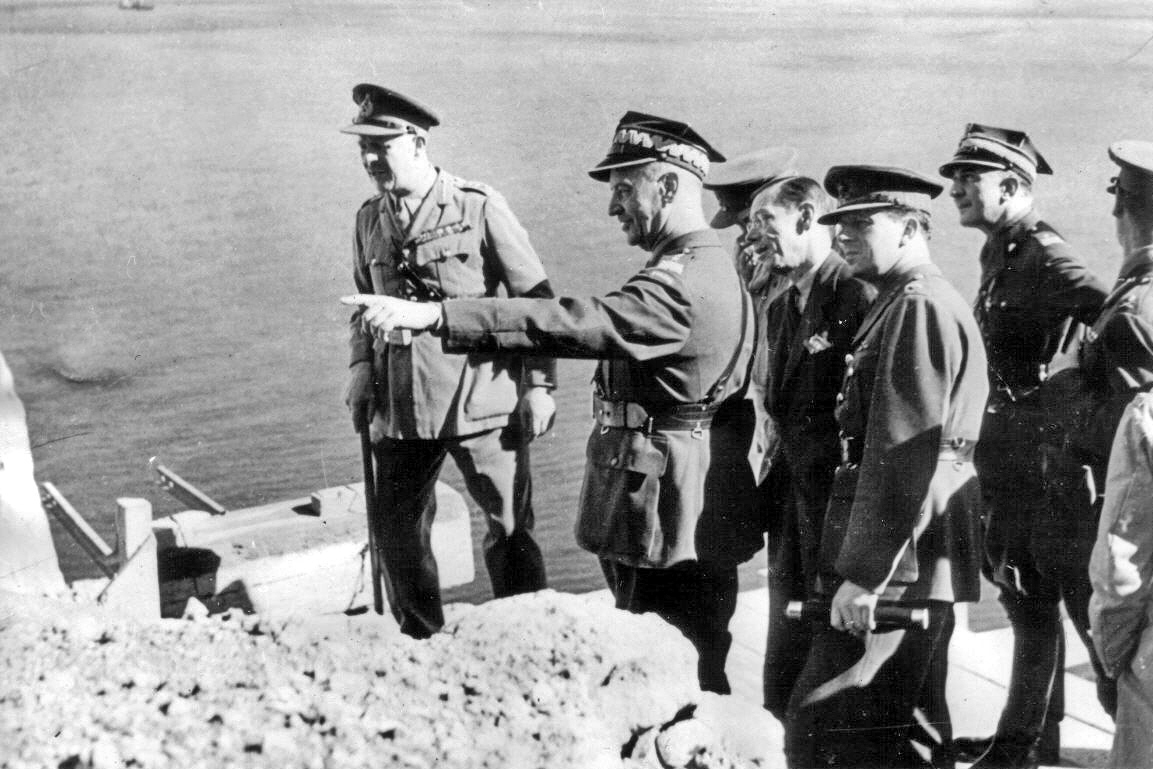
Sikorski atop the Rock of Gibraltar, surveying the fortifications

On 4 July 1943, a Liberator bomber from RAF Transport Command took off from Gibraltar for England. On board was General Władysław Sikorski, Prime Minister of Poland's London-based government in exile and Commander-in-Chief of its armed forces, returning from visiting Polish troops in the Middle East.

The aircraft climbed normally from the runway, levelled off to gather speed but then suddenly lost height and crashed into the harbour. The 62-year-old general died, along with 15 others. The sole survivor was the Czech-born pilot, Eduard Prchal, who was rescued by an RAF launch. The bodies of five passengers and crew, including Sikorski's daughter, were never found.

The coffins of General Sikorski and his Chief-of-Staff, General Kilimecki, were draped in the Polish National Flag and lay in state in the Cathedral of St. Mary the Crowned. After a Requiem Mass, the bodies were carried in procession to H.M. Dockyard with full Military Honours to be shipped to London in anticipation that General Sikorski's remains would one day be returned to a liberated Poland. The route to the dockyard was lined by British troops and the coffins carried and escorted by Polish Servicemen.

=== Investigation ===
In 1943 a British Court of Inquiry investigated the crash of Sikorski's Liberator II AL523, but was unable to determine the probable cause, finding only that it was an accident and the "aircraft became uncontrollable for reasons which cannot be established". A popular theory was insufficient technical maintenance leading to jamming aircraft controls. Despite the court's finding, the political context of the event, coupled with a variety of curious circumstances, immediately gave rise to speculation that Sikorski's death had been no accident, and may in fact have been the direct result of a Soviet, British or even Polish conspiracy.

== Aftermath ==
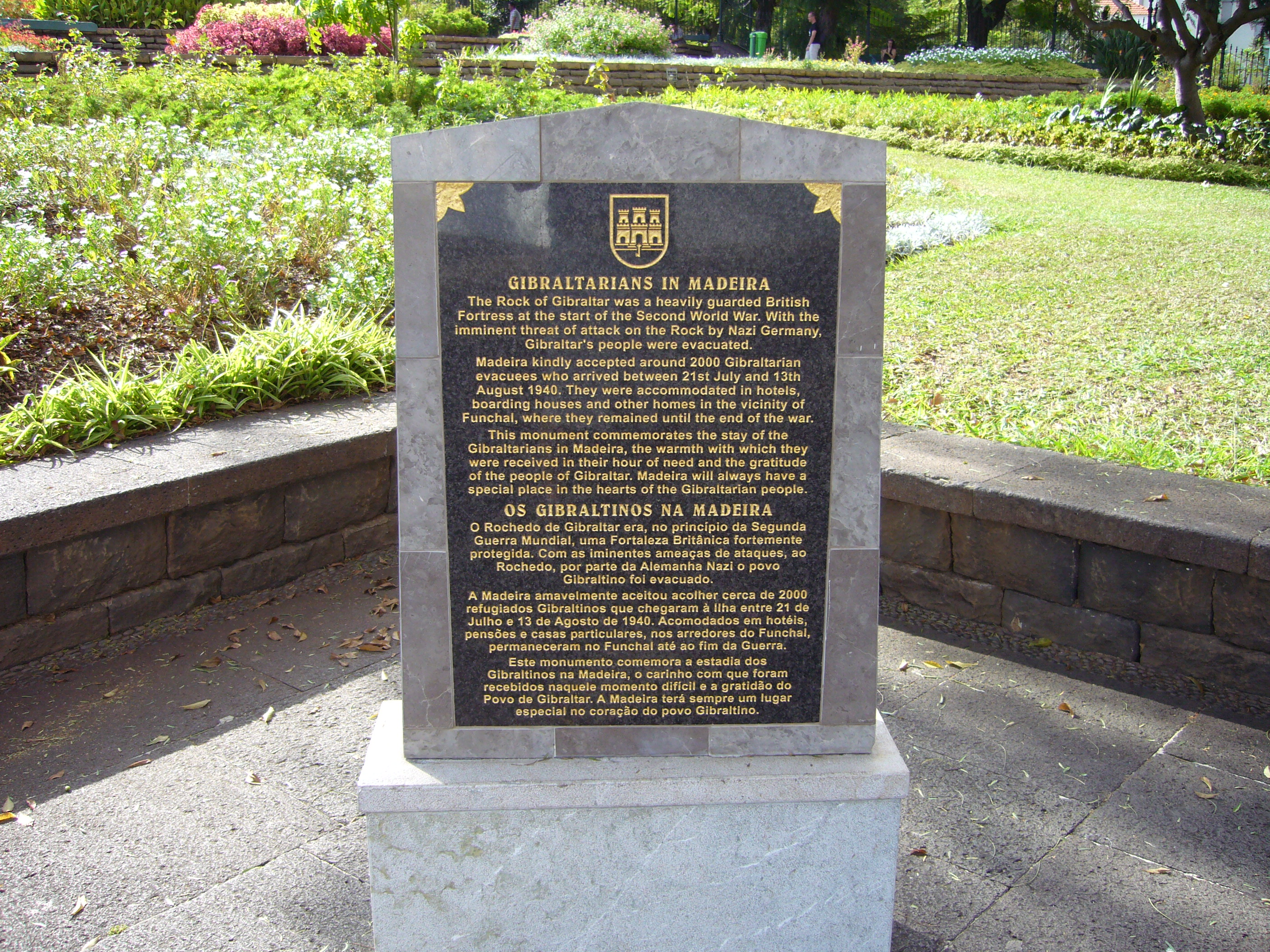
Monument to remember the Gibraltarian evacuees in Madeira

The surrender of Italy in September 1943 lifted any possible objections to the return of the evacuees to the Rock. As a result, a Resettlement Board was established in November, and at a meeting of the Board on 8 February 1944 repatriation priorities were finally agreed. On 6 April 1944 the first group of 1,367 repatriates arrived on the Rock directly from the United Kingdom and on 28 May, the first repatriation party left Madeira, and by the end of 1944 only 520 non-priority evacuees remained on the island.

In London, home-comers were making claims on the evacuees' wartime accommodation and 500 Gibraltarians were re-evacuated to Scotland and 3,000 to camps in Northern Ireland. Although the governor, Lt. General Sir Noel Mason-MacFarlane, fought valiantly on behalf of the evacuees and did not accept the lack of accommodation as a sufficient reason for the delays. As late as 1947 there were still 2,000 in Northern Irish camps. The last of the evacuees did not see the Rock again until 1951.

== Notes ==
ILater President of the United States of America.

IIOriginally the Artificer Company during the Great Siege of Gibraltar (1779–1783).

IIIBritish admiral Andrew Cunningham, 1st Viscount Cunningham of Hyndhope led naval forces in several critical Mediterranean naval battles as Commander-in-Chief. These included the attack on Taranto in 1940, the first carrier-based air attack in history and the Battle of Cape Matapan in 1941.

== See also ==
- Military history of the British Commonwealth in the Second World War
- Spain during World War II
