= Lord Airey's Battery =

Artillery battery in Gibraltar

- Part of Fortifications of Gibraltar
- Upper Rock Nature Reserve, Gibraltar
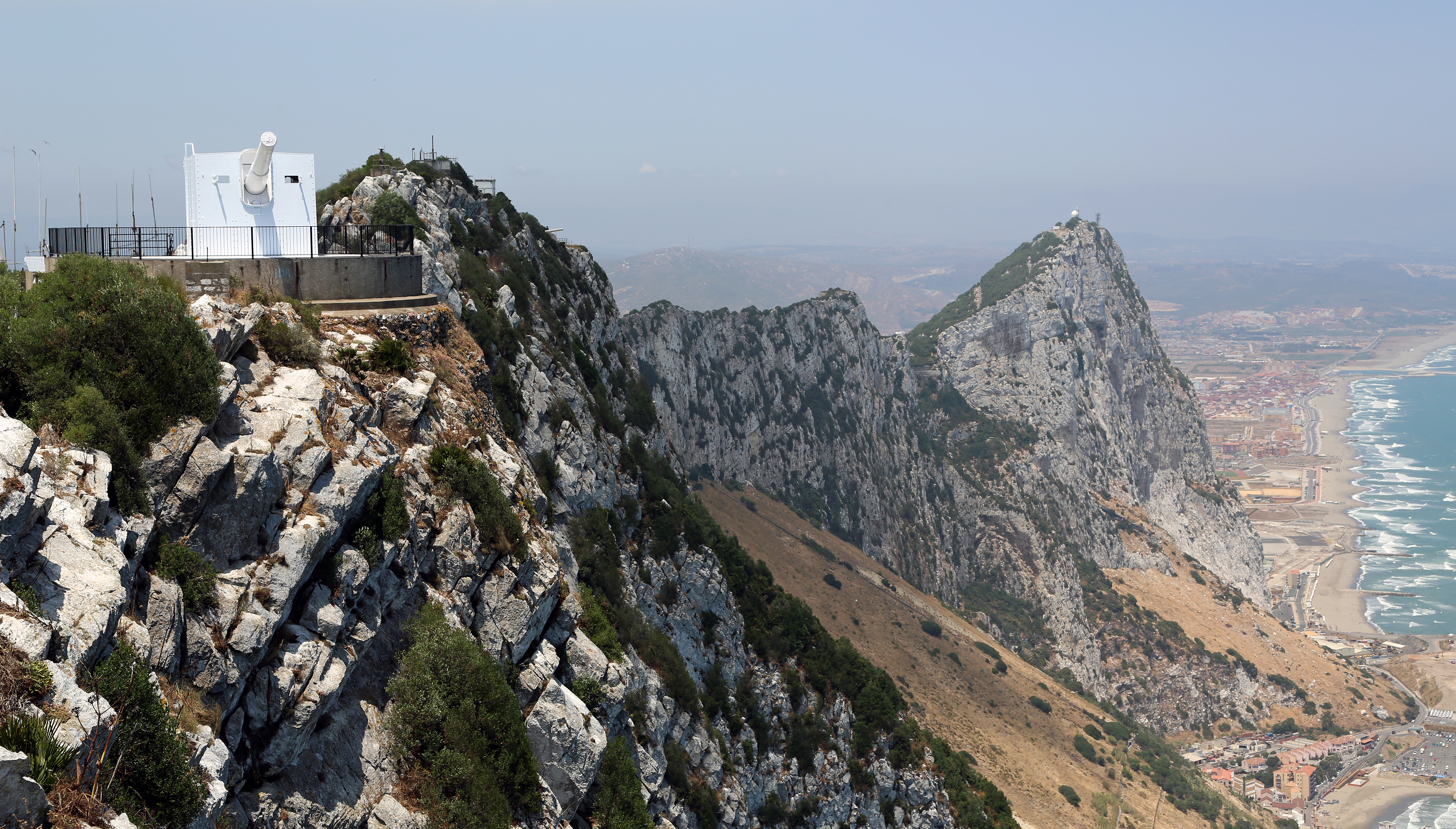
- O'Hara's Battery (foreground, left) and Lord Airey's Battery (gun barrel showing midground, left)

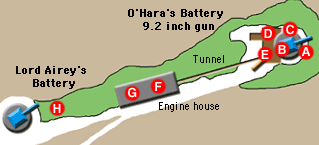
- Map of O'Hara's Battery (A-E), Engine Room (F), Equipment Exhibit (G), and Lord Airey's Battery (H)

Site information
- Type: Artillery battery
- Owner: Government of Gibraltar
- Open to the public: Yes

Location
- Location of Lord Airey's Battery in Gibraltar
- Coordinates: 36.124784°N 5.343277°W

Site history
- Built: 1890-1891

Lord Airey's Battery is an artillery battery in the British Overseas Territory of Gibraltar. It is located near the southern end of the Upper Rock Nature Reserve, just north of O'Hara's Battery. It was named after the Governor of Gibraltar, General Sir Richard Airey. Construction of the battery was completed in 1891. The first gun mounted on the battery was a 6-inch breech loading gun, which was replaced with a 9.2-inch Mark X BL gun by 1900. The gun at the battery was last fired in the 1970s. In 1997, it was discovered that Lord Airey's Shelter, adjacent to Lord Airey's Battery, was the site chosen for a covert World War II operation that entailed construction of a cave complex in the Rock of Gibraltar, to serve as an observation post. The battery is listed with the Gibraltar Heritage Trust.

== Early history ==
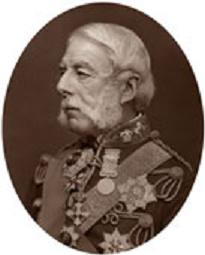
Richard Airey, 1st Baron Airey

Lord Airey's Battery is in Gibraltar, the British Overseas Territory at the southern end of the Iberian Peninsula. The artillery battery is located near the southern end of the Upper Rock Nature Reserve, in the Upper Battery area, which also includes O'Hara's Battery and Spur Battery, although the latter's gun was removed in Project Vitello. It is positioned on O'Hara's Road, just north of O'Hara's Battery. The gun is at an elevation of 418 metres.

The battery was named after General Sir Richard Airey (1803 – 1881), who served as Governor of Gibraltar from 1865 to 1870. Earlier, during the Crimean War, he had served in the capacity of quartermaster-general to FitzRoy Somerset, 1st Baron Raglan. While Airey was regarded very favourably by his superiors, including Lord Raglan, public perception was that he was one of those responsible for the inadequate provisions during that war, as well as the disastrous Charge of the Light Brigade. Upon his return to England, he insisted that an investigation be conducted, and he was exonerated of all charges. Airey achieved the full rank of General in 1871 and led the Airey commission on army reform in 1879-1880.

Construction of Lord Airey's Battery started on 25 July 1890 and was finished by 1 March 1891. The first gun on the battery was a 6-inch breech loading gun with a Vavasseur mounting on a centre pivot. However, on 23 October 1897, the process of creating a position for a 9.2-inch Mark X BL gun on a Mark V mounting began. That was finished on 31 March 1900. Its sister battery, O'Hara's Battery, was also armed with a 9.2-inch gun.

== Operation Tracer ==
The tunnel system of Lord Airey's Shelter, just north of Lord Airey's Battery, was the site chosen for World War II's Operation Tracer. The secret complex came to be known as Stay Behind Cave. The plan had involved sealing half a dozen men into a secret complex in the Rock of Gibraltar if Gibraltar was captured by the Germans. The men were expected to observe and report the activities of the German forces for about a year, sending radio messages. Two observation posts would allow the men to watch the Mediterranean and the Bay of Gibraltar. The facilities included a bicycle to generate electricity and a 10,000 gallon water tank. A section of the floor near the entrance had been prepared with layers of loose bricks to facilitate burial should any of the men die during their confinement. The long-sought-after site was discovered in December 1997 by the Gibraltar Caving Group close to Lord Airey's Battery.

The secret chamber had been constructed in 1941, at which time it was known as Braithwaite's Cave, in honor of Major J. A. Braithwaite, the commanding officer who led the team that constructed the complex. In 1998, one of the men involved in the construction of Stay Behind Cave, Dennis Woods, came forward and confirmed its authenticity. In 2006, the only living member of the 6-man team that had been chosen for Operation Tracer was interviewed. He was 92-year-old Dr. Bruce Cooper, a retired Surgeon Lieutenant of the Royal Navy Volunteer Reserve. His visit to Gibraltar two years later, in 2008, was covered in one of the documentaries (link to a documentary below) about Operation Tracer and included a trip to Stay Behind Cave. The 94-year-old Cooper confirmed that the chamber in question was the secret complex of Operation Tracer. The survival manual for Stay Behind Cave has not yet been retrieved.

== Recent history ==
The 9.2-inch guns at Lord Airey's Battery and O'Hara's Battery were last fired on 7 April 1976 during a training exercise. For years, the site was classified as an excluded area, where entry was a criminal offence. However, in the summer of 2009, soldiers refurbished the guns at Lord Airey's Battery and O'Hara's Battery. Lord Airey's was opened to the public in May 2010, at the same time that O'Hara's Battery became accessible. The battery is under the supervision of the Gibraltar Tourist Board, but managed on a day-to-day basis by a private company. Lord Airey's Battery is one of three surviving 9.2 inch gun emplacements at the upper ridge of the Rock, the others being O'Hara's Battery and Breakneck Battery, the latter on Ministry of Defence property. Lord Airey's Battery is listed with the Gibraltar Heritage Trust.

== Gallery ==
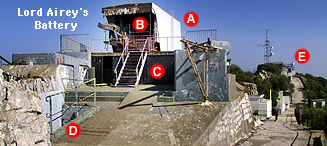
Exterior (A), Gun (B), Mounting (C), Underground complex (D), O'Hara's Battery (E)

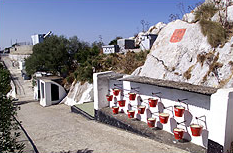
Path from O'Hara's Battery to Lord Airey's Battery
at top left

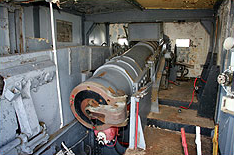
Lord Airey's Battery: 9.2-inch breech-loading gun in 2003

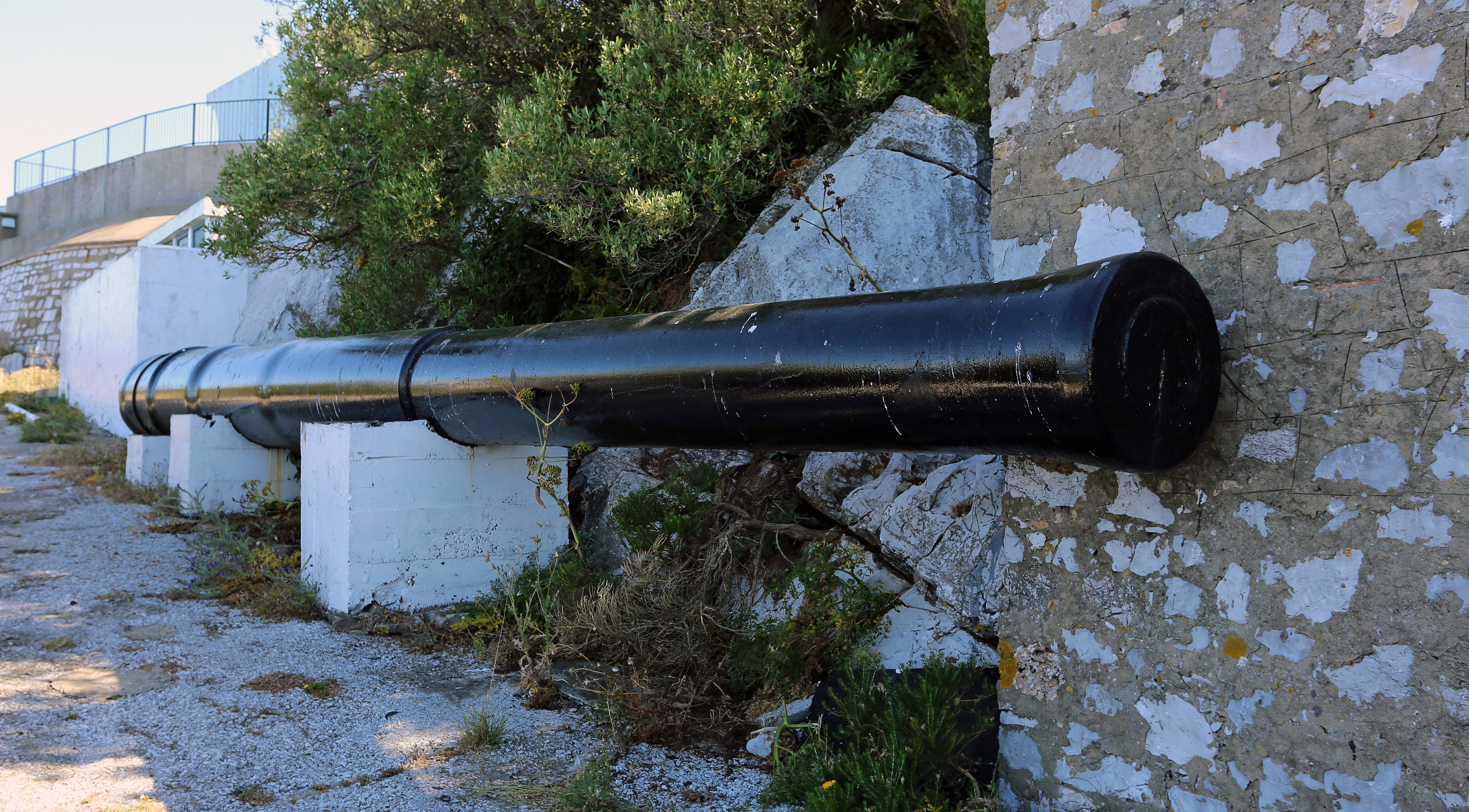
Spare gun barrel between Lord Airey's and O'Hara's Battery

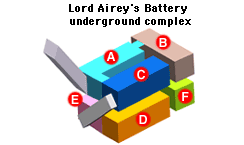
Underground Complex: Tools (A), Hoist (B and F), Hydraulic (C), Cartridges (D), Shells (E)

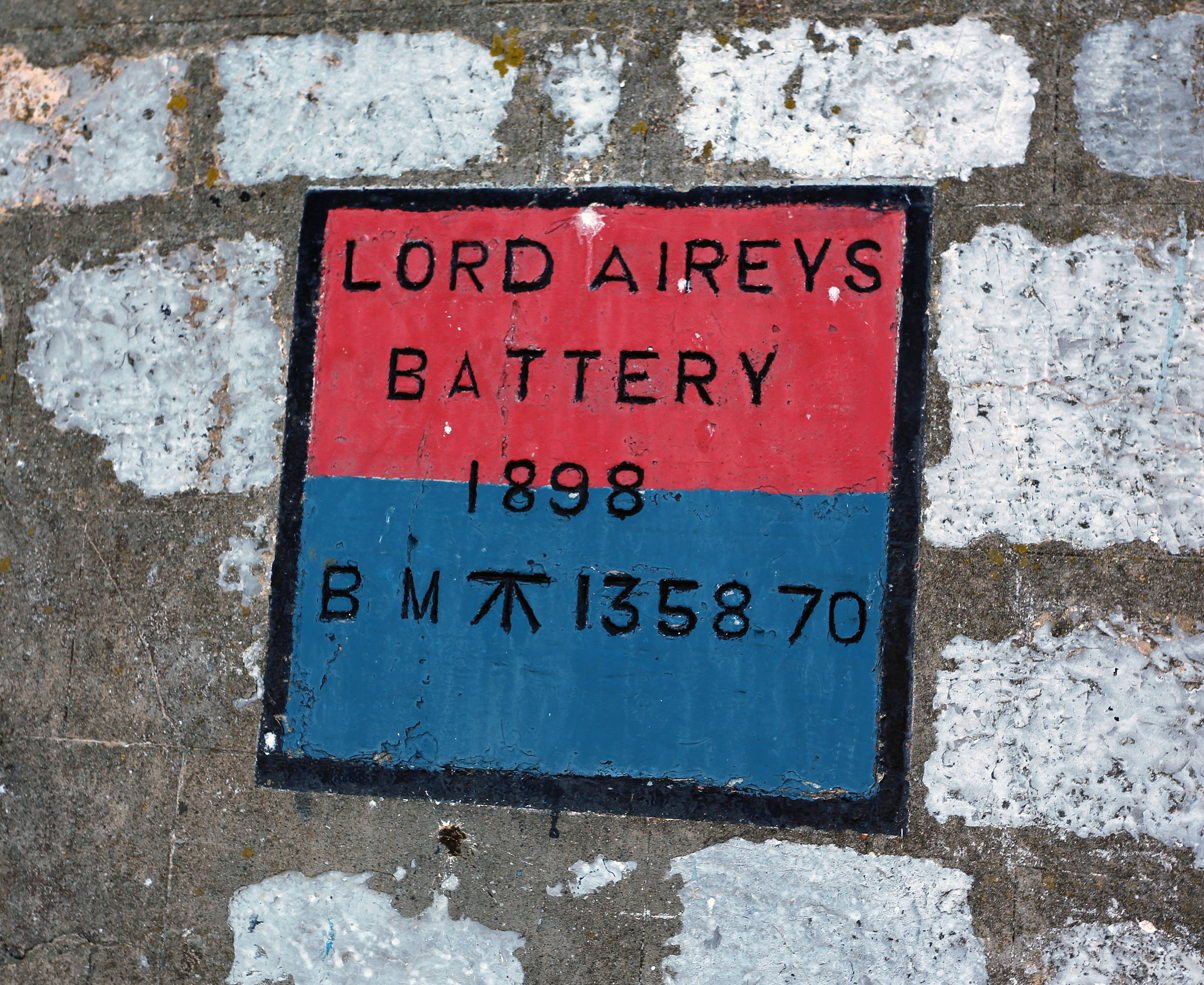
... and it says "Lord_Airey's_Battery"
