= Coptic Cave =

Sea cave in the British Overseas Territory of Gibraltar

Coordinates: 36°07′05″N 5°20′32″W

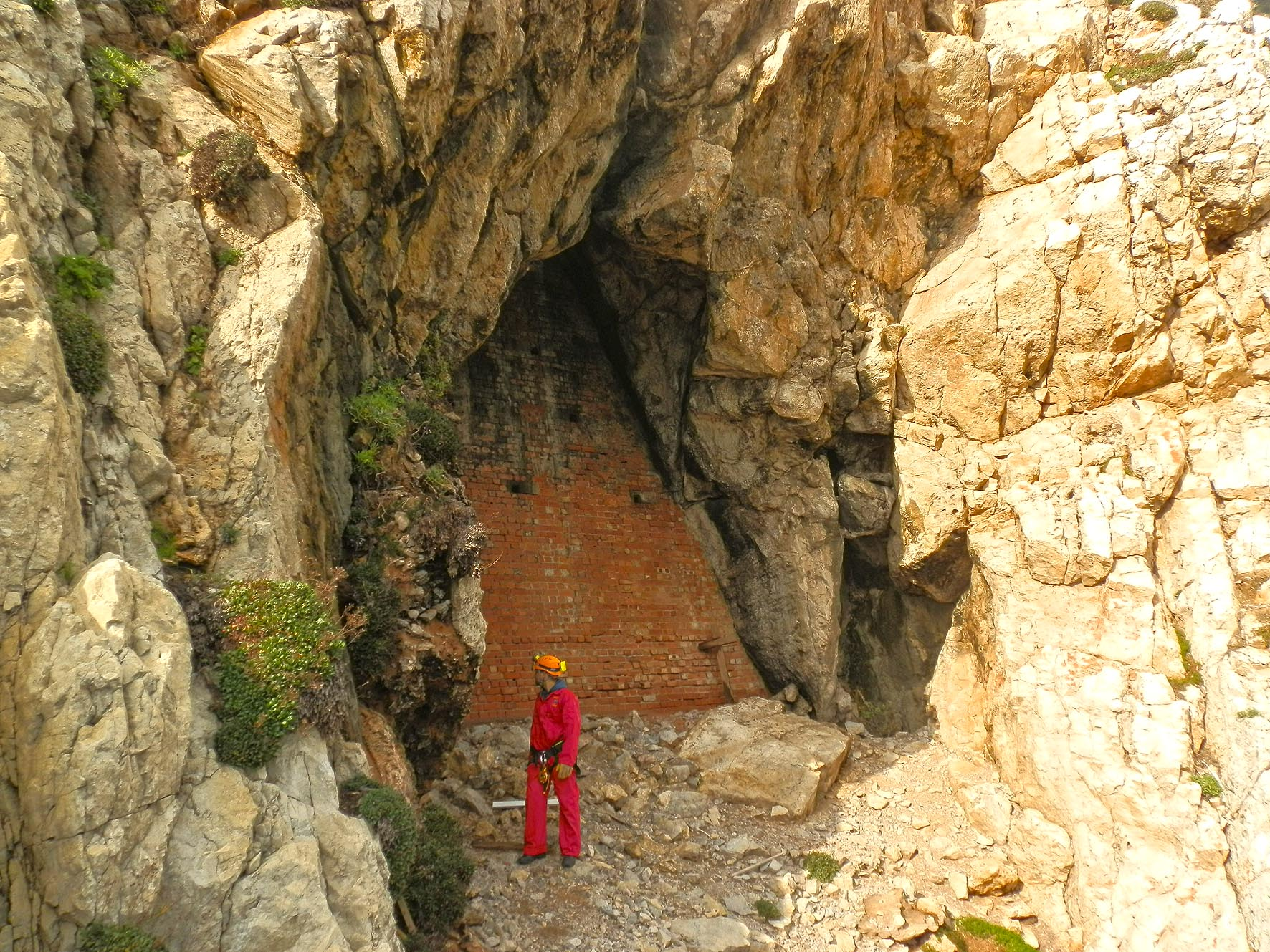
- Entrance to the cave
- Interactive map of Coptic Cave
- Location: Rock of Gibraltar, Gibraltar
- Coordinates: 36.1180
- Depth: 14.8 m
- Geology: Limestone
- Entrances: 2
- Access: by request

Coptic Cave is a sea cave in the British Overseas Territory of Gibraltar. The cave was intended to be used as a decoy to protect Operation Tracer. This was a plan to leave behind spies should the British lose control of the Rock of Gibraltar in World War II.

== History ==
The eight meter high cave was named after a lamp that was discovered in 1937 which was mistakenly thought to be of Coptic origin. The lamp is now thought to be Roman and to have been brought to Gibraltar by Vandals or Byzantines.

During World War II this cave and Beefsteak Cave were chosen to be part of Operation Monkey which created two decoy caves. These caves were intended to deflect any investigation by invaders of Gibraltar who were looking for spies left behind by the British. The real plan to leave behind spies in a cave was called Operation Tracer and the existence of this plan was no more than a rumour until the cave was discovered in 1997 by the Gibraltar Caving Group. They had ignored the rumour that Coptic Cave was involved as they argued correctly that the location would have to be in a place from where both sides of Gibraltar could be observed.

The back of Coptic Cave is nearly 15 metres from the entrance. A shaft was created at the back of the cave which was intended as an escape route and for the delivery of materials via a wooden ladder. The cave had a brick wall constructed which is still extant that closed off the entrance and a man made roof was constructed of corrugated sheets on a timber frame but this has now collapsed.

== Geography ==
Gibraltar is sometimes referred to as the "Hill of Caves" and the geological formation of all the caves is limestone.
