= Beefsteak Cave =

Cave in the British Overseas Territory of Gibraltar

- Location within Gibraltar
- Coordinates: 36°06′46.0″N 5°20′44.2″W

Beefsteak Cave is a cave in the British Overseas Territory of Gibraltar. It is located in the south of the Rock, between Europa Point and Windmill Hill.

== History ==
During the three-and-a-half-year-long Great Siege of Gibraltar the population of the Rock made use of the caves to shelter from the bombardment. This cave was used by Gibraltarians whilst Poca Roca Cave was prepared for use by the Governor of Gibraltar (but never used).

During World War II this cave and Coptic Cave were chosen to be part of Operation Monkey which created two decoy caves. These caves were intended to deflect any investigation by invaders of Gibraltar who were looking for spies left behind by the British. The real plan to leave behind spies in a cave was called Operation Tracer and the existence of this plan was no more than a rumour until the cave was discovered in 1997 by the Gibraltar Caving Group.
