= Lord Airey's Shelter =

Subterranean military shelter in the British Overseas Territory of Gibraltar

- Part of Fortifications of Gibraltar
- Upper Rock Nature Reserve, Gibraltar
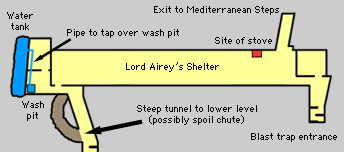
- Lord Airey's Shelter in Gibraltar. North is to the left

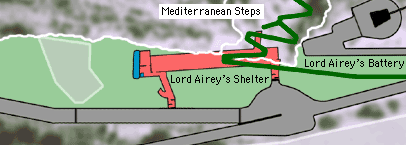
- Map of Lord Airey's Shelter and Lord Airey's Battery in Gibraltar. Mediterranean Steps depicted in green. North is to the left

Site information
- Type: Shelter
- Owner: Ministry of Defence
- Open to the public: No

Location
- Location of Lord Airey's Shelter in Gibraltar
- Coordinates: 36.125119°N 5.343553°W

Site history
- Built: Before Second World War

Lord Airey's Shelter is a subterranean military shelter in the British Overseas Territory of Gibraltar. It is located near the southern end of the Upper Rock Nature Reserve, adjacent to Lord Airey's Battery. It was named after the Governor of Gibraltar, General Sir Richard Airey. The tunnel system for the shelter was chosen as the site for the highly classified, Second World War military operation known as Operation Tracer.

== Early history ==
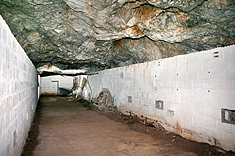
Interior, main room, Lord Airey's Shelter. View toward water tank end of shelter

Lord Airey's Shelter is in Gibraltar, the British Overseas Territory at the southern end of the Iberian Peninsula. The shelter is located underground, near the southern end of the Upper Rock Nature Reserve, just north of Lord Airey's Battery, and adjacent to the Mediterranean Steps. It is positioned on Ministry of Defence property.

The shelter was named after General Sir Richard Airey (1803 – 1881), who served as Governor of Gibraltar from 1865 to 1870. The tunnels for Lord's Airey's Shelter were chosen as the site for the highly classified underground complex of Operation Tracer. The primary room of Lord Airey's Shelter measured 112 feet (34 m) in length and 15 feet (4.6 m) in width. Little is known about its function. However, due to the similarities between Lord Airey's Shelter and Operation Tracer's Stay Behind Cave, it is believed that the shelter may have served as a training site for the members of Operation Tracer. In addition, it may have stored provisions in advance of the military operation. Near the south end of the room, on the east wall, a stove was positioned. Adjacent to this, an exit to the Mediterranean Steps was constructed. On the west side of the south end of the shelter, a passage communicated with the tunnel system.

At the north end of the main room, two smaller chambers were built, one of which contained a wash pit. That pit was built to the same dimensions as the one discovered in Operation Tracer's Stay Behind Cave. A ventilation conduit was installed in that chamber, with an appearance similar to that of the one for Operation Tracer. At the north end of the complex, a second passage led to the main tunnel system, as well as a steep tunnel. That steep tunnel to a lower level may have functioned as a "spoil chute." During the Second World War, it is generally thought that German spies observed the amount of garbage and construction debris removed from the Rock of Gibraltar at a variety of sites. It allowed German authorities to assess the amount of ongoing tunneling in the Rock. In addition, the amount of tunneling in the area of Lord Airey's Shelter during the Second World War may have served as cover while Operation Tracer's Stay Behind Cave was built.

Another operation was codenamed Monkey and its intention was to create decoy caves that could be discovered by an invading army. The chosen locations were Beefsteak Cave and Coptic Cave.

== Recent history ==
As Lord Airey's Shelter is on Ministry of Defence property, it is closed to the public. Unauthorised entry is considered a criminal offence. However, the adjacent Lord Airey's Battery was opened to the public in May 2010.
