= The Ice People (Gee novel) =

1998 science fiction novel by Maggie Gee

- First edition (publ. Metro Books)
- Author: Maggie Gee
- Language: English
- Publication date: 1998

The Ice People is a 1998 science fiction novel by British writer Maggie Gee, set in a future world dominated by a new ice age. The novel examines different elements of contemporary society: the fundamental roles and relationships of men and women, sexuality, politics and the issue of global warming.

Global warming is the initial context, where increases in temperature are then followed by the cyclic appearance of an ice age. The reaction of society and individuals to these dramatic extremes sites the novel within the genre of dystopian science fiction, but closer to the author's heart seem to be the changes within such a scenario of issues we face today: the changes in racism as different parts of the planet change in their attractiveness; the changes in social position as "Insiders" and "Outsiders" – the "haves" and the "have-nots" – live within differing conditions; the value, status and interpretation of marriage; parenthood – the increasing difficulties in conception and the subsequent single-parenthood versus family issues; the "gang" mentality of men and women; the way politics is perceived, used and power abused.

The Ice People has been compared to George Orwell’s Nineteen Eighty-Four and Aldous Huxley’s Brave New World.

== Plot ==
At a point towards the end of the 21st century, Britain is in the grip of a new ice age. Men and women are largely living separately in different areas of the country, while civilisation and law and order have mostly broken down.

As an old man living with a group of outlaws who will dispose of him once he has outlived his usefulness to them, Saul begins to tell the tale of his life, and in particular his marriage to Sarah.

Their marriage is initially a good one, but as the climate changes begin to impact on the surrounding environment, the couple start to cool towards each other and drift apart. Sarah eventually leaves Saul, becomes a political activist, then finally tries to turn their son, Luke, against him.

When Sarah refuses to let him see Luke, Saul kidnaps the boy and goes on the run, fleeing across the English Channel to Europe. Luke objects to being taken away from his home, however, and as Saul attempts to gain passage for them both to the warmer climes of Africa, Luke runs away. It later transpires that he has joined a group of bandits in Spain.

Having lost his son, Saul returns to Britain, where he is involved in a car crash. He is pulled from the wreckage by the outlaws, who at first plan to kill him, but then decide to keep him alive when they discover his skills as a storyteller.

Towards the end, the outlaws are becoming tired of Saul and his time is running out.

== See also ==
- Global warming in popular culture
- Global cooling
- Snowball Earth
