= The White Family =

2002 novel by Maggie Gee

- First edition
- Author: Maggie Gee
- Cover artist: Robert Taylor
- Language: English
- Publisher: Saqi Books
- Publication date: 2002
- Publication place: United Kingdom
- Media type: Print
- Pages: 416
- ISBN: 0-86356-380-5

The White Family is a novel by English author Maggie Gee, published in 2002 in London by Saqi Books. It was shortlisted for both the 2003 Orange Prize and the 2004 International Dublin Literary Award.

== Plot introduction ==
It is set in Hillesden, a thinly disguised Willesden in north-west London. Alfred White, a park keeper, collapses while on duty, and his family gather round his hospital bed and reflect on issues of love, hatred, sex and death.

== Reception ==
- Maya Jaggi in The Guardian writes: "An audacious, groundbreaking condition-of-England novel that delves for the roots of xenophobic hatred and violence in the English hearth" and concludes, "The White Family is finely judged and compulsively readable. Its head-on scrutiny of the uglier face of fair Albion is the more impressive for its rarity in British fiction."
- Hephzibah Anderson in The Observer is more critical: "Gee is unflinching in her exploration of the causes and consequences of racism, but too often she delves beneath the skin of her archetypes to come up with near stereotypes, and for all that it aims at up-to-the-minute, the book remains curiously, naïvely dated. As White Teeth, that other multi-cultural Brent novel, showed, today's racial landscape is coloured less in blacks and whites than myriad shades of grey."

== Sequel ==
Characters in The White Family appear in Gee's 2004 novel The Flood, set in an unspecified future date.
