= Operation Tracer =

Secret Second World War military operation in Gibraltar British Overseas Territory

- Stay Behind Cave
- Part of Military history of Gibraltar during World War II
- Upper Rock Nature Reserve, Gibraltar
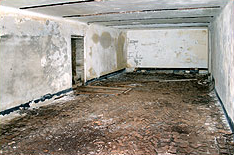
- Main room of Operation Tracer's Stay Behind Cave

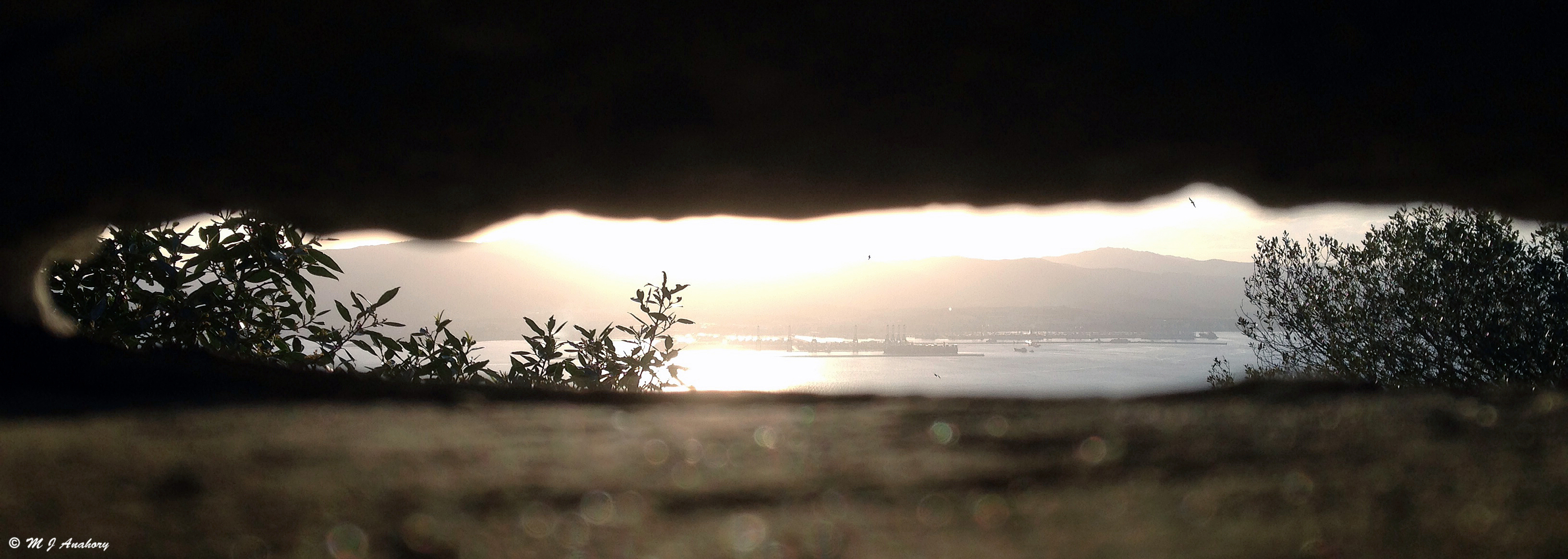
- View over the Bay of Gibraltar through an observation slit at the western observation post of Operation Tracer

Site information
- Controlled by: Ministry of Defence
- Open to the public: No

Location
- Location of Operation Tracer's Stay Behind Cave in Gibraltar, at the tunnel system for Lord Airey's Shelter
- Location within Gibraltar
- Coordinates: 36.1248°N 5.3432°W

Site history
- Built: 1941–1942

Operation Tracer was a secret Second World War Royal Navy military operation in Gibraltar, a British Overseas Territory and military base. The impetus for the stay-behind plan was the 1940 scheme by Germany to capture Gibraltar, code-named Operation Felix. Operation Tracer was the brainchild of Rear Admiral John Henry Godfrey, the Director of the Naval Intelligence Division of the Admiralty.

In 1941, Godfrey decided to establish a covert observation post at Gibraltar that would remain operational even if Gibraltar fell to the Axis powers. Movements of enemy vessels would be reported to the United Kingdom. Godfrey requested the assistance of several distinguished consultants to bring the plan to fruition. The plan was so secret that Godfrey held meetings with his consultants at his private residence rather than at Whitehall.

The decision was made to construct the post using the tunnel system for Lord Airey's Shelter, the underground military headquarters just north of Lord Airey's Battery. The artillery battery was located at the upper ridge of the Rock of Gibraltar, near the southern end of what is now the Upper Rock Nature Reserve.

Construction began in late 1941 and was completed by the late summer of 1942. The chambers served as a dual observation post, with an observation slit overlooking the Bay of Gibraltar and a larger aperture over the Mediterranean Sea. Six men were selected for the operation: an executive officer as leader, two physicians, and three wireless operators. The men had volunteered to be sealed inside the cave should Gibraltar fall to a foreign power.

The men understood that they would remain sealed in the cave for about a year, although it could be much longer, and provisions for a seven-year stay were stored. The plan was aborted, and the Director of Naval Intelligence ordered that the provisions in the complex be distributed and the cave sealed. Rumours of a secret complex, eventually dubbed Stay Behind Cave, circulated for decades in Gibraltar, until discovery of the chambers in 1997 by the Gibraltar Caving Group. The authenticity of the site was confirmed by one of the builders in 1998 and a decade later by one of the physicians, the last surviving member of the Tracer team, who died in 2010.

== Early history ==
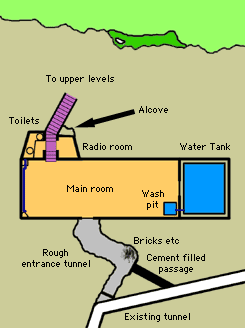
Map of Operation Tracer's Stay Behind Cave, lower level. North is to the left.

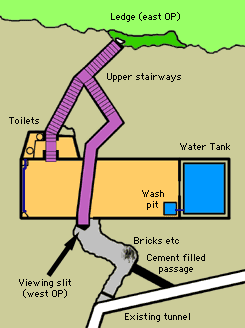
Map of Operation Tracer's Stay Behind Cave, upper level. North is to the left.

Operation Tracer was based in Gibraltar, the British territory and then fortress at the southern end of the Iberian Peninsula. The facility that was constructed for the top secret, World War II military operation was located near the southern end of the Upper Rock Nature Reserve, in close proximity to Lord Airey's Battery.

The impetus for Operation Tracer was a 1940 plan by Germany to move through Spain and capture Gibraltar in the scheme code-named Operation Felix. It was an offshoot of a larger scheme, entitled the Peripheral Strategy, in which Germany planned to cut Great Britain off from the rest of the British Empire. British Intelligence recognised the threat, and Operation Tracer was the result. In the summer of 1941, Rear Admiral John Henry Godfrey (1888–1971), the Director of the Naval Intelligence Division of the British Admiralty, decided to establish at Gibraltar a covert observation post which would remain operational even if Gibraltar fell into enemy hands. The scheme was sufficiently top secret that none of the Operation Tracer meetings took place at Whitehall. Rather, they were held at Godfrey's residence at 36 Curzon Street, Mayfair, Central London.

From the observation post in Gibraltar, soldiers sealed inside the cave would report movements of enemy vessels to the Admiralty, using clandestine Wireless communication. British officers, including Commander Geoffrey Birley and chief engineer Colonel Fordham, performed reconnaissance of the Rock of Gibraltar and selected the existing tunnel system for Lord Airey's Shelter as the site of Operation Tracer. Initially, plans were made to provide a year's worth of accommodation for five men, including food, water, sanitation, and wireless communication. The scheme was later changed to one which would support six men. Eventually, provisions for seven years were supplied. The Director of Naval Intelligence (DNI) consulted with several experts on the feasibility and requirements of the scheme.

By late December 1941, construction of the complex had commenced. The tunnelling work was performed in secret and the labourers were unaware of the exact site. All those involved in the construction of the Operation Tracer facility were immediately returned to England when it was completed, out of concern that they might leak the plan. The room which would provide the living quarters for the men was 5,760 cubic feet (163 m^{3}), with dimensions of 45 ft x 16 ft x 8 ft (14 m x 4.8 m x 2.4 m), at an elevation of 1,350 feet (410 m). The two observation apertures, one west over the Bay of Gibraltar, and the other east over the Mediterranean, provided ventilation. Each opening was initially planned to be 12 inches x 6 inches (30 cm x 15 cm). In addition, there was a 10,000-imperial-gallon (45,000 L) water tank. Toilets were adjacent to a small radio room that contained the equipment for the wireless communications, which included a Mark 3 transmitter and HRO Receiver. Three 12 volt, 120 ampere batteries would be charged with either one of two generators, one bicycle-propelled and the other hand-cranked. The bicycle, which also drove a ventilation system, had its chain replaced with a leather strap, in order to minimise the noise when it was in use. In addition, an outside aerial was recommended. A rod aerial measuring 18 feet (5.5 m) in length would be inserted through the east observation aperture.

A staircase near the main chamber, at the level of the radio room and toilet facility, led up to the east observation post. It was decided that the aerial would be hidden by withdrawing it into a pipe after use, with the pipe extending down the stairs which led to the main room. While it had initially been planned that the observation apertures would both be slits, the final choice was for the eastern aperture over the Mediterranean to be larger, overlooking a narrow ledge, yet still completely concealed. The opening and ledge were sufficiently large that a man could climb out onto the platform for fresh air. Part way up the main set of stairs was another set which led to the west observation post. The western slit over the bay was concealed with a concrete wedge. The entirety of the main chamber had been plastered and its floor covered in cork tiles, both methods to reduce sound transmission. The entrance passage had loose soil, to facilitate burials if needed. It also had loose bricks to further brick up the tunnel access once the six men had been sealed inside the cave.

At a January 1942 meeting, a report by two of the consultants was analysed. The report made suggestions as to personnel, exercise, provisions, including food, alcohol and tobacco, ventilation, and sanitation. If one of the team members died, it was recommended that their remains be embalmed and cemented. Those at the meeting decided that the Operation Tracer team should have six members: an officer who would serve as leader of the team, two doctors, and three telegraphists. It was proposed that a rehearsal be conducted to evaluate the psychological suitability of the proposed team members. It was suggested that the rehearsal take place in Scotland. At a meeting held the following month, in February 1942, it was recommended that Lieutenant White of the Royal Naval Volunteer Reserve be interviewed. It was proposed that once the Tracer team was chosen, a second team be organised, and observations posts at other places such as Aden and Malta be considered.

On 13 April 1942, Godfrey released a memo, the fourth paragraph of which stated:

4. Now that TRACER is fairly launched, I should like Cdr. Scott to adopt it and take it over as soon as possible, but he will certainly need help from Fleming and Merrett for some time to come. This again, especially the assembly of the actual stores and the selection of a Signalman is to be treated as a matter of primary importance and a progress report submitted to me on the 24th April.

Edward Merrett served as Godfrey's secretary. Writer Ian Fleming, of James Bond fame, was his personal assistant. Both were involved in Operation Tracer.

== Mastermind ==
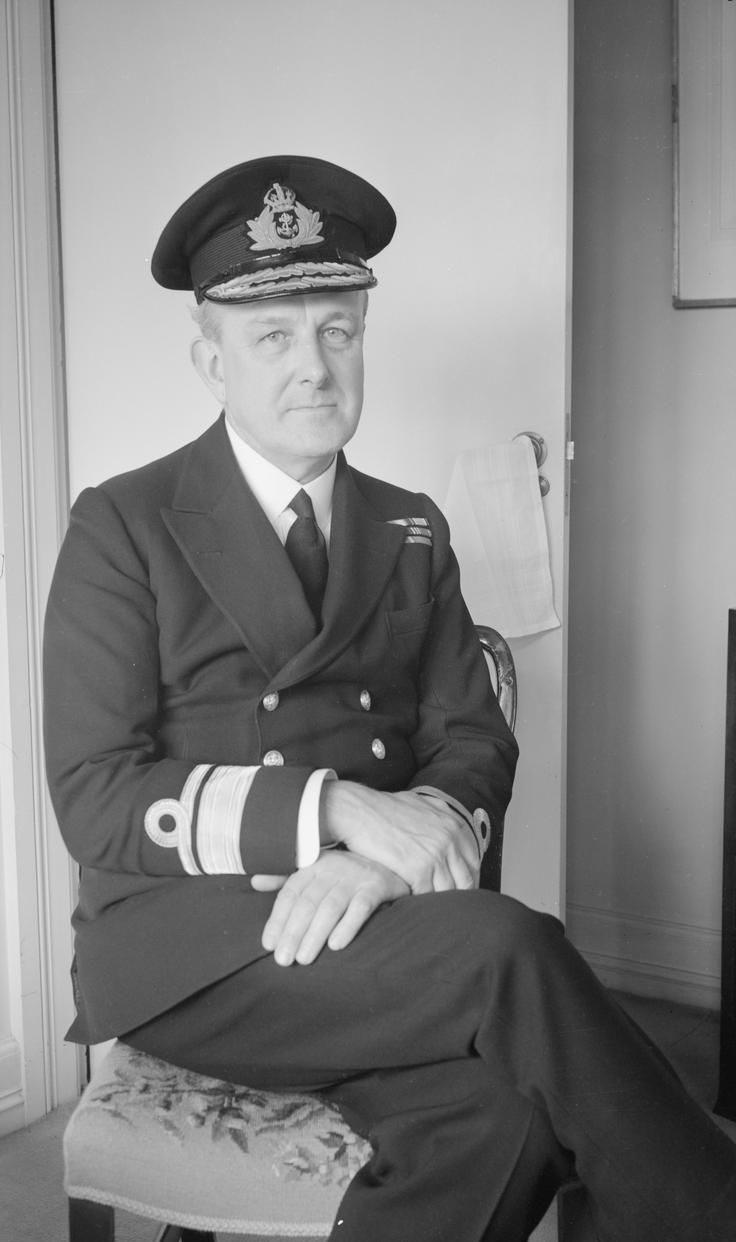
Rear Admiral John Henry Godfrey, mastermind of Tracer

John Henry Godfrey was a native of Handsworth, Birmingham, England. He matriculated at Bradfield College and in 1903 began his naval career as a cadet aboard HMS Britannia, formerly HMS Prince of Wales. After a series of postings and promotions, he became a lieutenant commander in 1916. Aside from being mentioned in dispatches, Godfrey earned the Legion of Honour (Chevalier) and the Order of the Nile. He was promoted to commander in 1920 and captain in 1928 and after additional postings and commands, he commanded HMS Repulse from 1936 until 1938. Godfrey was promoted to rear admiral and appointed Director of Naval Intelligence in 1939; he was also awarded Companion of the Order of the Bath that year and was promoted to vice admiral in 1942. There is some disagreement as to whether Godfrey was dismissed as DNI in 1942 or 1943. Godfrey commanded the Royal Indian Navy from February 1943. Although he was promoted to admiral in 1945, he served in his former rank until March 1946. Godfrey retired in September 1946 and died in Eastbourne, England in August 1971. He has been cited as the inspiration for the fictional M, the head of the Secret Intelligence Service in the James Bond novels.

== Consultants ==
One of the consultants for Operation Tracer was Royal Navy Surgeon Commander George Murray Levick (1876–1956). Levick had been part of the support crew for Captain Robert Scott (1868–1912) in Antarctica. Levick and five other men of the crew survived their eight-month trip to Cape Evans, which included an entire winter spent in a snow cave, eating seal blubber and penguin meat. Levick had been called out of retirement to serve as the British Admiralty's consultant on survival in harsh conditions. While it was initially planned for another consultant to search for doctors, it was Levick who recruited the two physicians for Operation Tracer. He made recommendations on psychological vetting of personnel, as well as diet, clothing, exercise, and leisure activity.

Levick also advised on ventilation and sanitation of the cave, including how to handle dead bodies. He drew up reports with recommendations for the operation and attended meetings held by the Director of Naval Intelligence at Curzon Street. He also compiled a comprehensive list of provisions to be assembled within the cave in the Upper Rock. Director Godfrey and his consultants agreed with Levick's recommendation for a rehearsal, although Romney Marsh, England, was chosen, rather than a Scotland location. In addition, Levick lived with the Tracer team during the rehearsal period.

The consultants also included Thomas Horder, 1st Baron Horder (1871–1955), who had been physician to three monarchs, including Edward VII, George VI, and Elizabeth II. Horder served on numerous committees and associations, and was chairman or president of many of them. The Director of Naval Intelligence consulted with Horder on matters of diet and provisions. The January 1942 report was prepared by Horder and Levick, and much of it was based on the latter's experience wintering in the Antarctic snow cave. Horder was also present at the Director's highly classified meetings at Curzon Street.

The MI6 radio consultant was Colonel Richard Gambier-Parry (1894–1965), who supervised the communications aspect of Operation Tracer. He had been recruited by the Secret Intelligence Service (SIS) in 1938, prior to the onset of World War II, to modernise their radio capability. He was promoted to colonel in 1939 and brigadier in 1942. Gambier-Parry continued to run a network of secret listening stations after the war.

== Team ==
By the end of April 1942, five members of the Operation Tracer team had been selected: two surgeon-lieutenants and three signalmen. Surgeon-Lieutenant Bruce Cooper (1914–2010) was recruited by Levick from the Royal Naval Volunteer Reserve during his shore leave in 1941. When Cooper, from Castle Eden, England, was requested to recommend another physician, he suggested Arthur Milner, a civilian doctor in Morecambe. The two physicians were friends and both had obtained their medical degrees from Durham University.

Cooper was told nothing of the secret mission until he agreed to participate in it. Milner was initially hesitant to join the Navy due to his seasickness. However, he was assured that it would never be mandated that he serve at sea. While consideration had been given to rehearsals in Scotland, the team undertook rehearsals at Romney Marsh, southern England, following initial training. Three top signalmen and an executive officer to serve as leader of the team had also been recruited. However, the leader of the team had to be replaced. The officer apparently had balked at the idea of sharing his dining table with the three naval ratings, the enlisted men who were to serve as wireless operators. The names of the three enlisted men who were wireless operators are unknown.

The physicians, Cooper and Milner, the latter having also joined the Royal Naval Volunteer Reserve, arrived in Gibraltar. However, at the time of their arrival, the team was still in need of a leader. The executive officer who replaced the initial choice for leader was "Windy" Gale, a native of Kent.

== Denouement ==
By May 1942, provisions had been prepared at the Admiralty. Arrangements for similar operations in Colombo and Trincomalee commenced. By the beginning of August 1942, a complete Tracer team was in place at Gibraltar, supervised by Commander Pyke-Nott. Each team member was assigned a "job" which provided cover for being in Gibraltar. By the end of the month, construction of the cave was almost complete and all provisions were in place. A manual for Tracers had been printed, ostensibly for an Arctic expedition, and the Director of Naval Intelligence started preparations for a "shadow" Tracer team.

However, Operation Tracer in Gibraltar was never activated. In May 1943 Allied armies completed the capture of North Africa, and on 17 August they drove the last Axis forces out of Sicily, rendering the threat to Gibraltar negligible. On 24 August 1943, the Director of Naval Intelligence sent a highly classified, one-time pad message in which he ordered one last wireless communications exercise, as well as blocking up of the chambers and distribution of the provisions that had been stored there.

The manual for Operation Tracer is at the Naval Intelligence Division, #1001107/42. It elaborates on the selection of personnel, as well as heating, lighting, and sanitation. In addition, it has a dozen appendices on food, clothing, utensils, tools, equipment, furniture, cooking, stationery, games, library, sundries, medical stores and surgical instruments. The manual also discusses the challenges encountered in constructing the covert facility.

== Discovery ==
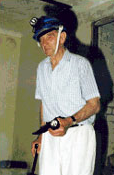
Dennis Woods at Tracer's cave in 1998.

Since World War II, rumours circulated of a secret room in the Rock of Gibraltar. For years, people explored the Rock's cliffs, tunnels, and caves, but to no avail. However, in late 1996, after searching for more than two years as a team, the Gibraltar Caving Group unearthed a secret complex in close proximity to Lord Airey's Battery at the Upper Ridge of the southern end of the Upper Rock Nature Reserve. The group had evaluated potential locations of the complex, and come to the conclusion that it had to be located high up on the Rock in order to command good views of both the Mediterranean and the Bay of Gibraltar.

Their suspicions were raised when members of the group felt a rush of wind in a tunnel they had been exploring. After further exploration, the group broke through a wall into a series of chambers. It was quickly recognised that the secret complex was likely the long-sought-after site of Operation Tracer. The hidden chamber had been dubbed "Stay Behind Cave" by locals years ago, before official details were known.

After feeling the draught of wind in the tunnel on a levanter day in December 1997, the Gibraltar Caving Group had pushed aside some corrugated metal sheets, and found a bricked-in area of the wall. Carefully removing some bricks, they soon revealed a doorway behind the bricked-in area of the tunnel. In addition to the observations posts, including a concrete slab for that on the west, the men found the remains of a bicycle. They also located the tubing which sheathed the aerial rod along the stairs. Cork tiles on the floor provided insulation for purposes of both warmth and sound. They were in two patterns and shapes: square tiles arranged around the periphery of the room, presumably to indicate storage areas, and narrow tiles in a herringbone pattern in the main area of the room centrally.

During the course of a 28-minute documentary that was filmed and produced in 1998, the team turned on the brass tap over the wash pit supplied by the 10,000 gallon water tank. The water, while initially black, soon ran clear. The men kept the location of the cave a secret for three months while they researched it. The documentary, Operation Tracer – Stay Behind Cave, was published in April 2012.

In September 1998, Dennis Woods identified himself as having been instrumental in the construction of the covert facility. His appearance in Gibraltar represented his first return there in more than fifty years. The Gibraltar Museum invited Woods to tour the underground chambers. He revealed that at the time of the construction of the secret complex, it was referred to as Braithwaite's Cave, in honour of the commanding officer. Major J A Braithwaite had led the men who constructed the facility, and died during an accidental explosion while tunnelling. His acknowledgement confirmed the identity of the site. He was able to relate details of the construction and function of elements of the facility.

Woods also indicated that there were two other Tracer teams in Gibraltar, but that his was the main one. This, together with a drawing of a different chamber obtained from an MI6 source, raised the possibility of a second secret complex in Gibraltar. In addition, a former telegraphist suggested that Tracer units were in operation during the course of the Suez Crisis.

== Recent history ==
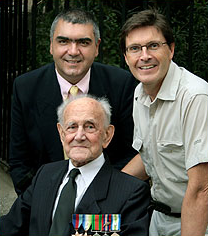
(Clockwise) Bruce Cooper (seated), Martin Nuza, and Jim Crone in Gibraltar, October 2008

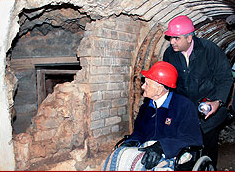
Bruce Cooper (seated) and Martin Nuza at entrance to Operation Tracer's cave

British Naval Intelligence document ADM 223/464 has become available under the Freedom of Information Act. The document, which bears a Top Secret stamp in the upper right hand corner, originated from the National Archives in Kew, London. It provides substantial insight into Operation Tracer and was the work of Charles Langbridge Morgan (1894–1958). The respected author and journalist was employed by the Naval Intelligence Division throughout World War II, first under Godfrey and later under his successor Edmund Rushbrooke.

A native of Bromley in Kent, Morgan wrote his first book, The Gunroom, in 1919. The novel, which detailed the unhappy life of a midshipman in the Royal Navy prior to World War I, was not well received by the Admiralty. While the British Admiralty suppressed the book, it did result in reforms in the Royal Navy. Morgan penned an Intelligence Digest on a weekly basis during World War II. British writer Nicholas Rankin believes him to have been the unofficial historian of the Naval Intelligence Division.

Researchers Sergeant Major Pete Jackson of the Royal Gibraltar Regiment and Jim Crone interviewed retired Surgeon Lieutenant-Commander Bruce Cooper in England in November 2006. During the interview, Cooper related details of his early career, prior to the war. He also described the story of Levick's recruitment of himself and his friend Milner for Operation Tracer, and their "cover" assignments and rehearsals. At the time of that initial interview, he did not recognise maps and photographs of the Tracer complex. However, he admitted that his memory of the facility had faded. Cooper recalled a large water tank, as well as having to pedal a bicycle vigorously to generate power. Additionally, he remembered a west observation slit over the town and Detached Mole and a larger, east observation opening over the Mediterranean, the latter not only for observation, but also to lower an aerial for wireless communication. Cooper also remembered meeting the legendary Buster Crabb during his off-duty hours. He also related details of his life after the war.

In October 2008, Cooper, the last survivor of Operation Tracer, returned to Gibraltar with his family. The team that escorted them to the secret cave complex included Jackson and the Director of the Gibraltar Museum. The event was filmed by Martin Nuza. The retired physician confirmed that the Stay Behind Cave discovered in 1997 was the same covert chamber that had been constructed for his use and that of his five colleagues. During his visit to Gibraltar, Cooper stayed at the Rock Hotel, the same place he had resided more than sixty years earlier when he first arrived for his covert mission. Other events that had been organised for Dr. Cooper and his family that week included a trip on a Gibraltar Squadron patrol boat, a tour of the World War II tunnels, and his guest appearance at the annual Trafalgar Day ceremony at the Trafalgar Cemetery. Cooper also had the opportunity to talk with the commander of the British Forces Gibraltar, Commodore Matt Parr. Surgeon Lieutenant-Commander Bruce Cooper died two years later, shortly after his 96th birthday, on 3 December 2010.

Operation Tracer's Stay Behind Cave has been one of the research projects of the Gibraltar Museum, and is under its supervision. Under the auspices of the Gibraltar Museum, the Gibraltar Caving Group performed a survey of the complex in conjunction with the Spanish organization GIEX, the Speleological Research Group from Jerez. Small groups of visitors may arrange a tour of Stay Behind Cave with the Gibraltar Museum.

The story of Operation Tracer appeared in primetime in 2011 on the daily television programme The One Show that airs on BBC One.

June 2012 marked the visit of Prince Edward, Earl of Wessex and his wife to Gibraltar. Their stay at Gibraltar represented part of the celebrations surrounding the Diamond Jubilee of Elizabeth II. Prince Edward and his wife had the opportunity to visit the Upper Rock and tour Operation Tracer's Stay Behind Cave. The couple also laid the foundation stone of Gibraltar's Diamond Jubilee Monument.

A full-length feature film titled Tracer, to be shot on location in Gibraltar and the Lofoten Islands, is planned. Martin Nuza, of Gold Productions Studios, has formed a partnership with producer James Davidson to develop a film based on the story of Operation Tracer. The suspense and horror film was to be directed by James Isaac. However, the 51-year-old Hollywood director died in May 2012.

== Gallery ==
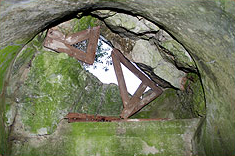
Eastern observation post with pieces of camouflage

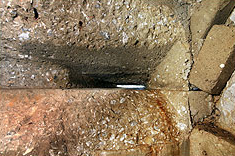
Western observation post with slit

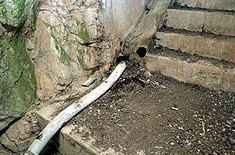
Aerial tube at junction of stairways

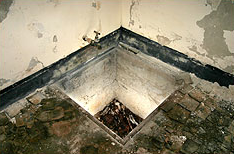
Wash pit and brass tap in main room

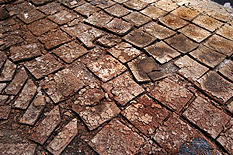
Cork tiles on floor with two shapes and patterns

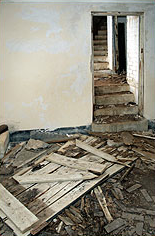
Doorway to staircase and radio and toilet rooms

== See also ==
- Operation Goldeneye
