= Maggie Gee (novelist) =

English novelist (born 1948)

Maggie Mary Gee OBE, FRSL
- Born: 2 November 1948 (age 77); Poole, Dorset, England, UK
- Education: Horsham High School for Girls; Somerville College, Oxford; Wolverhampton Polytechnic (1980)
- Occupation: Novelist
- Spouse: Nicholas Rankin
- Children: Rosa Rankin-Gee
- Writing career
- Notable work: The White Family (2002)
- Notable awards: Granta Best of Young British Novelists (1983)

Maggie Mary Gee (born 2 November 1948) is an English novelist. In 2012, she became a professor of creative writing at Bath Spa University.

Gee was one of six women among the 20 writers on the Granta Best of Young British Novelists list in 1983, which she recalls as "a very good time for fiction." She was the first female chair of the Royal Society of Literature (RSL), 2004–08.

== Life ==
Gee was born in Poole, Dorset. As a child, she lived in the Midlands before moving to Sussex. She was educated at Horsham High School for Girls, won a scholarship to Somerville College, Oxford, where she earned an MA degree in English literature and an MLitt on Surrealism in England. After university, she worked in publishing for two years and then became a research assistant at Wolverhampton Polytechnic, where she completed a Ph.D. in The Self-Conscious Novel from Sterne to Vonnegut. She was chosen as one of the original Granta 20 Best of Young British Novelists in 1983.

Gee is a Fellow of the Royal Society of Literature (FRSL). Her teaching specialty is 20th- and 21st-century fiction.

Gee lived in London with her husband, the writer and broadcaster Nicholas Rankin, and their daughter Rosa Rankin-Gee, who is also a novelist. Gee now lives in Ramsgate.

== Work ==
Gee has published 14 novels; a collection of short stories, and a memoir. Her seventh novel, The White Family, was shortlisted for the 2003 Orange Prize and the International Dublin Literary Award. The first book-length study of her work, Mine Özyurt Kılıç's Maggie Gee: Writing the Condition-of-England Novel, was published in 2013.

Gee writes in a broadly modernist tradition, in that her books have a strong overall sense of pattern and meaning, but her writing style is characterized by political and social awareness. She turns a satirical eye on contemporary society but is affectionate towards her characters and has an unironic sense of the beauty of the natural world. Her human beings are biological as well as social creatures partly because of the influence of science and in particular evolutionary biology on her thinking. Where Are the Snows (first published in 1991), The Ice People (1998) and The Flood (2004) have all dealt with the near or distant future. She writes through male characters as often as she does through female characters.

The individual human concerns that her stories address include the difficulties of resolving the conflict between total unselfishness, which often leads to secret unhappiness and resentment against the beneficiaries; and selfishness, which in turn can lead to the unhappiness of others, particularly of children. This is a typical quandary of late 20th- and early 21st-century women, but it is also a concern for privileged, wealthy, long-lived Western human beings as a whole, and widens into global concerns about wealth, poverty, and climate change. Her books also explore how humans as a species relate to non-human animals and the natural world as a whole. Two of her books, The White Family (2002) and My Cleaner (2005), have racism as a central theme, dealt with as a tragedy in The White Family but as a comedy in My Cleaner. In 2009, she published My Driver, a second novel with many of the same characters as My Cleaner, but this time set in Uganda during a time of tension with neighbouring DR Congo.

In 2010, Gee published My Animal Life, a memoir praised by Kathryn Hughes as "absorbing" and about which Michèle Roberts wrote in The Independent: "While chronicling the successes (and pitfalls) of an artist's life, My Animal Life paints a fine, honest, complex portrait of an artist's mind."

Gee is a Vice-President of the Royal Society of Literature and Professor of Creative Writing at Bath Spa University. She has also served on the Society of Authors' management committee and the government's Public Lending Right committee. Literary awards she has judged include the Booker Prize in 1989 and the Wellcome Book Prize in 2010.

In the 2012 New Year Honours, Gee was appointed Officer of the Order of the British Empire (OBE) for services to literature. In 2016, she was elected a non-executive director of the Authors' Licensing and Collecting Society.

== Bibliography ==
- Dying, In Other Words (Harvester, 1981). ISBN 9780710800305
- Anthology of Writing Against War: For Life on Earth (editor) (University of East Anglia, 1982)
- The Burning Book (London: Faber and Faber, 1983). New edition 1985, ISBN 9780571134175
- Light Years (London: Faber and Faber, 1985, re-issued by Flamingo, 1994, and by Telegram, 2005). ISBN 9780863568688
- Grace (London: Heinemann, 1988, ISBN 9780434287468; Telegram, 2009). ISBN 9781846590634
- Where Are the Snows? (London: Heinemann, 1991; re-issued by Telegram, 2005). ISBN 978-1846590016
- Lost Children (London: Flamingo, 1994). ISBN 9780006546870
- The Burning Book (London: Flamingo, 1994). ISBN 978-0006546160
- How May I Speak in My Own Voice? Language and the Forbidden (Birkbeck College: The William Matthews Lecture, 1996). ISBN 9780907904564
- The Ice People (London: Richard Cohen Books, 1998, revised edn, Telegram, 2008). ISBN 9781846591389
- The White Family (London: Telegram, 2002); 20th anniversary edition by Telegram, 2022. ISBN 9781846591372
- Diaspora City: The London New Writing Anthology (contributor) (London: Arcadia Books, 2003). ISBN 9781900850759
- The Flood (London: Telegram, 2004). ISBN 9780863563157
- My Cleaner (London: Telegram, 2005). ISBN 9781846591327
- The Blue (short stories) (London: Telegram, 2006). ISBN 9781846590139
- NW 15: The Anthology of New Writing, co-edited with Bernardine Evaristo (Granta/British Council, 2007). ISBN 9781862079328
- My Driver (Telegram, 2009). ISBN 9781846591334
- My Animal Life: A Memoir. Telegram. 12 August 2011. ISBN 978-1-84659-096-2.
- Virginia Woolf in Manhattan (London: Telegram, 2014). ISBN 9781846591990
- Blood (London: Fentum Press, 2019). ISBN 9781909572126
- Virginia Woolf in Manhattan. Expanded US edition (London and New York: Fentum Press, 2019). ISBN 9781909572102
- The Red Children (London: Telegram, 2022). ISBN 9781846592133
