= New St. Michael's Cave =

Cave in the British Overseas Territory of Gibraltar

- Lower St. Michael's Cave
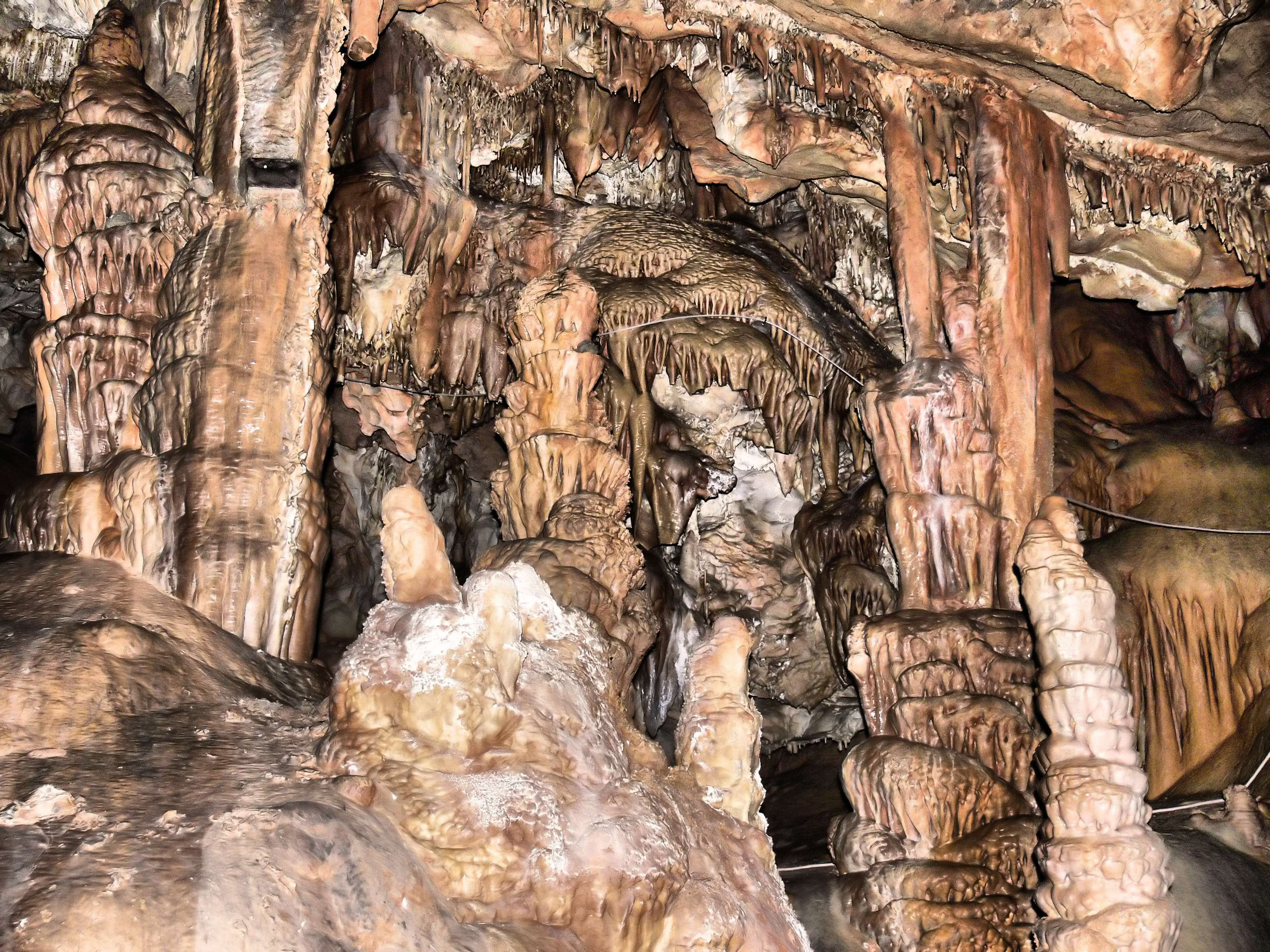
- Various speleothem at New St. Michael's Cave.

- Location within Gibraltar
- Coordinates: 36°07′33.2″N 5°20′45.7″W
- Discovery: 1942
- Geology: Limestone
- Entrances: 1
- Access: Organised tours
- Show cave opened: Yes
- Show cave length: 200 metres (660 ft)
- Lighting: Fully lit
- Features: Almost all known speleothem and lake.

New St. Michael's Cave, also known as Lower St. Michael's Cave, is a cave system in the British Overseas Territory of Gibraltar. Unlike its namesake, St. Michael's Cave (proper), which has been known for over 2,000 years, this cave was discovered as recently as World War II.

The cave was accidentally discovered during World War II, when in 1942 the Royal Engineers were blasting inside the Rock of Gibraltar so as to create an alternate entrance to the lower chambers of St. Michael's Cave, which had been prepared as an emergency hospital. The first sign was when their tunnelling appeared to create no rubble as it had fallen through the newly created opening into this previously undiscovered cave which may have remained sealed for some 20,000 years.

The cave's chambers include examples of almost all known cave formations, including a lake nearly 40 yards (37 m) long containing an estimated 45,000 imperial gallons (200,000 L) of crystal-clear water. After the war, the cave and every visitor was supervised by the United Kingdom's Ministry of Defence, specifically the Royal Engineers. It was not until the 1970s that civilian guides were authorised. Within ten years, the guides were all civilians as the Gibraltar Tourist Board took over the cave's management from the military.

Three-hour guided tours of the cave can be arranged, ending with viewing the underground lake.
