= Dying, In Other Words =

1981 novel by Maggie Gee

- First edition
- Author: Maggie Gee
- Language: English
- Publisher: Harvester Press
- Publication date: 1981
- Publication place: United Kingdom
- Media type: Print
- Pages: 215
- ISBN: 0-71-080030-4

Dying, in Other Words is the debut novel of English author Maggie Gee, variously described as surrealist and modern gothic. It garnered "rave reviews" in The Observer and The Times. According to the OUP's Good Fiction Guide, it is a "vividly written experimental novel" and made a "strong impression" when it was published in 1981. Containing "postmodernist gimmicks" and self-refexive structures, it concerns a supposedly dead woman rewriting the story of her own death.

The novel led to Gee appearing on the Granta Best of Young British Novelists list for 1983. In a 2012 interview, Maggie Gee says: "I see it as partly luck – the novel came out in July when nothing much was published then, the first review was a rave in The Observer, then The Times ran an extract and everyone fell into line, because critics are easily influenced."

In a 1997 interview, Gee admits: "I was 25 when I wrote that book, and I suppose I had more of an exhibitionist streak at that age. I had such fun with the playfulness. As I got older I realised that being categorized as experimental, although it gets you lots of review space, is death; also that you can frighten a lot of readers off."

== Plot introduction ==
The novel concerns the death of Moira Penny, a postgraduate literature student in Oxford, whose naked body is found outside her apartment. But Moira Penny is also writing a novel about the death of an author. The narrative is circular in nature and "snakes through the minds of assorted people as they react to Moira's demise".

== Reception ==
Kirkus Reviews concluded that "Some of this material is - even if read as partial parody – stale and stagey. It certainly doesn't add up satisfyingly, with or without reference to the metafictional framework. But, page by page, Gee demonstrates promise as an ironic observer and darkly lyrical maker of vignettes – talents which would show up far better in a more straightforward, less cutely 'literary' novel'."
