= My Cleaner =

2005 novel by Maggie Gee

- First edition
- Author: Maggie Gee
- Language: English
- Publisher: Saqi Books
- Publication date: 2005
- Publication place: United Kingdom
- Media type: Print
- Pages: 318
- ISBN: 0-86356-544-1
- Followed by: My Driver

My Cleaner is a novel by English author Maggie Gee. It was first published in 2005 by Saqi Books and concerns racism and family life. According to Bernardine Evaristo it was her best novel to that date.

Maggie Gee visited Uganda in 2003, sponsored by the Cheltenham Literature Festival's 'Across Continents' commission and a Society of Authors grant, and the novel features many scenes set in that country. The story is continued in My Driver (2009).

== Plot introduction ==
The story is told from the viewpoint of Vanessa Henman, an English writer, and Mary Tendo, Ugandan graduate of Makerere University. Vanessa's 22-year-old son Justin refuses to get out of bed with depression. Justin asks for Mary who looked after him as a child so Vanessa writes to her. Mary returns to London to help Justin, but this time not as a cleaner...
