= My Driver =

2009 novel by Maggie Gee

- First edition
- Author: Maggie Gee
- Language: English
- Publisher: Telegram Books
- Publication date: Mar 2009
- Publication place: United Kingdom
- Media type: Print
- Pages: 300
- ISBN: 978-1846590795
- Preceded by: My Cleaner

My Driver is a novel by English author Maggie Gee, and is the sequel to My Cleaner. It was first published in 2009 by Telegram Books.

The novel is set in Uganda in the lead-up to the 2007 Commonwealth Heads of Government Meeting in Kampala.

The book has three main characters :

- London author Vanessa Henman is travelling to Uganda to attend a British Council sponsored conference for African authors to be held at the Sheraton Hotel in Kampala and afterwards as a tourist to see mountain gorillas in Bwindi.
- Mary Tendo, Vanessa's former cleaner is now Executive Housekeeper at the Sheraton; and is unaware that Vanessa will be attending the conference.
- Trevor Patchett, Vanessa's former husband is a plumber and has been invited out to Uganda by Mary Tendo to repair a well in her home village which is no longer supplying water, he is also unaware of Vanessa's visit.

Three other narratives make occasional appearances

- Back in London Vanessa and Trevor's son Justin is looking after his son Abdul Trevor who is unwell whilst Zakira his partner is travelling to Brussels on business
- On the border between Uganda and DR Congo a hungry teenage LRA child-conscript is trying to make his way back home to Uganda
- By way of contrast President Museveni considers his options in dealing with the international tensions.

== Reception ==
- "Executed with a lovely light touch ... an immensely enjoyable novel" - Lionel Shriver in The Daily Telegraph.
- "Worldly, witty, enjoyable, impressive" - Doris Lessing
- "it's sparky and funny and terrifically entertaining" - Patrick Ness in The Guardian.
- "Fast-moving, energetic, constantly surprising" - Hilary Mantel
- "This is a writer who clearly knows her way through central Africa's alphabet soup of rebel groups, and who also has a clear-eyed grasp of the scramble for money and power that drives the regions wars. Gee's novel is an admirable success" - Matthew Green, Financial Times.
