= Nicholas Rankin =

English writer and broadcaster (born 1950)

Nicholas Rankin (born 1950) is an English writer and broadcaster.

== Biography ==
Rankin was born in Yorkshire, England, but grew up in Kenya. His father was born in Glasgow. He was educated at Shrewsbury School and Christ Church, Oxford. He has lived and worked in Bolivia and Catalonia, Spain.

He worked for the BBC World Service for 20 years. He was Chief Producer, Arts, at the BBC World Service, when his eight-part series on ecology and evolution, A Green History of the Planet, won two UN awards.

He currently works as a freelance writer and broadcaster and lives in London with his wife, the novelist Maggie Gee. He has one daughter, Rosa.

He was elected a Fellow of the Royal Society of Literature in 2009.

== Bibliography ==
=== Books ===
- Dead Man's Chest: Travels after Robert Louis Stevenson. London, Faber and Faber, 1987. ISBN 978-0-571-13808-1
- Telegram from Guernica: The Extraordinary Life of George Steer, War Correspondent. London: Faber and Faber, 2003. ISBN 978-0-571-20563-9
- Churchill's Wizards: The British Genius for Deception 1914-1945. Faber and Faber. 2008. ISBN 978-0-571-22195-0.
- Ian Fleming's Commandos: The Story of 30 Assault Unit in WWII. London: Faber and Faber, 2011. ISBN 978-0-571-25062-2
- Defending the Rock: How Gibraltar Defeated Hitler. London: Faber and Faber. 2017. ISBN 978-0-571-30770-8.
- Trapped in History: Kenya, Mau Mau and Me. London: Faber and Faber. 2023. ISBN 978-0-571-30774-6.

=== Critical studies and reviews of Rankin's work ===
Churchill's Wizards

- Reviewed by Andrew Roberts, "Churchill's Wizards by Nicholas Rankin: review", in The Sunday Telegraph (5 November 2008)
- Reviewed by Michael Bywater, "Churchill's Wizards: the British Genius for Deception, 1914-1945 - Nicholas Rankin", in The Daily Telegraph (17 November 2008)
- Foot, M. R. D. (4 October 2008). "Stage effects in earnest". The Spectator. 308 (9397): 44. Archived from the original on 4 December 2008.

Ian Fleming's Commandos

- Reviewed by William Boyd, "Ian Fleming's Commandos by Nicholas Rankin – review", in The Guardian (22 October 2011)

Telegram from Guernica

- Reviewed by Robert Macfarlane, "Write the good fight", in The Observer (6 April 2003)
- Reviewed by D. J. Taylor, "Their man in Africa", in The Guardian (12 April 2003)

Dead Man's Chest: Travels after Robert Louis Stevenson

- a critical assessment is included in Lesley Graham's essay "Questions of Identity on the Stevenson Trail in Scotland", in Brown, Ian and Desmarest, Clarisse Godard (eds.), (2023), Writing Scottishness: Literature and the Shaping of Scottish National Identities, Association for Scottish Literature, Glasgow, pp. 138 - 156, ISBN 978-1-908980-39-7
