= Bruce Cooper =

Surgeon Lieutenant-Commander Bruce Cooper
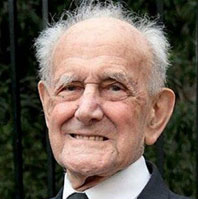
- Surgeon Lieutenant-Commander Bruce Cooper
- Born: William Albert Bruce Cooper; 22 November 1914; Castle Eden, County Durham, England
- Died: 3 December 2010 (aged 96)
- Military career
- Allegiance: United Kingdom
- Branch: Royal Navy
- Rank: Surgeon Lieutenant-Commander

Surgeon Lieutenant-Commander Bruce Cooper (22 November 1914 – 3 December 2010) was a native of Castle Eden, England. He obtained his medical degree from Durham University. Early in his career, he tended to coalminers and joined the Royal Naval Volunteer Reserve. The physician served with distinction in the early period of the Second World War and was mentioned in despatches. In 1941, he was recruited for a highly classified mission, Operation Tracer. In the event that Gibraltar was taken by the Axis powers, he was to be sealed into a secret chamber in the Rock of Gibraltar with five other men for about a year and report the movements of enemy vessels. Over a period of two years, the secret complex was completed and the team assembled and trained. However, the mission was never activated. Cooper returned to England and served in both civilian and military capacities. The location of the secret chamber remained a mystery for decades, but was finally discovered in 1997. However, many questions remained, including the identity of the team members. Upon Cooper's return to Gibraltar in 2008, he confirmed that the cave in question was that which had been destined for himself and his five colleagues. Dr Cooper was the last surviving team member of Operation Tracer in Gibraltar.

== Early life ==
William Albert Bruce Cooper was born on 22 November 1914 in Castle Eden, County Durham, England. The son of a physician, he received his education at Henry Smith Grammar School in Hartlepool, County Durham. In 1930, the teenager obtained work on a tramp steamer by prevaricating about his age. Cooper graduated with a medical degree from Durham University in 1938. Before the Second World War, he was a general practitioner in County Durham. There, he not infrequently had to treat the victims of coalmining accidents. In one such case, he had to maneuver half a mile in a tunnel, eventually rescuing a man pinned under a rockfall by amputating his lower extremity.

Cooper entered the Royal Naval Volunteer Reserve prior to the onset of the war. His first duty was on HMS Versatile, a destroyer based at Plymouth but transferred to Dover. On 13 May 1940, while accompanying HMS Hereward that was conveying Queen Wilhelmina of the Netherlands to England, Versatile was bombed by enemy aircraft and needed to be towed to Sheerness on the Isle of Sheppey by the destroyer HMS Janus. Cooper crawled through the lower levels of the vessel to attend the wounded, and was subsequently mentioned in despatches. Not long after Versatile was repaired at Sheerness, Cooper treated the survivors of HMS Cape Howe. The vessel had been disguised as RFA Prunella, and its survivors had been at sea for almost a week in a lifeboat after the Q-ship had been torpedoed on 21 June 1940 off the island Ushant in the English Channel.

== Operation Tracer ==
During shore leave in 1941, the physician was recruited for a covert operation by George Murray Levick (1876–1956), the explorer who had been part of the support crew for Captain Robert Scott (1868–1912) in Antarctica. Levick and five other men of the crew survived their eight-month trip to Cape Evans, which included an entire winter spent in a snow cave, eating seal blubber and penguin meat. Levick was called out of retirement to serve as the British Admiralty's consultant on survival in harsh conditions. Cooper was told nothing about the highly classified mission until he volunteered for it. Requested to suggest another physician, a friend, he recommended Arthur Milner, a civilian doctor in Morecambe. Four additional men were recruited for the top secret mission. Operation Tracer entailed the sealing of six men in a cave in the Rock of Gibraltar for about a year, so that they could report the movements of enemy ships should Gibraltar fall to the Axis powers.

After initial training was completed, a rehearsal was undertaken at Romney Marsh, England. Upon the arrival of the team in Gibraltar, the men were assigned employment to serve as cover for their presence. Cooper's cover was dual: physician at the Gibraltar dockyard and censor of soldier's letters. However, the officer in Gibraltar who assigned men to vessels was not privy to Operation Tracer and Cooper was nearly sent to sea. Training for the Tracer team occurred on a regular basis. Cooper resided at the Rock Hotel; he would go through its front entrance in the uniform of a surgeon-lieutenant of the Royal Naval Volunteer Reserve, and exit through the back in the attire of a sergeant of the British Army. From there, he went into a tunnel for training. Later, he relocated to an apartment, with the Chief of Police as his roommate. During their off-duty time, the team was allowed to go into Spain, and Cooper recalls meeting athlete and actor Buster Crabbe during his stay in Gibraltar. However, Operation Tracer was never activated and, in August 1943, once the tide of the war had turned, orders went out for the cave to be sealed.

== Later life ==
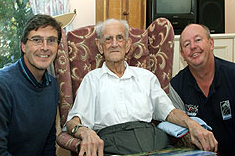
Jim Crone, Bruce Cooper, and Pete Jackson (left to right) in November 2006

Cooper returned to England following the end of Operation Tracer and, in 1945, married Hazel Ratcliffe. His brother, Thomas Bruce Cooper, DFC, died in March 1945. The physician was employed at Morecambe hospital until 1947, at which time he purchased a practice in Fulwood, Preston, Lancashire. He eventually developed the practice into a four-man partnership. Not only did he make house calls; Cooper performed small household tasks for his older patients. The physician was a founding member of the Royal Society of General Practitioners. In 1962–1963, he served a term as chairman of the British Medical Association. In 1977, he "retired" to serve on the training ship Uganda. When Uganda was repurposed in Gibraltar in 1982 as a hospital ship for the Falklands War, Cooper opted to go to war again, at the age of 67. He was a Mason for more than sixty years and served as a judge for twelve years. In addition, he was active in several charitable organisations. Cooper was a carpentry and driving enthusiast, and was in his 80s when he purchased his last Jaguar.

The location of Operation Tracer was discovered in December 1997 by the Gibraltar Caving Group. Dr Cooper met Sergeant Major Pete Jackson of the Royal Gibraltar Regiment and Jim Crone in November 2006, and had the opportunity to relate his memories of Operation Tracer. In October 2008, he returned to Gibraltar and confirmed that the Stay Behind Cave discovered in 1997 was the same covert chamber that had been constructed for his use and that of his five colleagues. Other events that had been organised for Dr Cooper and his family that week included a trip on a Gibraltar Squadron patrol boat, a tour of the Second World War tunnels, and his guest appearance at the annual Trafalgar Day ceremony at the Trafalgar Cemetery.

Retired Surgeon Lieutenant-Commander Bruce Cooper was widowed in 2001, and died on 3 December 2010 at age 96, leaving behind a son and two daughters. He was the last surviving member of Operation Tracer.
