= Gibraltar Caving Group =

- Type: Non-governmental organisation
- Purpose: heritage and environment
- Location: Gibraltar
- Parent organization: Gibraltar Ornithological and Natural History Society
- Website: Website

The Gibraltar Caving Group is an organisation based in the British Overseas Territory of Gibraltar. It forms the Caves and Cliffs Section of the Gibraltar Ornithological and Natural History Society. The group of skilled cavers and climbers has multiple roles, engaging in cave exploration and research, avian rescue, and rare plant discovery. It performs surveys and clears areas with limited access. However, it is perhaps most well known for the discovery that four of its members made in December 1996. While exploring tunnels in the southern portion of the Rock of Gibraltar, they found the entrance to Operation Tracer, also known colloquially as Stay Behind Cave. Rumours of a covert World War II observation post had circulated in Gibraltar for decades. The Gibraltar Caving Group continued its exploration and evaluation of the facility under the auspices of the Gibraltar Museum.

== History ==
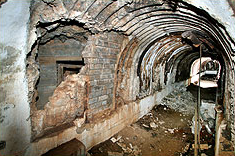
Operation Tracer, Stay Behind Cave, entrance (left) with brickwork partially removed.

The Gibraltar Caving Group is based in Gibraltar, the British Overseas Territory at the southern end of the Iberian Peninsula. It forms the Caves and Cliffs Section (also known as the Caving and Climbing Section) of the Gibraltar Ornithological and Natural History Society (GONHS), which was established in 1976. That section of the society is composed of members with substantial caving and climbing experience. Until recently, the organisation represented the only caving club in Gibraltar. However, the Gibraltar Museum Caving Unit has since been founded; the unit collaborates with the Gibraltar Caving Group. The Gibraltar Caving Group's role in Gibraltar includes cave exploration, avian rescue, rare plant discovery, and cave research. They are also instrumental in clearing regions that would otherwise be difficult to access. The group should be distinguished from the Gibraltar Cave Science Unit. While the second organisation is also a division of the GONHS and is composed of skilled cavers and climbers, the primary mission of the Cave Science Unit is the oversight of monitoring and sampling projects in the caves. The two divisions have some members in common.

The Gibraltar Caving Group discovered the location of the long-sought-after Operation Tracer in December 1996. It had become known locally as Stay Behind Cave, as the official name was a mystery at the time. The group that made the discovery comprised Richard Durrell, Jean Paul Latin, Mark Ainsworth, and Ian Bramble. They had heard rumours of a secret military complex in Gibraltar since they were children. The group had analysed the possible locations and realised that in order for the World War II observation post to monitor both the Mediterranean Sea and the Bay of Gibraltar, the chamber would have to be positioned very high up in the Upper Rock. One day while exploring tunnels, the men experienced an unexpected gust of wind. It induced them to closely examine the tunnel walls. Carefully breaking down a portion of the corrugated galvanised iron wall, they discovered the doorway to a passage, which led to a chamber. Examining the interior of the room and its associated passages, they found that the west side observation post over the bay was a slit that was concealed with a concrete wedge. The east side observation post had a larger opening through which someone could climb onto a narrow ledge and still be concealed. The group also found the remains of a bicycle that had been used to generate electricity and power a ventilation system. In addition, there was a water tank with a capacity of 10,000 imperial gallons (45,000 L). While sludge initially came out of the tank's tap, the water soon ran clear. The group exploring the chambers quickly realised that they had discovered Stay Behind Cave. Although a survival manual for Operation Tracer was compiled, the Gibraltar Caving Group has not yet been able to access it. Under the auspices of the Gibraltar Museum, the group performed a survey of the complex in conjunction with the Spanish organisation GIEX, a Speleological Research Group from Jerez de la Frontera. After detailed measurements, member Mark Ainsworth used a computer to generate drawings of the complex. In addition, 3-dimensional images were created utilising a survey technique by GIEX member J. Aguilera.

In October 2002, the Gibraltar Caving Group conducted an urgent environmental survey of Little Bay Cliff after the allocation of the bid for the planned cliff stabilisation project, but before the work commenced. The survey was done on behalf of the Government of Gibraltar and included visual inspection and photography of the site. In 2004, members of the caving group collaborated with the Royal Holloway University of London's Department of Earth Sciences on a project to determine the reaction of speleothems to weather and seasons. New St. Michael's Cave in Gibraltar was utilised as an on-site laboratory.
