= Neanderthals in Gibraltar =

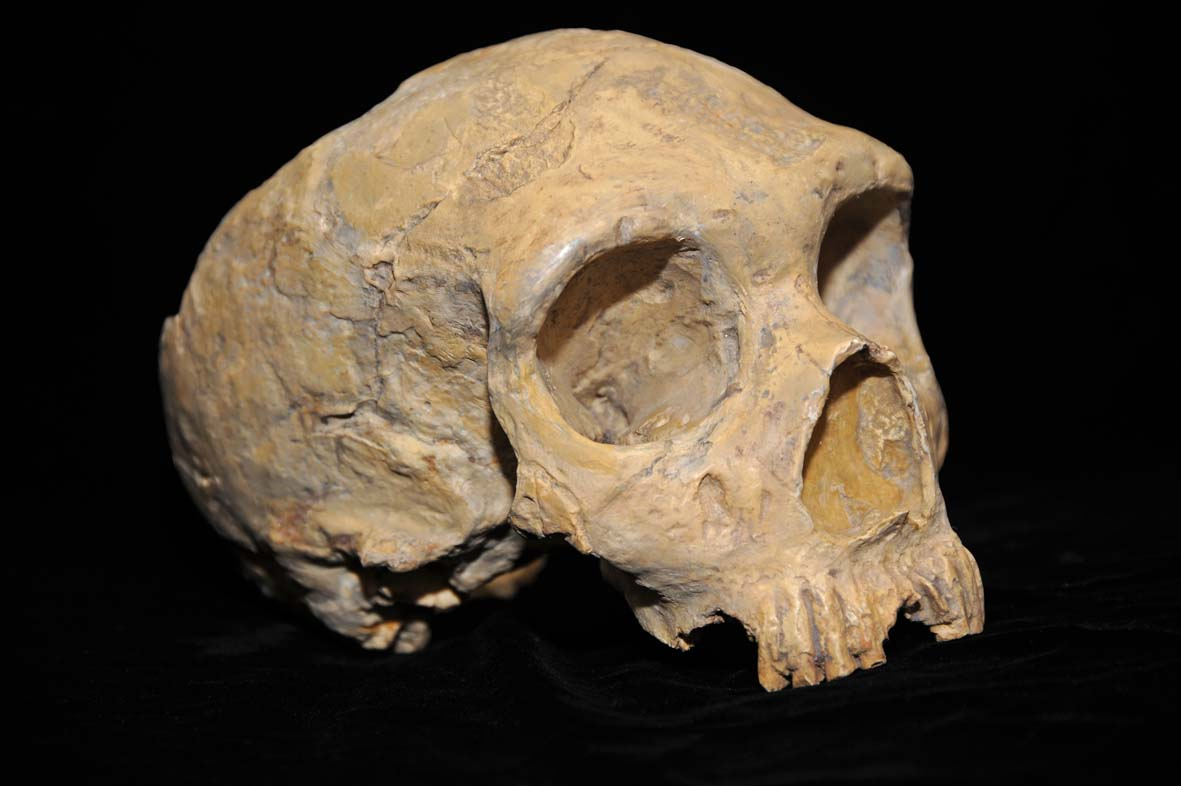
The Gibraltar 1 skull, discovered in 1848 in Forbes' Quarry, was only the second Neanderthal skull and the first adult Neanderthal skull ever found.

The Neanderthals in Gibraltar were among the first to be discovered by modern scientists and have been among the most well studied of their species according to a number of extinction studies which emphasize regional differences, usually claiming the Iberian Peninsula partially acted as a “refuge” for the shrinking Neanderthal populations and the Gibraltar population of Neanderthals as having been one of many dwindling populations of archaic human populations, existing just until around 42,000 years ago. Many other Neanderthal populations went extinct around the same time.

The skull of a Neanderthal woman, discovered in a quarry in 1848, was only the second Neanderthal skull ever found and the first adult Neanderthal skull to be discovered, eight years before the discovery of the skull for which the species was named in Neandertal, Germany; had it been recognised as a separate species, it might have been called Calpican (or Gibraltarian) rather than Neanderthal Man. The skull of a Neanderthal child was discovered nearby in 1926. The Neanderthals are known to have occupied ten sites on the Gibraltar peninsula at the southern tip of Iberia, which may have had one of the densest areas of Neanderthal settlement of anywhere in Europe, although not necessarily the last place of possible habitation.

The caves in the Rock of Gibraltar that the Neanderthals inhabited have been excavated and have revealed a wealth of information about their lifestyle and the prehistoric landscape of the area. The peninsula stood on the edge of a fertile coastal plain, now submerged, that supported a wide variety of animals and plants which the Neanderthals exploited to provide a highly varied diet. Unlike northern Europe, which underwent massive swings in its climate and was largely uninhabitable for long periods, the far south of Iberia enjoyed a stable and mild climate for over 125,000 years. It became a refuge from the ice ages for animals, plants and Neanderthals. Around 42,000 years ago, the climate underwent cycles of abrupt change which would have greatly disrupted the Gibraltar Neanderthals' food supply and may have stressed their population beyond recovery, leading to their aggregated extinction in areas of Europe with similar climates.

== Fossil discoveries ==
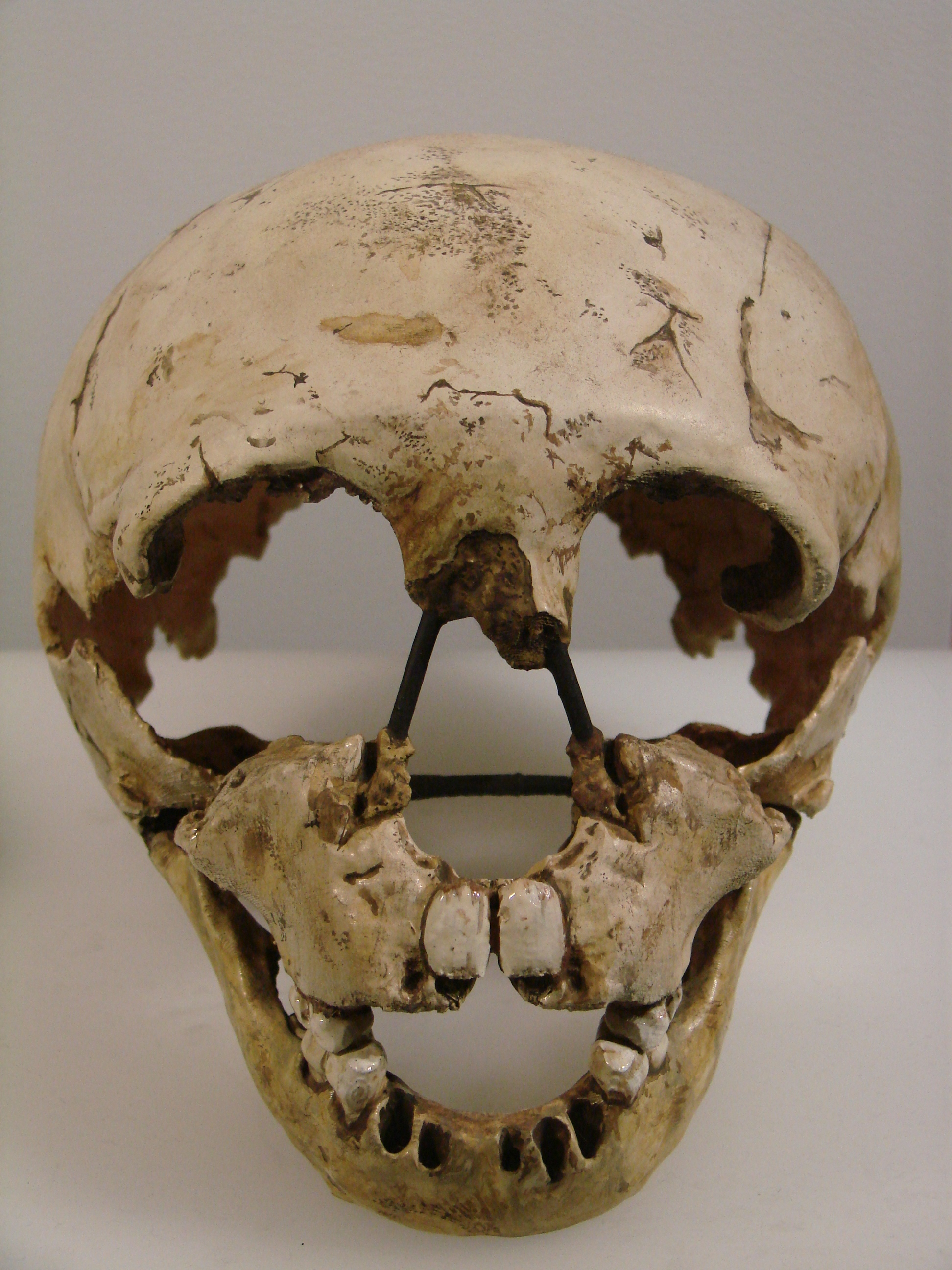
The Gibraltar 2 skull, discovered in 1926 in Devil's Tower Cave, was the second Neanderthal skull to be found in Gibraltar

The Gibraltar Neanderthals first came to light in 1848 during excavations in the course of the construction of a fortification called Forbes' Barrier at the northern end of the Rock of Gibraltar. The skull of a Neanderthal was discovered in Forbes' Quarry by Lieutenant Edmund Flint, though its exact provenance is unknown, and was the subject of a presentation to the Gibraltar Scientific Society by Lieutenant Flint in March 1848. It was not realised at the time that the skull, now known as Gibraltar 1, was of a separate species and it was not until 1862 that it was studied by palaeontologists George Busk and Hugh Falconer during a visit to Gibraltar. They gave a report on it to the British Association for the Advancement of Science in 1864 and proposed that the species be called Homo calpicus after Mons Calpe, the ancient name for Gibraltar. It was only later realised that the skull was a specimen of Homo neanderthalensis, which had been named for the Neanderthal 1 skull found in Germany in 1856. Busk described it as "characteristic of a race extending from the Rhine to the Pillars of Hercules", highlighting its importance as confirmation that the Neanderthal 1 specimen was genuinely a member of a distinct species and not simply a deformed Homo sapiens.

The skull was the first Neanderthal adult cranium to be discovered and, although small, is nearly complete; it is thought to have belonged to a woman due to its gracile features. In 1926, a second Neanderthal skull was found by Dorothy Garrod at a rock shelter named Devil's Tower, very close to Forbes' Quarry. This fossil, known as Gibraltar 2, is much less complete than the Gibraltar 1 skull and has been identified as that of a four-year-old child. Further excavations at the two sites are infeasible. Quarrying at Forbes' Quarry has meant that it has been virtually denuded of Pleistocene sediments while Devil's Tower is directly under the North Front of the Rock of Gibraltar and is one of the most dangerous places on the entire peninsula due to frequent rockfalls.

== Occupation sites ==
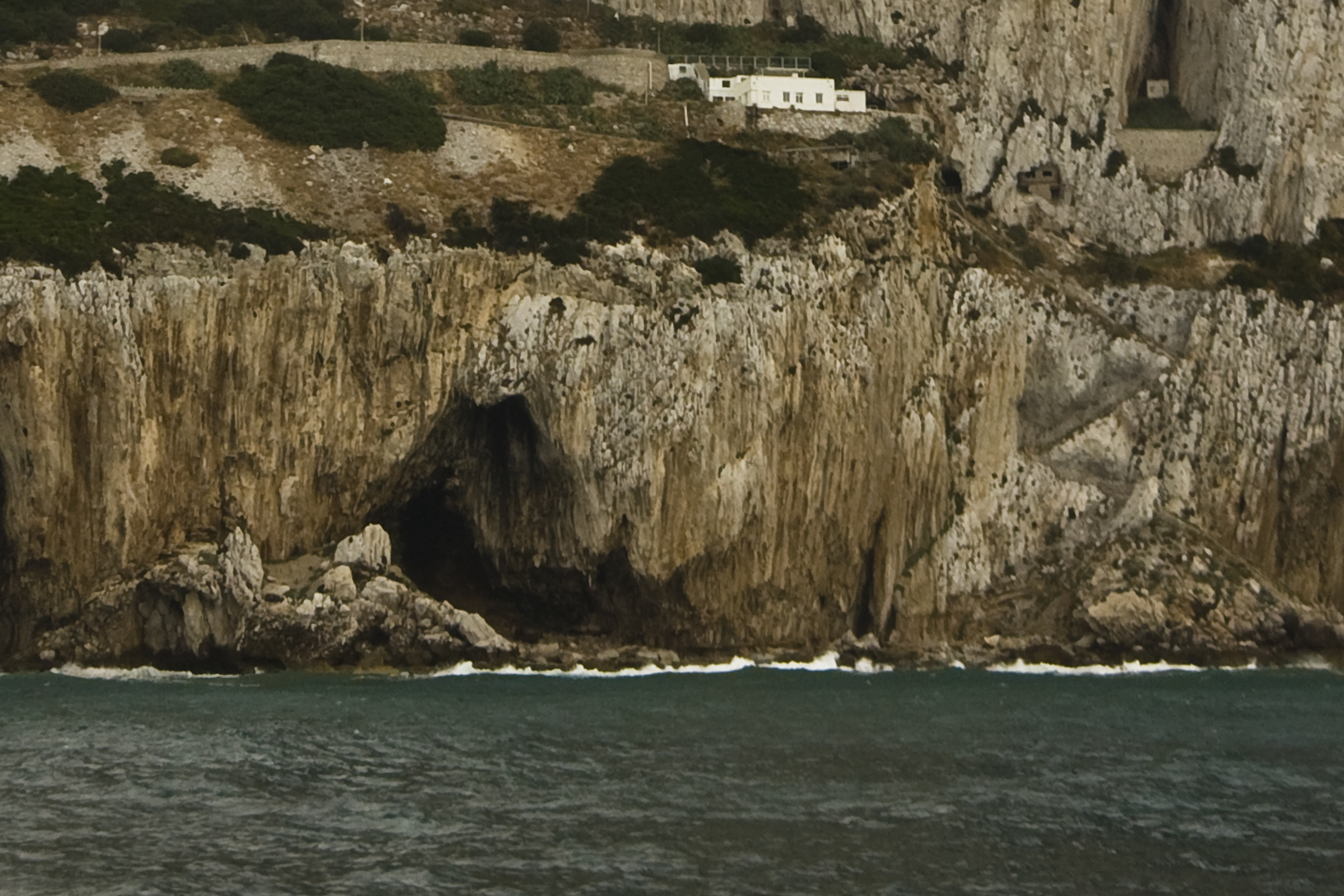
The entrance to Gorham's Cave on the south-eastern flank of the Rock of Gibraltar

The limestone massif of the Rock of Gibraltar is riddled with caves – its ancient name, Calpe, means "hollow" – and it was here that archaeologists focused their efforts to find sites of Neanderthal occupation. Ten such sites have been discovered so far, of which the most important are five caves on the eastern side of the Rock: Ibex Cave, high up on the east side, which was only discovered in 1975 due to being buried under the wind-blown sands of the Great Gibraltar Sand Dune, and four sea caves near sea level on the south-eastern flank: Boathoist Cave, Vanguard Cave, Gorham's Cave and Bennett's Cave.

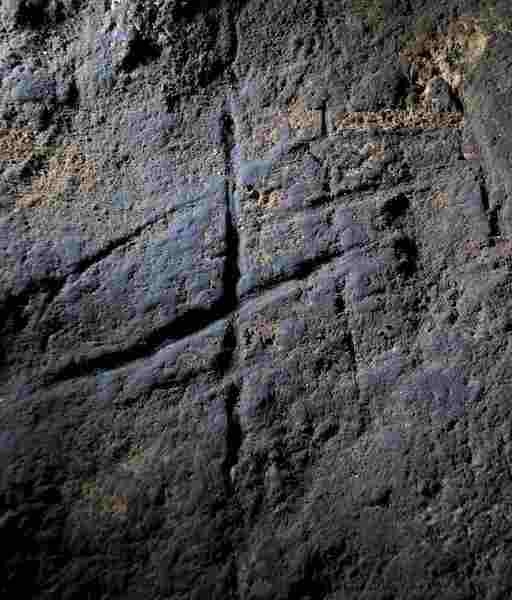
The prehistoric engraving found in Gorham's Cave in July 2012

Large-scale excavations in 1947–54 by John d'Arcy Waechter showed that Gorham's Cave had been occupied for over 100,000 years during the Middle Palaeolithic, Upper Palaeolithic and Holocene epochs. Further excavations have been carried out in Gorham's, Vanguard and Ibex Caves since 1994 as part of the Gibraltar Museum's Gibraltar Caves Project. The excavations have revealed possibly the best evidence of a Neanderthal landscape found anywhere, buried under many metres of sand, fallen stalactites, bat guano and other debris that has fortuitously preserved an abundance of palaeontological evidence on the cave floors. The finds have enabled palaeontologists to reconstruct the lifestyles of the occupants and their environment in considerable detail.

The finds in Gorham's Cave include charcoal, bones, stone tools and burnt seeds dating from the Middle to Upper Palaeolithic periods, while Vanguard Cave contains Pleistocene and Middle Palaeolithic deposits. When Ibex Cave was discovered in 1975, fifty artifacts from the Middle Pleistocene period were found on the surface along with vertebrate remains and shells. Neanderthal tools were found in an excavation carried out there in 1994 by the Gibraltar Caves Project, though occupation of the cave seems to have been sporadic. Most of the stone tools appear to have been deposited during a single period of occupation, perhaps as short as a single day.

In July 2012, archaeologists discovered an engraving in Gorham's Cave, buried under 39,000-year-old sediments, which has been called "the oldest known example of abstract art". Consisting of a series of intersecting lines, the engraving is located about 100 metres (330 ft) inside the cave on a ledge that is thought to have been used by Neanderthals as a sleeping place. Its meaning (or whether it had any meaning) is not known but researchers have described it as providing the first evidence that Neanderthals had the cognitive ability to produce abstract art. The engraving was clearly made deliberately, rather than being an accidental by-product of another process such as cutting meat or fur, and would have taken a significant amount of effort to carve into the dolomite rock of the cave.

== Gibraltar in prehistory ==
Hominin timeline
← / Earlier apes; ← / Gorilla split; ← / Chimpanzee split; ← / Earliest bipedal; ← / Earliest sign of Ardipithecus; ← / Earliest sign of Australopithecus; ← / Earliest stone tools; ← / Earliest sign of Homo; ← / Dispersal beyond Africa; ← / Earliest fire / cooking; ← / Earliest rock art; ← / Earliest clothes; ← / Modern humans
(million years ago)

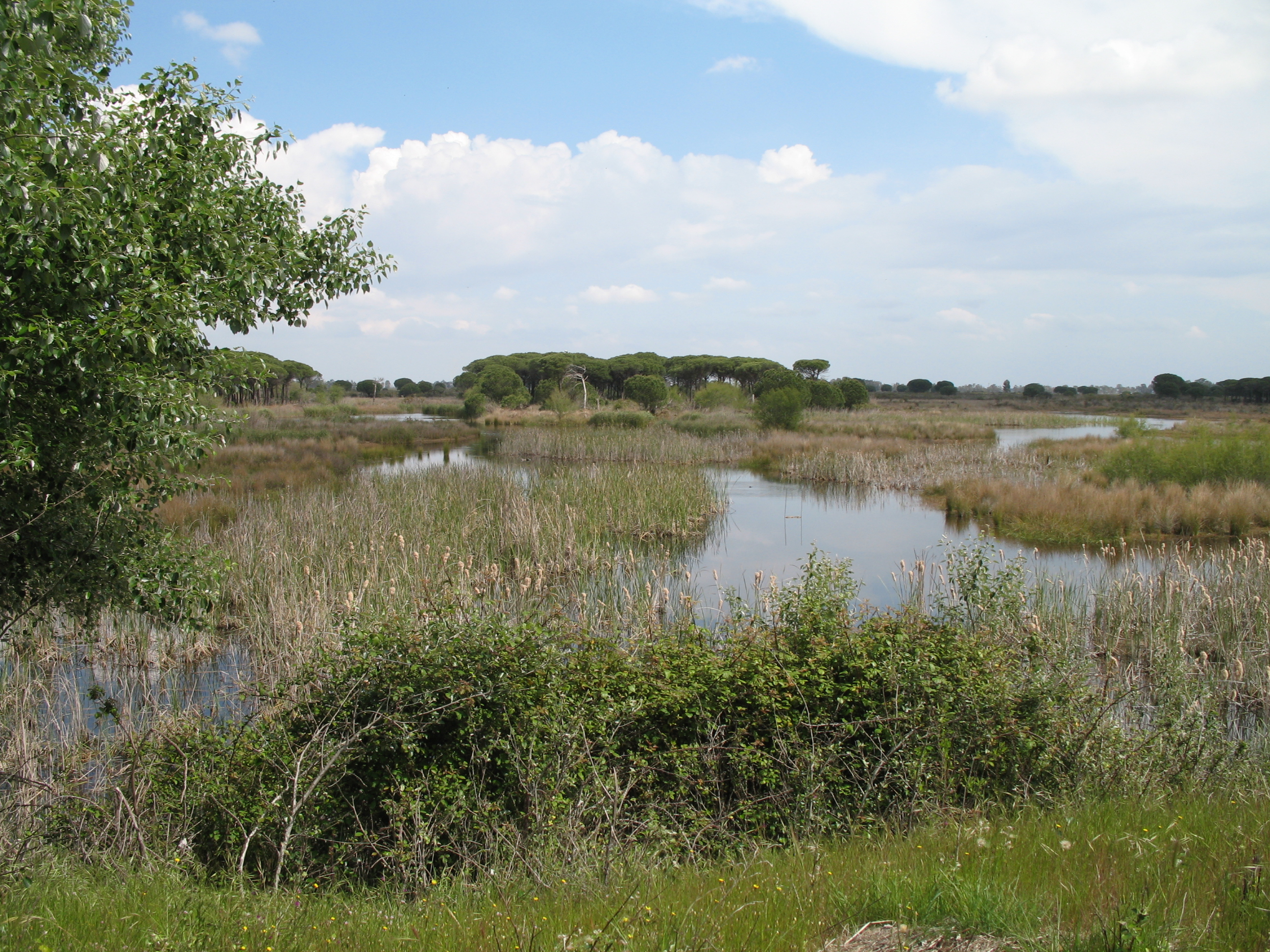
The landscape of the present-day Doñana National Park would have been similar to that of the coastal plain surrounding Pleistocene Gibraltar

Pleistocene Gibraltar was physically very different from today. During the ice ages, the much greater volume of water locked up in the polar ice caps and continental glaciers meant that sea levels were far lower than in the present day. In the late Pleistocene period, when Neanderthals inhabited Gibraltar, the sea level was as much as 85 metres (279 ft) lower than today. The drop in sea levels exposed a coastal plain which considerably increased the size of the Gibraltar peninsula. The Bay of Gibraltar, to the west, was considerably smaller than it is today and was probably an estuary, while the eastern coast of the peninsula would have extended out around 2.5 kilometres (1.6 mi) to 4.5 kilometres (2.8 mi) east of the modern shoreline. Another small estuary to the north-east of Gibraltar would have marked the northern boundary of the peninsula's extended shoreline. Whereas modern Gibraltar is only 6.8 square kilometres (2.6 sq mi) in size, the Pleistocene coastal plain would have added about another 35 square kilometres (14 sq mi).

The entire coastal plain is now submerged in the Bay of Gibraltar, Strait of Gibraltar and Alboran Sea due to the rise in sea levels over the last 12,000 years, but its environment can be reconstructed in detail from the evidence of pollen, seeds and animal bones found in the caves of Gibraltar. It would have predominantly been a sandy grassland with patchy trees and shrubs, supporting a wide variety of flora and fauna. The wildlife included important game species – red deer, wild cattle, rabbits and wild boars – and predators including spotted hyenas, leopards, lynxes, wolves, brown bears, wildcats and possibly lions. Gibraltar was, then as now, a key waypoint on the avian migration route between Europe and Africa and a very wide variety of birds were present. Bones from the caves indicate the widespread presence of scavengers such as various species of vulture and waterbirds that would have lived in the estuarine areas of the plain. The general appearance of the habitat was similar to that of the present-day Doñana National Park, 132 kilometres (82 mi) north-west of Gibraltar.

The region enjoyed a much more stable and temperate climate than almost anywhere else in Iberia. The range of the climate of prehistoric Gibraltar can be deduced from proxies such as the remains of animals that are very sensitive to heat and humidity, such as Hermann's tortoise, which depends on a mean annual temperature of 14 °C (57 °F) for its eggs to hatch and a rainfall of no more than 600 millimetres (24 in) annually. Whereas northern Europe underwent massive climatic swings between temperate and extreme glacial conditions, which made large areas of the continent uninhabitable for extended periods, Gibraltar's prehistoric climate appears to have been largely unaffected by such changes. The iconic ice age mammals of northern Europe – woolly rhinos, mammoths, bison, reindeer, muskox and cave bears – never made it as far south as Gibraltar, which enjoyed a temperate and stable year-round climate due to its southerly latitude, distance from the coastal mountains and position on the Mediterranean shore. As a result, it became a kind of "Africa in Europe" where animals, plants and Neanderthals were able to shelter from the worst effects of the ice ages.

== Lifestyle of the Gibraltar Neanderthals ==
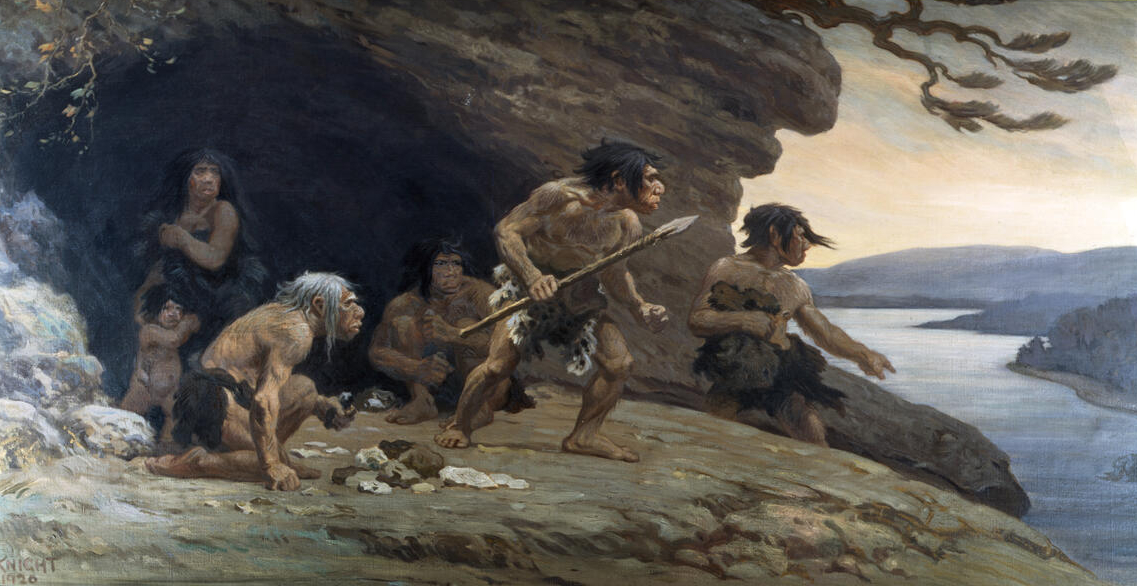
Neanderthal family group in Le Moustier, France, by Charles R. Knight (1920)

The evidence from Gibraltar's caves shows that the Neanderthals occupied the peninsula for at least 100,000 years. They probably did not stay there year-round but lived in widely dispersed groups that roamed across the open savannah and coastal wetlands of southern Iberia, seeking seasonal supplies of food. They are likely to have followed the movements of the animals, for instance following them to waterholes during dry summer periods. Gibraltar's southerly latitude would have meant a fairly constant pattern of activity throughout the year due to the long days and mild climate, in contrast to the more abruptly seasonal lifestyle of the Neanderthals who lived further north.

Animal remains found in the caves show that the Neanderthals were active hunters. Their predominant large prey appears to have been ibex, which would have been plentiful in the vicinity of the Rock. Red deer and other grazing animals are also well represented. More dangerous animals like wild boar, aurochs and rhino appear to have been avoided – understandably so, given that the Neanderthals are thought to have relied on using thrusting spears in close-quarter ambushes.

In addition to large animals, they also ate very large quantities of small mammals and birds. 80% of the bones found in the caves are those of rabbits, which would have been abundant in the coastal sand dunes. The Neanderthals exploited Gibraltar's location as one of Europe's focal points for migratory birds, by catching and eating them in large quantities. 145 species, representing a quarter of Europe's total, are represented in the finds from the caves, making them the richest sites for fossil bird remains anywhere in Europe. They also ate tortoises and even monk seals, suggesting that they might have hunted or at least scavenged marine mammals. They certainly ate shellfish in large quantities; many mussel shells have been found in the caves, indicating that the Neanderthals harvested them from the seashore and brought them back over a considerable distance, perhaps carrying them in bags made from animal skins.

The range of resources consumed by the Neanderthals seems to have remained constant throughout the 100,000 years of their occupation, as did their tools; as they did not face changes to their local environment, they had no need to develop new technologies, unlike the northern Neanderthals. This technological stasis is clearly visible from the artefacts found in Gibraltar. The newest Neanderthal tools to have been found there are virtually identical to the oldest, all exclusively being examples of the Mousterian type of flint tools that were first developed around 300,000 years ago. The Neanderthals even used the same hearth in Gorham's Cave for over 8,000 years. Animal bones from the vicinity show that the Neanderthals used the caves for cooking and butchery, as is apparent from the presence of bones which are burnt or have cut marks from Neanderthal stone knives.

Gibraltar's Neanderthals may have been the last members of their species. They are thought to have died out around 42,000 years ago, at least 2,000 years after the extinction of the last Neanderthal populations elsewhere in Europe. They did not disappear during the Last Glacial Maximum during the time of the H2 Heinrich event, when ocean circulations were disrupted by very rapid climate fluctuations which coincided with the disintegration of coastal ice sheets. Between 45,000 and 42,000 years ago, the climate abruptly became extremely cold, arid and unstable, with overall conditions around 42,000 years ago leading to the Neanderthals' disappearance. The fertile savannah was replaced by pine forests while higher ground became an arid steppe. The food resources available to the Gibraltar Neanderthals would have changed substantially, with many species disappearing and only partially being replaced by cold-weather species migrating from the north. They could not migrate away to warmer climates; although Africa is only 24 kilometres (15 mi) away across the Strait of Gibraltar, the Gibraltar Neanderthals were trapped as they had no boats. The ultimate cause of the extinction of the Gibraltar Neanderthals is not known but was probably not due to competition with modern humans, who did not arrive in the area until about 18,000 years ago. Their population had probably been shrinking for millennia and the abrupt climate change may have stressed them beyond recovery, leaving them vulnerable to the effects of inbreeding and outbreaks of disease.

== See also ==
- Dawn of Humanity (2015 PBS documentary)
- Engis 2
- List of fossil sites (with link directory)
- List of human evolution fossils (with images)
- Neanderthal
- Neanderthal 1
- Neanderthals in Southwest Asia
- Origins of Us (2011 BBC documentary)
- Prehistoric Autopsy (2012 BBC documentary)

== Bibliography ==
- Brown, Kimberly; Finlayson, Clive (2011). "Appendix 2: Gibraltar". In Marquez-Grant, Nicholas; Fibiger, Linda (eds.). The Routledge Handbook of Archaeological Human Remains and Legislation: An International Guide to Laws and Practice in the Excavation and Treatment of Archaeological Human Remains. London: Taylor & Francis. ISBN 978-1-136-87956-2.
- Finlayson, Clive; Giles Pacheco, Francisco (2000). "The Southern Iberian Peninsula in the Late Pleistocene: Geography, Ecology and Human Occupation". In Stringer, Chris; Barton, R.N.E.; Finlayson, Clive (eds.). Neanderthals on the Edge: Papers from a Conference Marking the 150th Anniversary of the Forbes' Quarry Discovery, Gibraltar. Oxford: Oxbow Books. ISBN 978-1-84217-015-1.
- Finlayson, Clive; Fa, Darren A.; Jiménez Espejo, Francisco; Carrión, Jóse S.; Finlayson, Geraldine; Giles Pacheco, Francisco; Rodríguez Vidal, Joaquín; Stringer, Chris; Martínez Ruiz, Francisca (April 2008). "Gorham's Cave, Gibraltar—The persistence of a Neanderthal population". Quaternary International. 181 (1). Elsevier: 64–71. Bibcode:2008QuInt.181...64F. doi:10.1016/j.quaint.2007.11.016.
- Finlayson, Clive; Giles Pacheco, Francisco; Rodríguez Vidal, Francisco; Fa, Darren A.; Gutierrez López, José María; Santiago Pérez, Antonio; Finlayson, Geraldine; Allue, Ethel; et al. (19 October 2006). "Late survival of Neanderthals at the southernmost extreme of Europe". Nature. 443 (7113). Nature Publishing Group: 850–853. Bibcode:2006Natur.443..850F. doi:10.1038/nature05195. hdl:10261/18685. PMID 16971951. S2CID 4411186.
- Finlayson, Clive (2009). The Humans Who became extinct: Why Neanderthals Died Out and We Survived. Oxford: Oxford University Press. ISBN 978-0-19-923919-1.
- Hills, George (1974). Rock of Contention: A history of Gibraltar. London: Robert Hale & Company. ISBN 0-7091-4352-4.
- Stringer, Chris (2000). "Gibraltar and the Neanderthals 1848-1998". In Stringer, Chris; Barton, R.N.E.; Finlayson, Clive (eds.). Neanderthals on the Edge: Papers from a Conference Marking the 150th Anniversary of the Forbes' Quarry Discovery, Gibraltar. Oxford: Oxbow Books. ISBN 978-1-84217-015-1.
- Wood, Bernard, ed. (2011). "Forbes' Quarry". Wiley-Blackwell Encyclopedia of Human Evolution. Oxford: John Wiley & Sons. ISBN 978-1-4443-4247-5.
- Human Timeline (Interactive) – Smithsonian, National Museum of Natural History (August 2016).
