= Gibraltar 1 =

Hominin fossil

Gibraltar Skull
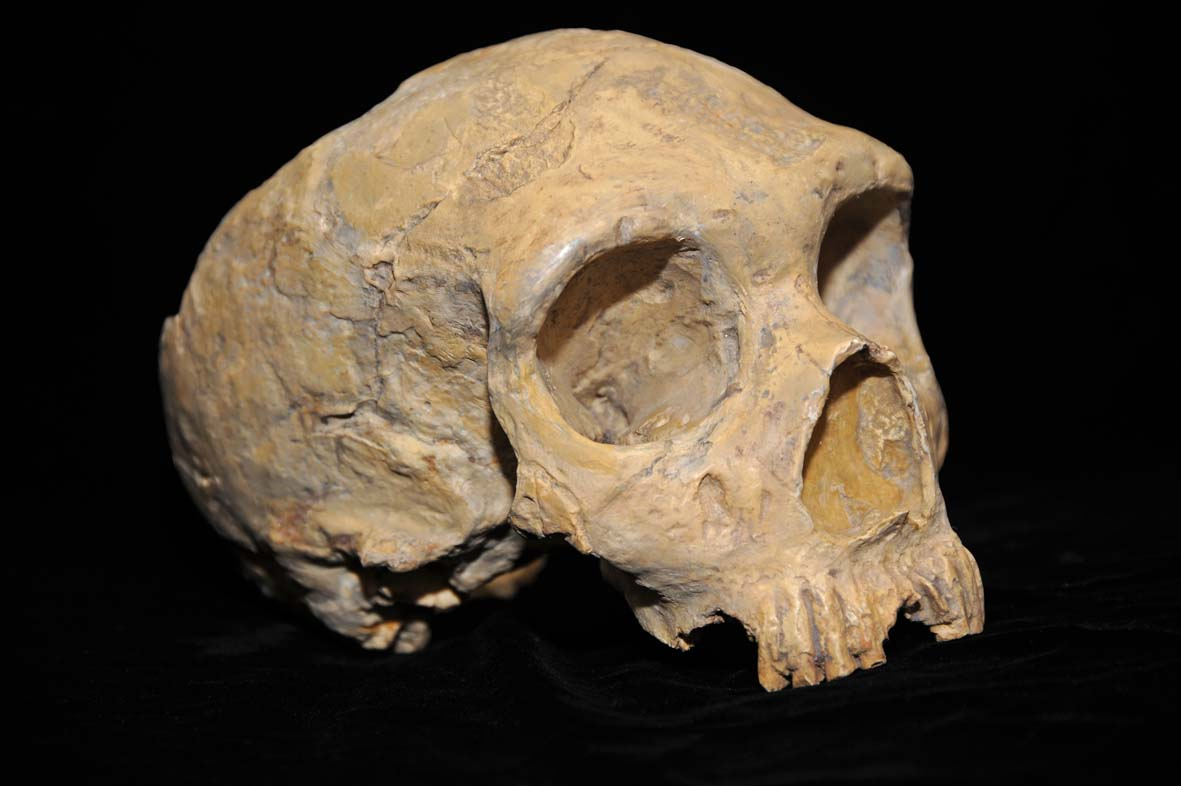
- Common name: Gibraltar Skull
- Species: Homo neanderthalensis
- Age: Unknown
- Place discovered: Forbes' Quarry, Gibraltar
- Date discovered: c. 1848
- Discovered by: Unknown

Gibraltar 1 is the name given to a Neanderthal skull, also known as the Gibraltar Skull, which was discovered at Forbes' Quarry in Gibraltar. The skull was presented to the Gibraltar Scientific Society by its secretary, Lieutenant Edmund Henry Réné Flint, on 3 March 1848. This discovery predates the finding of the Neanderthal type specimen.

== In 19th century science ==
Found more than ten years before the publication of Charles Darwin's Origin of Species and eight years prior to the famous discovery in the Neander Valley, the significance of the find was not understood at the time, and the skull was simply labelled as "an ancient human, died before the universal flood" and remained forgotten inside a cupboard at the Garrison Library for many years. After the publication of Origin of Species, a renewed interest in the fossil human remains led to the skull being brought out of obscurity, and presented at a meeting in the British Association for the Advancement of Science in 1864. Darwin was not present, but the skull was later examined by both Darwin and Thomas Huxley, who concluded the skull was that of an extinct human species. Darwin did however only make fleeting reference to Gibraltar 1 in the 1871 Descent of Man. A cast of the skull can be viewed at the Gibraltar Museum – the original is on display in the Human Evolution gallery of the Natural History Museum in London.

== Age ==
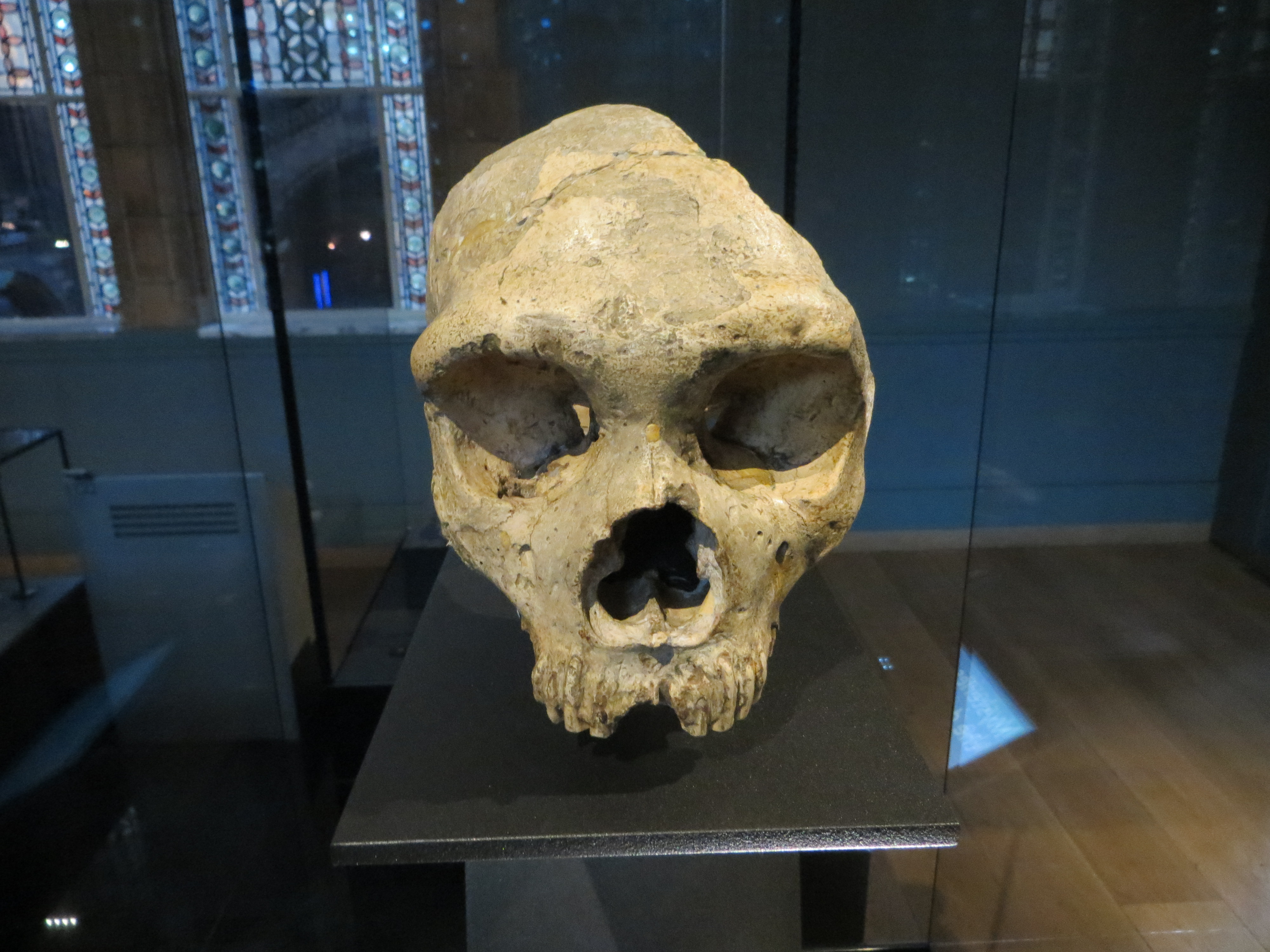
Front view of the skull in the Natural History Museum, London

The original find was done in a time when the palaeontological dating was still in its infancy, and no stratigraphic information was supplied with the skull, making dating at best guesswork. Another specimen from a different locale on Gibraltar (Gibraltar 2) has however been dated to between 30 thousand to 50 thousand years old. The skull is that of an adult woman, also with typical Neanderthal features. While the skull was one of the first to be found, it was also possibly from one of the last surviving Neanderthal populations.

== Gibraltar as a refuge ==
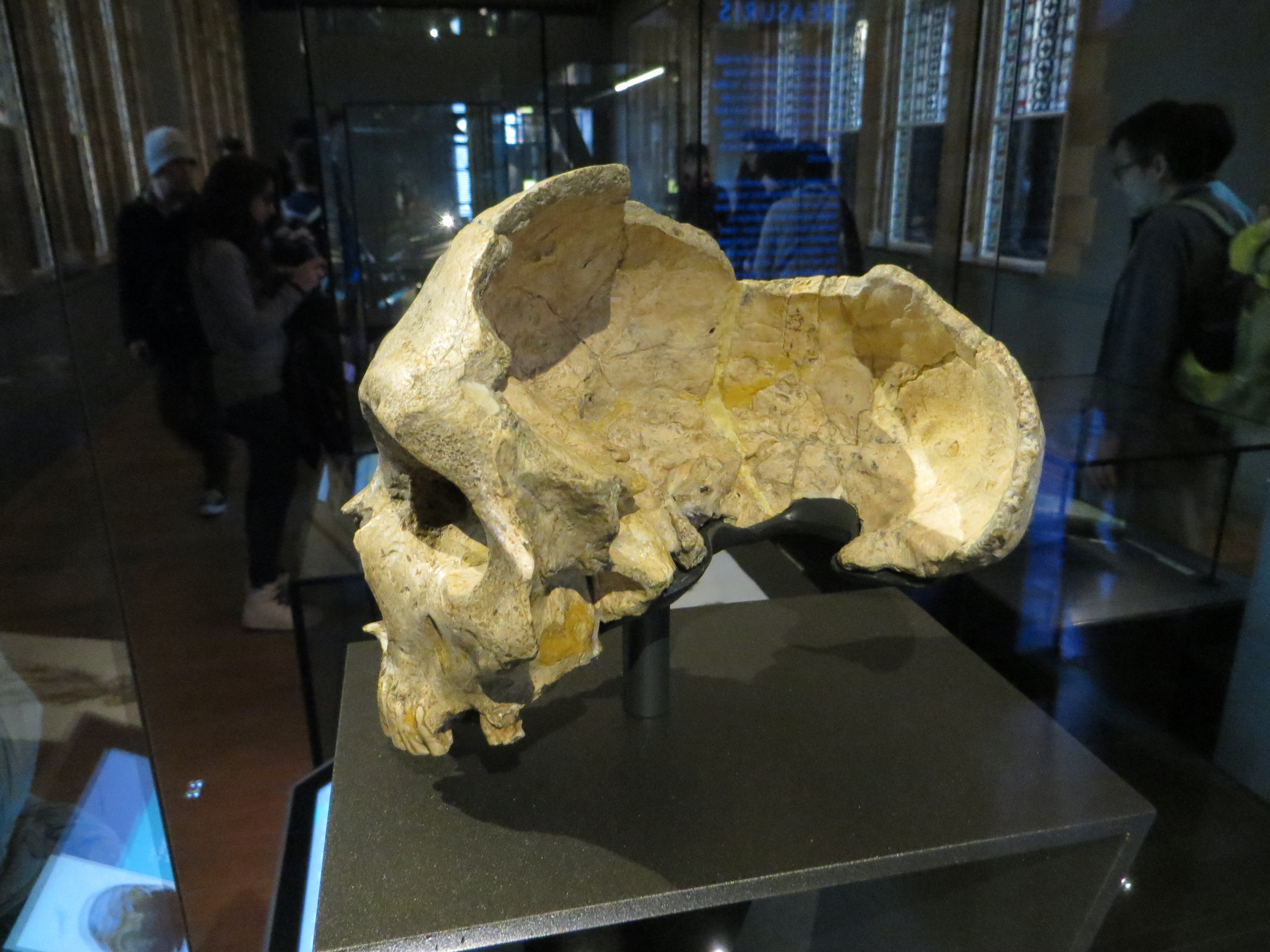
Side view of the Skull

Until the late twentieth century, it was believed that the last Neanderthals disappeared about 35,000 years ago. However, studies have suggested that Neanderthals survived in southern Iberia and Gibraltar to less than 30,000 years before the present. Radiocarbon dating performed on charcoal in Gorham's Cave in Gibraltar in 2006 suggests that Neanderthals lived there 24,000 to 28,000 years ago, well after the arrival of Homo sapiens in Europe 40,000 years ago. Vanguard Cave and Gorham's Cave are still the sites of active archaeological excavation in 2012. These caves may have represented the refugium of Gibraltar's Neanderthals.

== 3D model ==
Three dimensional model of Gibraltar 1
Video of a 3D model of Gibraltar 1 Neanderthal skull discovered at Forbes' Quarry.

== See also ==
- Engis 2
- Gibraltar 2
- Neanderthal
- Neanderthal 1
- List of fossil sites (with link directory)
- List of human evolution fossils (with images)
- History of Gibraltar
