= Gibraltar 2 =

Hominin fossil

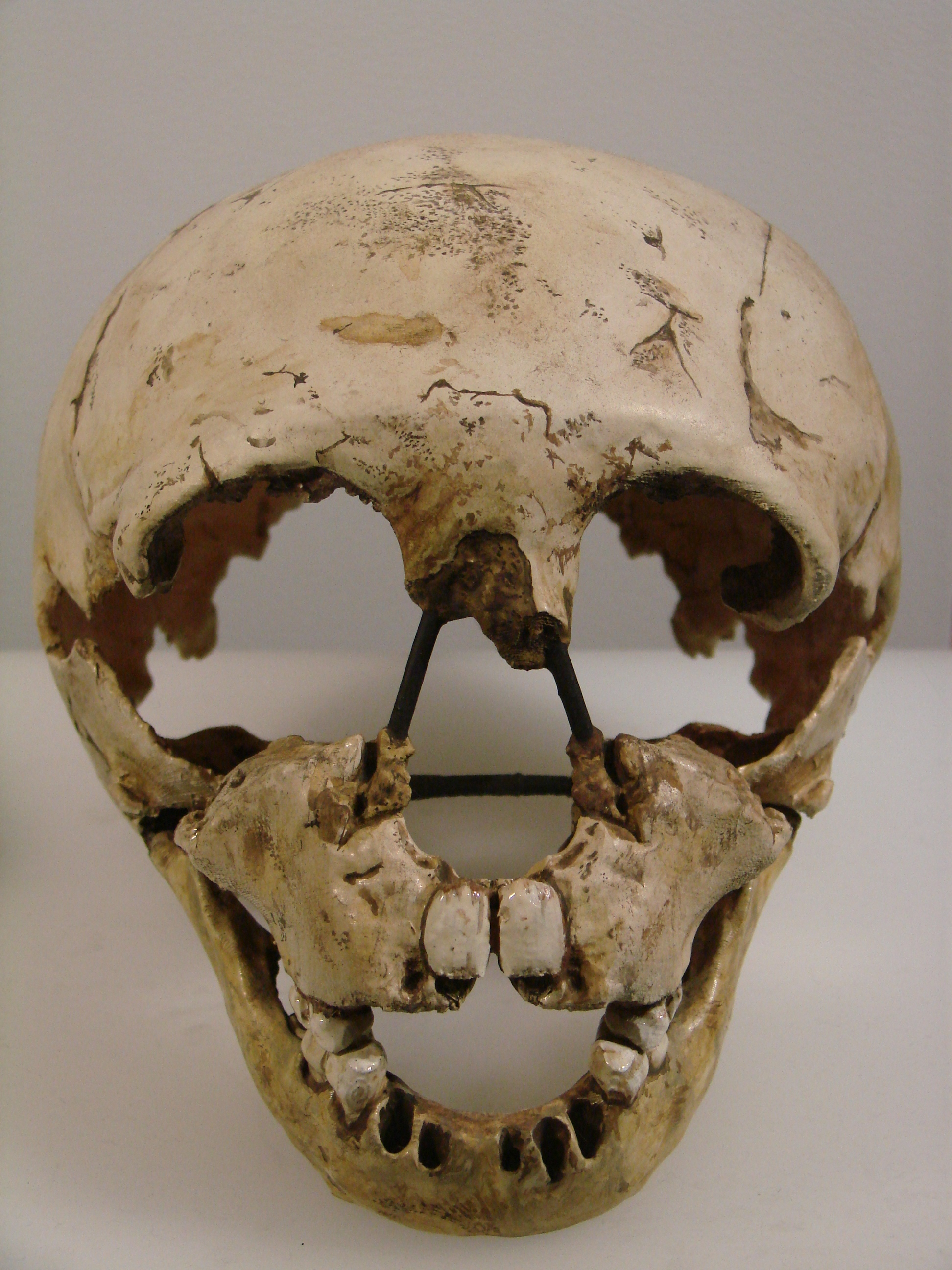
- Common name: Gibraltar 2
- Species: Neanderthal
- Age: c. 40,000 years ago (aged c. 4)
- Place discovered: Devil's Tower Mousterian Rock Shelter, Gibraltar
- Date discovered: 1926
- Discovered by: Dorothy Garrod

Gibraltar 2, also known as Devil's Tower Child, represented five skull fragments of a male Neanderthal child discovered in the British Overseas Territory of Gibraltar. The discovery of the fossils at the Devil's Tower Mousterian rock shelter was made by archaeologist Dorothy Garrod in 1926. It was the second excavation of a Neanderthal skull in Gibraltar, after Gibraltar 1. In the early twenty-first century, Gibraltar 2 underwent reconstruction.

== History of Gibraltar 1 ==
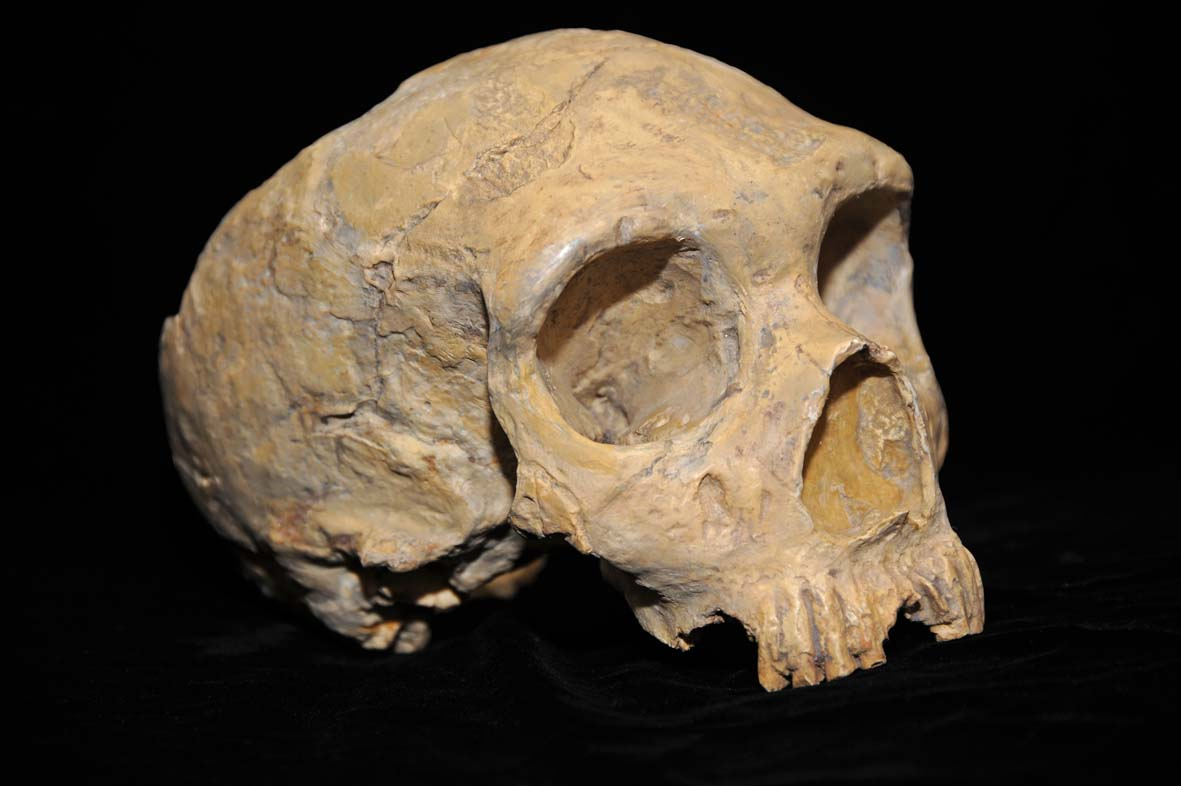
Gibraltar 1 was discovered by Edmund Flint in 1848

Prehistoric man resided in Gibraltar, the British Overseas Territory at the southern end of the Iberian Peninsula. The evidence was first found in the Devil's Tower Road area, at Forbes' Quarry, in the north face of the Rock of Gibraltar. This was the site of the 1848 discovery of the first Neanderthal skull by Lieutenant Edmund Flint (d. 12 January 1857) of the Royal Artillery. The fossil, an adult female skull, is referred to as Gibraltar 1 or the Gibraltar Skull (pictured at left). Neanderthals were unknown at the time that the fossil was found. Lieutenant Flint, secretary of the Gibraltar Scientific Society, presented his discovery to the organisation on 3 March 1848. Eight years later, in 1856, fossils were discovered in a cave of the Neander Valley near Düsseldorf, Germany. Those remains were described in 1864 as Homo neanderthalensis by Professor William King of Queen's College, Galway, now University College. Later that year, the Gibraltar Skull was sent to England and exhibited by George Busk at the meeting of the British Association for the Advancement of Science, with its similarity to the Neander Valley fossils noted. However, it wasn't until the early twentieth century that Gibraltar 1 was identified as the skull of a Neanderthal. If the skull's significance had been understood in the nineteenth century, Neanderthal Man would probably have been termed "Gibraltar Man".

== Discovery of Gibraltar 2 ==
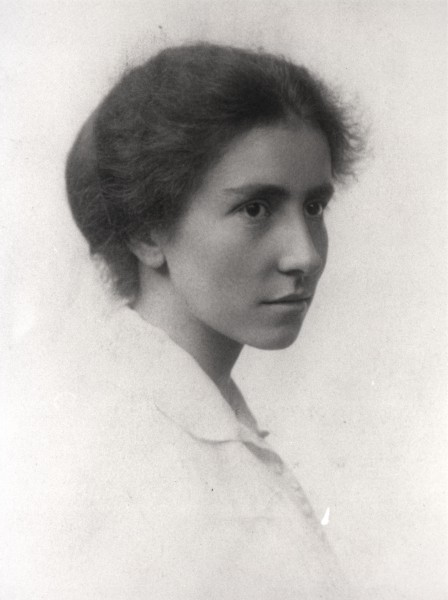
Archaeologist Dorothy Garrod discovered Gibraltar 2 in 1926

Additional evidence of Neanderthal occupation in Gibraltar was found at the Devil's Tower Mousterian rock shelter, also at the north face of the Rock of Gibraltar. Devil's Tower was a 17th century watchtower which was located at the eastern end of Devil's Tower Road. The archaeological site was initially discovered by Henri Breuil, who had recommended investigation. Breuil, a French paleontologist and archaeologist, is renowned for his expertise on prehistoric cave art.

The excavations at the Devil's Tower cave started in November 1925 and continued until December 1926 in three phases. In 1926, the skull of a Neanderthal child was discovered by archaeologist Dorothy Garrod. Garrod, who had studied with Breuil in Paris, went on to perform archaeological excavations in France, Palestine, Kurdistan, and Bulgaria. She was the first female professor at both the University of Cambridge and the University of Oxford. In addition, in 1939, Garrod was elected to the Disney Chair. Garrod found five skull fragments which were described by the archaeologist and others in The Journal of the Royal Anthropological Institute of Great Britain and Ireland in 1928. The five fragments were maxillary, parietal, temporal, cranial, and mandibular. Mousterian flake stone tools were found near the child's remains. The skull of the male Neanderthal child is known as Gibraltar 2 or Devil's Tower Child (pictured above).

In a study described in 1993 in the Journal of Human Evolution, the striation pattern of the dental enamel of the Devil's Tower Child fossil was compared to that of modern hunter-gatherers and medieval individuals from Spain. It was found that the Devil's Tower Child had a more abrasive diet than medieval individuals. Gibraltar 2 had a high number of striations. Further, the ratio of horizontal to vertical striations suggested that Gibraltar 2 may have been primarily carnivorous. The child is estimated to have been about four years old at the time of death.

By 2008, the face of the Devil's Tower Child had been reconstructed (pictured below) at the University of Zurich by means of computer-assisted paleoanthropology (CAP). This involved using computed tomography (CT) to perform volume data acquisition of the five skull fragments unearthed by Garrod in 1926. The five cranial fragments were then transformed with the software FoRM-IT into virtual 3D images. With the five virtual images then suspended in anatomical space according to scientific criteria, the missing fragments were replaced with mirror images of the excavated fragments. By means of laser stereolithography, the virtual reconstruction of the face and skull of the Devil's Tower Child was converted to a physical model. The soft tissues were then approximated using 3D Thin Plate Splining (TPS) with data from a modern child. Plasticine modelling clay was accordingly applied on the physical model to simulate soft tissue. The final model of Gibraltar 2 was then cast; finishing touches included paint and human hair (link to final image below).

== Gibraltar as a refugium ==
At the end of the 20th century, it was believed that the Neanderthals went extinct c. 35,000 years ago. In 2006, radiocarbon dating of charcoal from Gorham's Cave, Gibraltar, suggested that Neanderthals survived in southern Spain and Gibraltar at least 28,000 years ago, well after the arrival of Humans in Europe c. 40,000 years ago. More recently, new decontaminated radiocarbon dating (from the same Oxford laboratory that published the late date in 2006) suggests Neanderthals had vacated Gibraltar around 42,000 years ago, earlier than elsewhere in Europe.

== Gallery ==
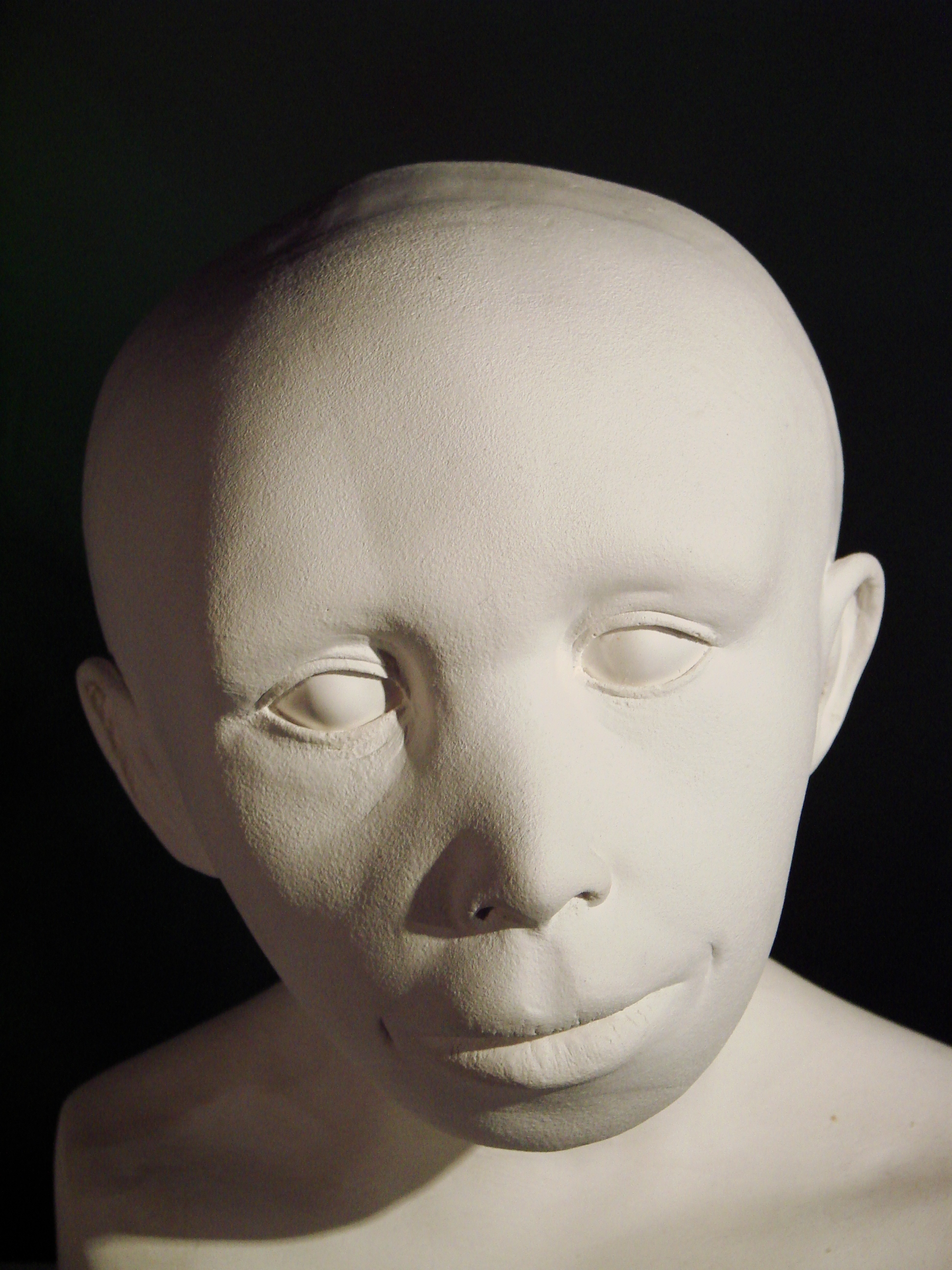
Devil's Tower Child reconstruction

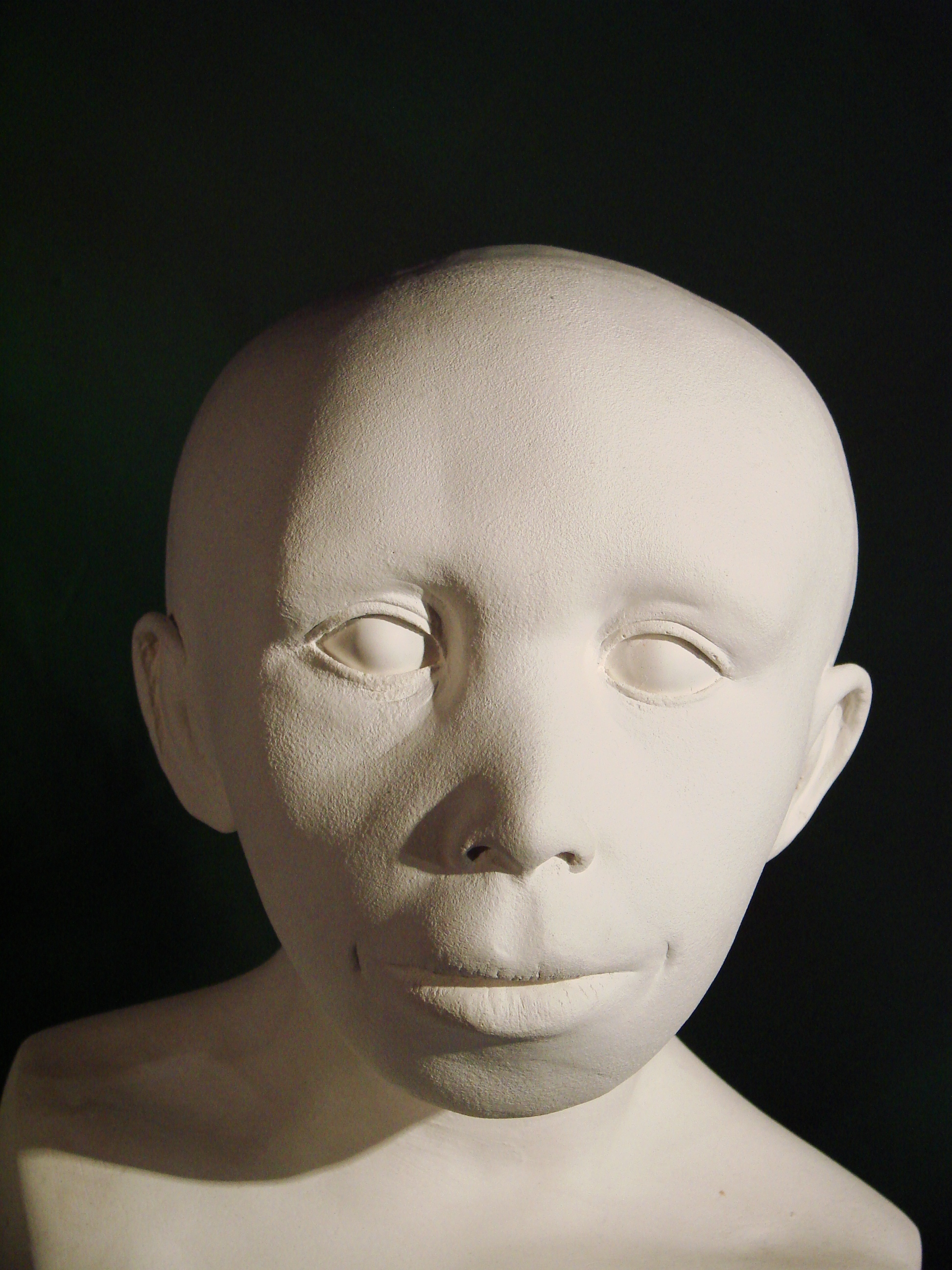
Devil's Tower Child reconstruction

== See also ==
- Gibraltar 1
- Neanderthal
- Neanderthal 1
- History of Gibraltar
