= Engis 2 =

Neanderthal fossil discovered in the early 19th-century in modern day Belgium

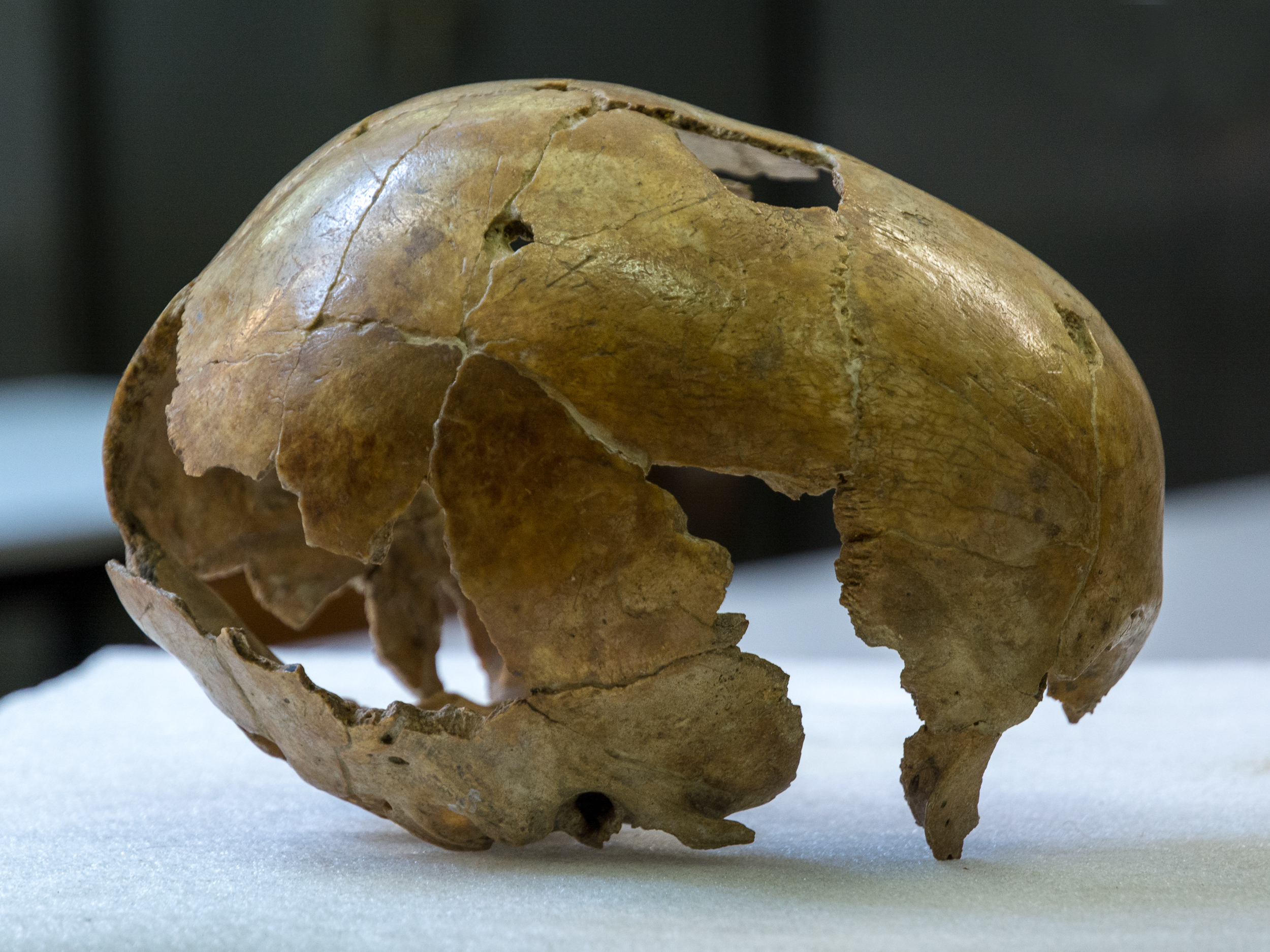
- Lateral view of juvenile
- Common name: Engis 2
- Species: Neanderthal
- Age: 35,350 years (aged c. 3)
- Place discovered: Flemalle, Liege, Belgium
- Date discovered: 1829
- Discovered by: Philippe-Charles Schmerling

Engis 2 refers to part of an assemblage, discovered in 1829 by Dutch/Belgian physician and naturalist Philippe-Charles Schmerling in the lower of the Schmerling Caves. The pieces that make up Engis 2 are a partially preserved calvaria (cranium) and associated fragments of an upper and a lower jaw, a maxillary bone and an upper incisor tooth of a two to three year old Neanderthal child. The Schmerling Caves are situated just north of the Belgian municipality Engis, whence the name of this group. In 1833 Schmerling described and publicized the find, which included animal bones and stone tools. Recognizing their old age, he associated them with the "Ethiopian Type" of the diluvial period. Although it was not recognized as such until 1936, the publication represents the first scientific description of a Neanderthal fossil.

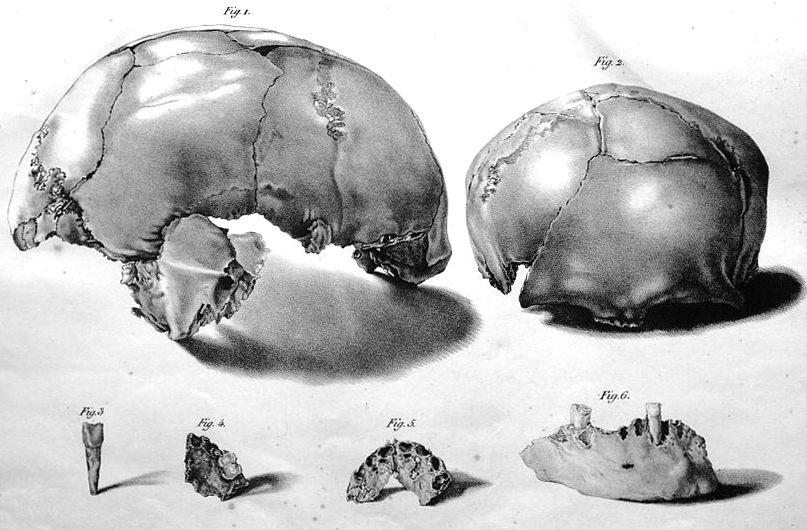
Engis 1. Adult Homo sapiens. 1 – skull in profile, 2 – frontal view, 3 – upper incisor, 4 – upper jaw fragment, 5 – maxillary bone, 6 – fragment of lower jaw

== Early Misclassification ==
Originally misclassified as "modern", the fossil received little attention after its publication in the 19th century as it was compared to Engis 1 – the almost perfectly preserved skull of an adult Homo sapiens. In 1758, Carl Linnaeus had published the 10th edition of his work Systema Naturae in which Homo sapiens as a species name was introduced to the public, yet without a thorough diagnosis and without a precise description of the species-specific characteristics. As a result, any criteria by which a fossil of the species Homo sapiens could be classified into and distinguished from the genus Homo did not exist in the early 19th century.

Even Thomas Henry Huxley, a supporter of Darwin's theory of evolution, saw in the 1863 findings of the Engis cave a "man of low degree of civilization" and also interpreted the Neandertal 1 fossils of the Kleine Feldhofer Grotte unearthed in 1856 as belonging within the range of variations of modern man. Additionally, the skull of an infant Neanderthal and an equally old child of anatomically modern humans are of far greater resemblance than their respective adult skulls. The vast majority of the anthropologists of the 19th and early 20th century considered all hominid fossils as belonging to representatives of early "races" of modern man. Hence it was incorrectly believed that the modern man's skull Engis 1 must be related to the child's skull Engis 2.

== Reclassification and Age ==
Two radiocarbon dates are available for Engis 2. However, the earlier result of 26,820 ± 340 radiocarbon years before present (BP) was considered to be too young by the authors and likely to be a result of contamination, so has been discarded. The more accurate date is 30,460 ± 210 radiocarbon years BP, which corresponds to 34,590–36,110 years BP after calibration. The assignment of Engis 2 to Homo neanderthalensis and Engis 1 to Homo sapiens was primarily based on anatomical and chronological comparisons as Engis 2 was recovered in the context of Neanderthal Mousterian artefacts.

== Condition of the bones and associated assemblages ==
In 1986, cut marks were found on the top of the skull of Engis 2, which were later identified as to be preparation damage " formed during restoration of the vault, moulding striae formed when mold part lines were incised into the fossil and profiling striae formed when craniograms were made with sharp steel instrument tips." The findings are preserved at the Collections de Paléontologie Animale et Humaine of the University of Liège. The bone fragments called Engis 3 have gone missing. The evolutionary origin of an ulna (forearm bone) fragment called Engis 4 discovered in 1872 is unclear; it has not been associated with a specific taxon.

== See also ==
- List of fossil sites (with link directory)
- List of human evolution fossils (with images)
- Neanderthal
- Neanderthal 1
- Neanderthals of Gibraltar
