= Philippe-Charles Schmerling =

Belgian-Dutch scientist

- Philip Carel Schmerling
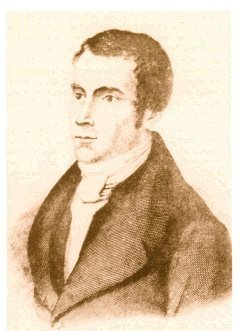
- Philippe-Charles Schmerling
- Born: 2 March 1791; Delft
- Died: 7 November 1836 (aged 45); Liège
- Citizenship: Dutch/Belgian
- Known for: Paleontology
- Spouse: Elizabeth Douglas
- Scientific career
- Fields: History, Paleontology, Geology
- Thesis: 'De studii psychologiae in medicina utilitate et necessitate' (1825)

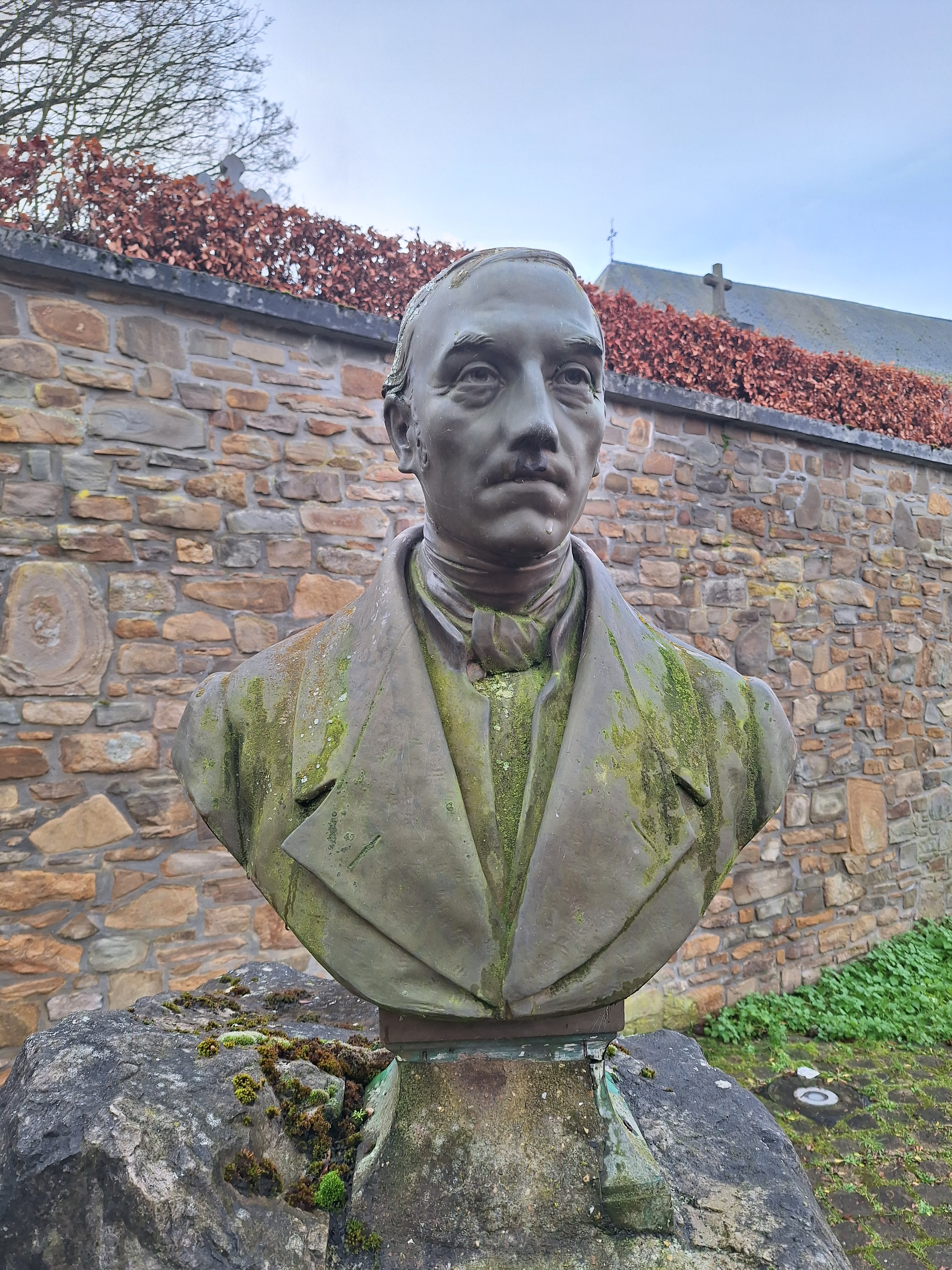
Philippe-Charles Schmerling monument by Léon Mignon (1847-1898)

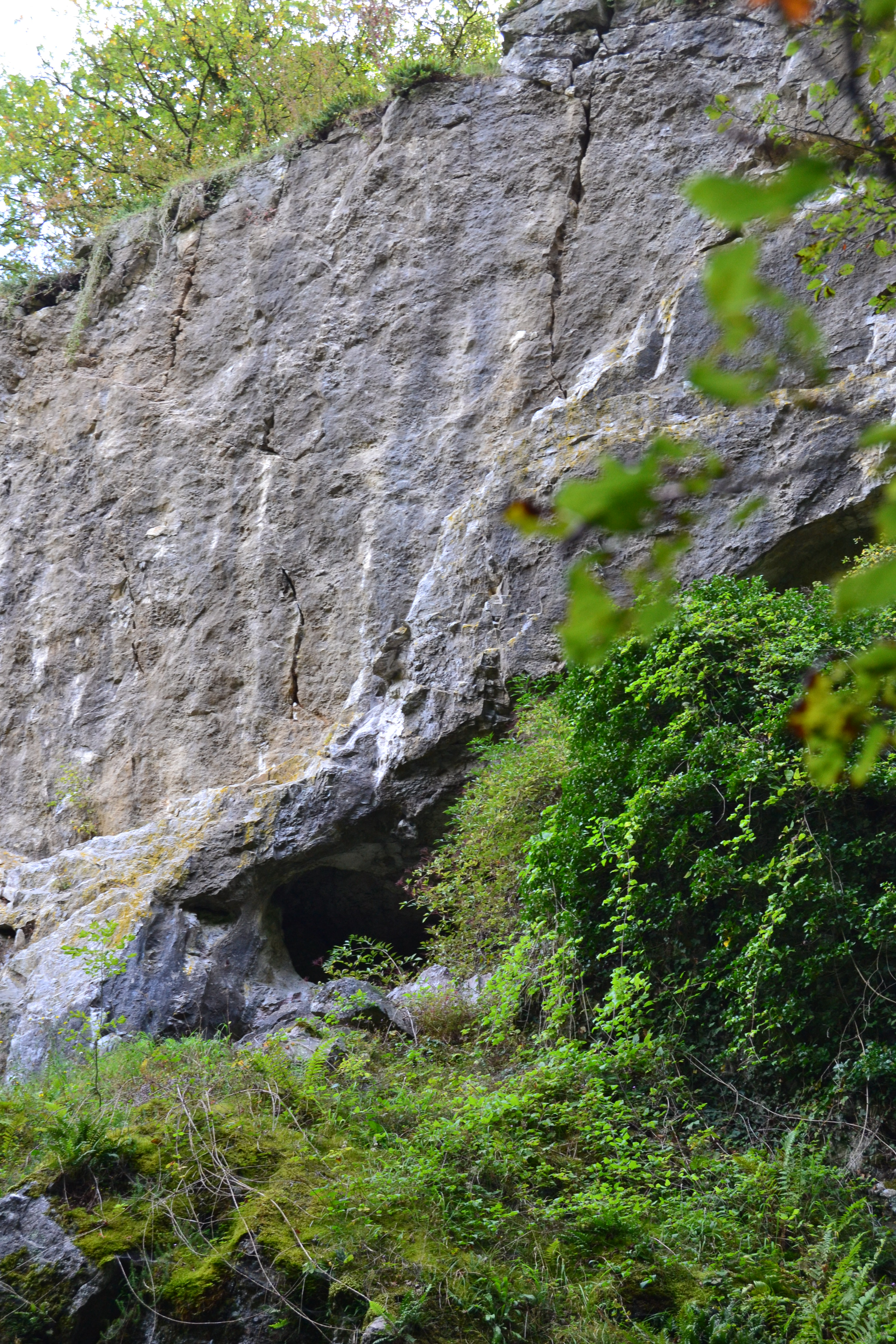
The upper Schmerling Cave (fr)

Philippe-Charles or Philip Carel Schmerling (2 March 1791 Delft – 7 November 1836, Liège) was a Belgian prehistorian, pioneer in paleontology, and geologist. He is often considered the founder of modern paleontology.

In 1829 he discovered the first Neanderthal fossil in a cave in Engis, the partial cranium of a small child, although it was not recognized as such until 1936, and is now thought to be between 30,000 and 70,000 years old. It was the second discovery of a fossil of the genus Homo after the discovery of the Red Lady of Paviland in Wales in 1823.

== Life ==
Philipus Carel, later Philippe-Charles, Schmerling was the son of Dutch parents, Jan Carel, a trader from 's-Hertogenbosch, North Brabant, and Lucia van Koijck from Dordrecht. Schmerling studied medicine in Delft and Leiden. Afterwards he served as physician in the Dutch army between 1812 and 1816. On 17 October 1821 in Venlo he married Elizabeth Douglas. They had two daughters, in 1823 and 1825.

In 1822, Schmerling and his wife moved to Liège at which university he continued his studies and became Doctor of Medicine in 1825. His doctoral dissertation was on the subject De studii psychologiae in medicina utilitate et necessitate.

In 1829 he excavated fossils in what are now named the Schmerling Caves, in the region of Flémalle, in the Meuse valley, between Liège and Huy. Schmerling investigated about sixty calcareous caves of the provinces of Liège and Luxembourg during the following years.

He became correspondent of the Royal Institute of the Netherlands in September 1836.

== Works ==
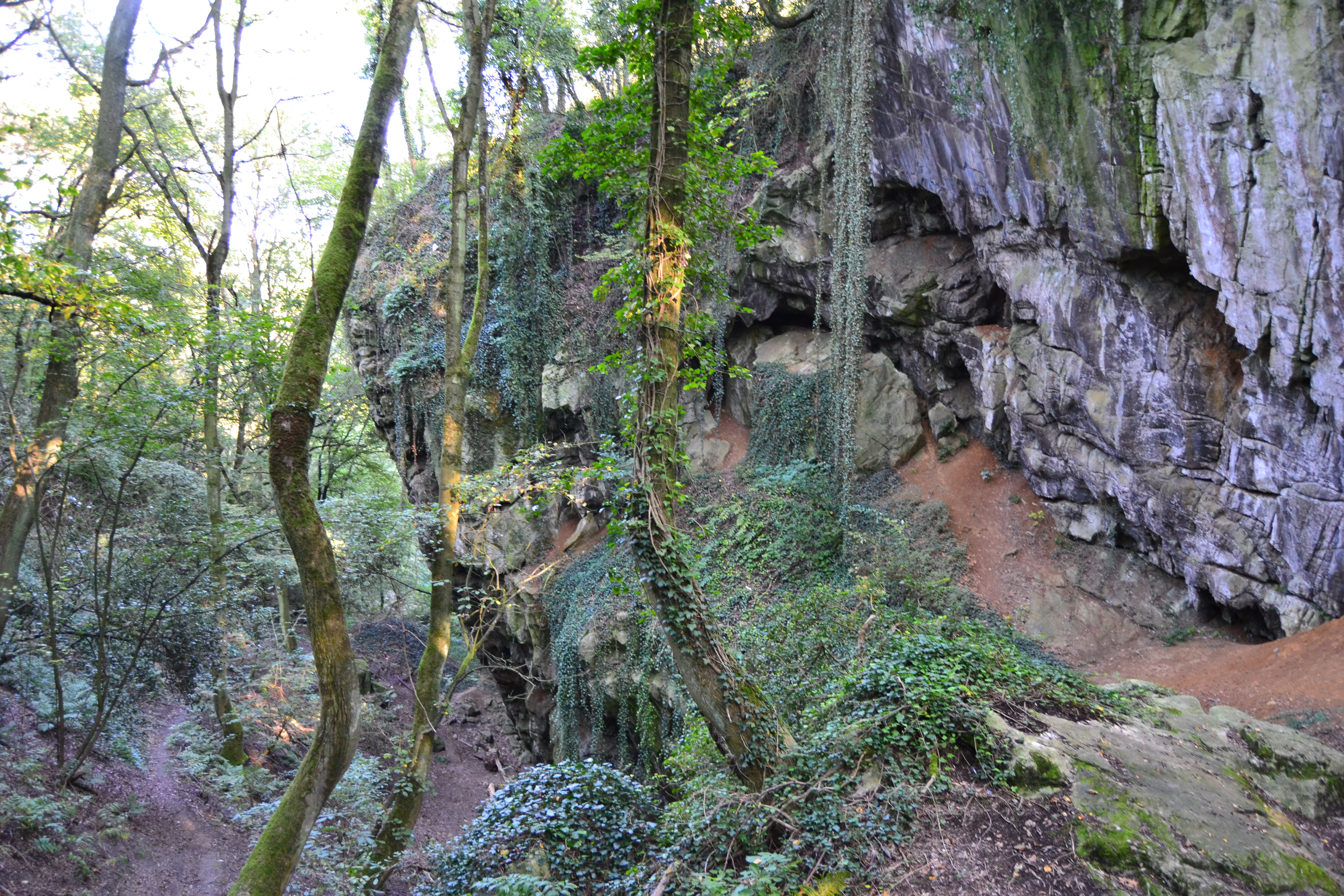
The cliff of the caves where the fossil remains were found

- De studii psychologiae in medicina utilitate et necessitate, Liège, 1825;
- « Cavernes à ossemens fossiles, découvertes jusqu’à ce jour dans la province de Liège » dans Philippe Vandermaelen, Dictionnaire géographique de la province de Liège, Bruxelles, Établissement géographique, 1831, p. 3-7 des annexes;
- Quelques observations sur la teinture de colchique et principalement sur son emploi dans les affections arthritiques et rhumatismales, Liège, P.J. Collardin, 1832;
- « Sur une caverne à ossemens de la province de Liége » dans le Bulletin de la Société géologique de France, t. III, 1833, p. 217-222;
- « Ueber die Knochenhölen bei Lüttich » dans Neues Jahrbuch für Mineralogie, Geognosie, Geologie und Petrefaktenkunde, 1, 1833, p. 38-48;
- Recherches sur les ossements fossiles découverts dans les cavernes de la Province de Liège, Liège, P.J. Collardin, 1833-1834;
- « Renseignements sur la caverne à ossements dite le trou de Hogheur, dans le Luxembourg » dans le Bulletin de l’Académie royale des sciences et belles-lettres de Belgique, t. II, 1835, p. 271-275;
- « Mémoire sur les ossemens fossiles à l'état pathologique, recueillis dans les cavernes de la province de Liège » dans Bulletins de l'Académie royale des Sciences et Belles-Lettres de Bruxelles, t. 2, 1835, p. 362-364;
- « Description des ossemens fossiles à l'état pathologique, provenant des cavernes de la province de Liége » dans Bulletin de la Société géologique de France, t. 7, 1835, p. 51-61;
- « Notice sur quelques os de pachydermes découverts dans le terrain meuble près du village de Chokier » dans le Bulletin de l’Académie royale des sciences et belles-lettres de Belgique, t. III, 1836, p. 82.

== See also ==
- Neanderthal
- Engis 2
- Neanderthal 1
- Discovery of human antiquity
