= Neanderthal 1 =

Neanderthal fossils

Feldhofer 1
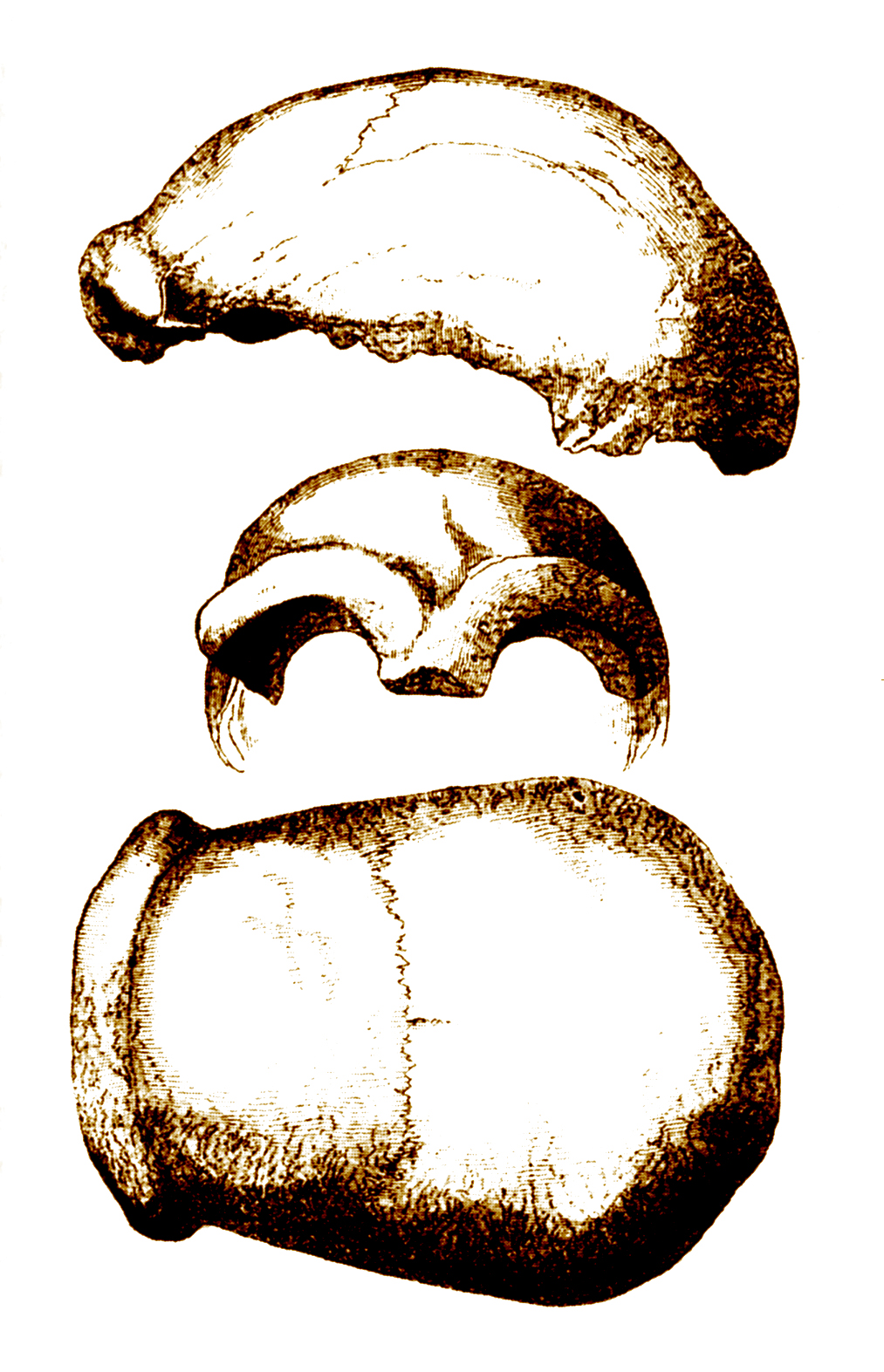
- Type specimen, Neanderthal 1
- Common name: Feldhofer 1
- Species: Neanderthal
- Age: 40,000 years
- Place discovered: Erkrath, North Rhine-Westphalia, Germany
- Date discovered: August 1856

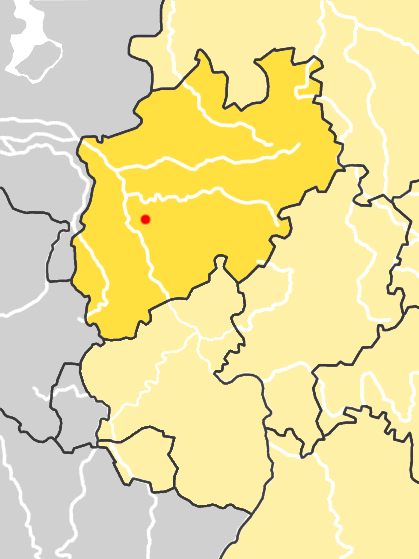
Location of Neander Valley, Germany

Feldhofer 1 or Neanderthal 1 is the scientific name of the 40,000-year-old type specimen fossil of the species Homo neanderthalensis. The fossil was discovered in August 1856 in the Kleine Feldhofer Grotte cave in the Neander Valley (Neandertal), located 13 km (8.1 mi) east of Düsseldorf, Germany.

In 1864, the fossil's description was first published in a scientific journal, where it was officially named. Neanderthal 1 was not the first Neanderthal fossil ever discovered. Other Neanderthal fossils had been found earlier but were not recognized as belonging to a distinct species.

== Discovery ==
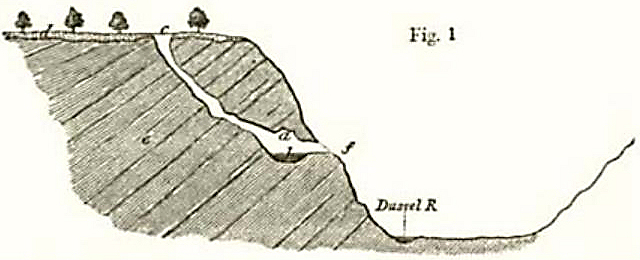
Kleine Feldhofer Grotte (cross-section); from: Charles Lyell (1863): The Geological Evidences of the Antiquity of Man.

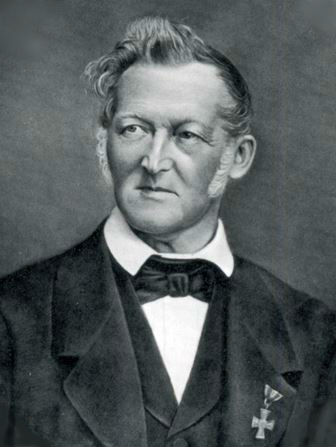
Johann Carl Fuhlrott

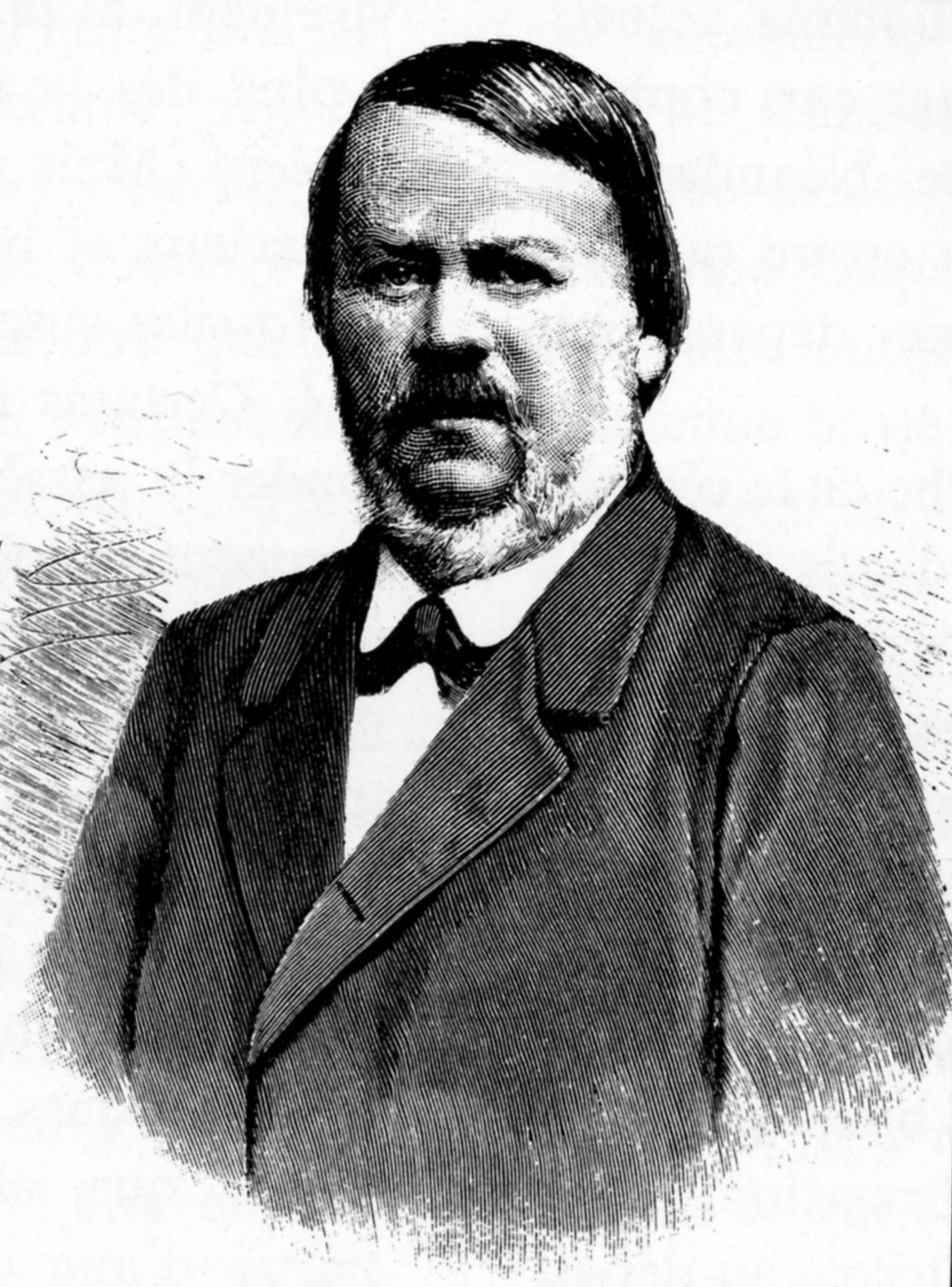
Hermann Schaaffhausen

Limestone has been mined in the Neander Valley since the early 16th century. By the mid-19th century, mining operations had expanded to an industrial scale. In August 1856, two Italian workers extended the entrance to the Kleine Feldhofer Grotte by removing the naturally sintered, rock-hard clay layers embedded in the limestone of the cave. During the removal of the sediment fillings, the workers unearthed fossilized bones at a depth of 60 cm (24 in). Initially unnoticed, the bones were discarded among the mud and debris and scattered throughout the valley.

The discovery came to the attention of the cave's owner, Wilhelm Beckershoff, who assumed the bones belonged to a cave bear. Beckershoff, along with quarry co-owner Friedrich Wilhelm Pieper, retrieved 16 bones and fragments from the rubble and handed them to Elberfeld teacher and fossil collector Johann Carl Fuhlrott. Among the preserved remains were a skullcap with a fragment of the left temporal bone, a fragment of the right scapula, a right clavicle, both humeri (with the right side intact), a complete right radius, fragments of the right and left forearm bones, five ribs, an almost complete left half of the pelvis, and both femora.

Fuhlrott reportedly recognized immediately that the remains belonged to a human who significantly differed from modern humans. Without his consent, a notice was published on September 4, 1856, in the Elberfeld newspaper and the Barmer Local Journal:

In neighboring Neanderthal, a surprising discovery was made in recent days. The removal of the limestone rocks, which certainly is a dreadful deed from a picturesque point of view, revealed a cave that had been filled with mud-clay over the centuries. While clearing away this clay, a human skeleton was found. Undoubtedly, it would have been ignored and lost if not for the timely intervention of Dr. Fuhlrott of Elberfeld, who secured and examined the find. Examination of the skeleton, particularly the skull, suggests it belonged to the tribe of the Flat Heads, which still exists in the American West and of which several skulls have been found in recent years on the upper Danube in Sigmaringen. Perhaps this find can help determine whether the skeleton belonged to an early central European native or simply to one of Attila's roaming horde.

This report drew the attention of two Bonn professors of anatomy, Hermann Schaaffhausen and August Franz Josef Karl Mayer. They contacted Fuhlrott and requested to examine the bones. Fuhlrott personally brought the remains to Bonn during the winter, where Schaaffhausen conducted an investigation. On June 2, 1857, Schaaffhausen and Fuhlrott presented their findings to the members of the Natural History Society of the Prussian Rhineland and Westphalia. Paleoanthropologist Ian Tattersall summarized their findings:

Here, Fuhlrott summarized the history of the discovery, based on a careful survey of the workers who had excavated the finds. He emphasized the age of the bones, evident from the thickness of the overlying strata [...] as well as from the strong mineralization and dendrite formation on the surface, also present in the bones of extinct giant cave bears. Schaaffhausen described and interpreted the find.

Schaaffhausen noted the unusually massive bone structure, particularly the cranium’s low, sloping forehead and prominent brow ridges:

He considered these characteristics natural rather than pathological or the result of abnormal development. These traits reminded him of the great apes. However, this was not an ape. If the features were not pathological, they must have been due to the age of the remains. [...] Although Schaaffhausen's own search for comparable specimens was unsuccessful, he concluded that the bones belonged to a native tribe that had inhabited Germany before the arrival of modern humans.

Schaaffhausen published his findings in 1858 in the Archives of Anatomy, Physiology, and Scientific Medicine. A year later, Fuhlrott published a Treatise on Human Remains from a Rock Grotto of the Düssel Valley in the journal of the Natural History Society of the Prussian Rhineland and Westphalia. In this essay, Fuhlrott cautiously suggested that the bones likely originated from "prehistoric times, probably from the diluvial period, and therefore belonged to an archetypal individual of our race." Reflecting on the geological context, he speculated that the remains might be "ante-diluvial" (pre-dating the biblical flood), representing fossilized humans.

Fuhlrott’s and Schaaffhausen’s interpretations, although ultimately correct, were not initially taken seriously by many scholars. When Fuhlrott published his treatise in 1859, the editorial committee of the Natural History Society of the Prussian Rhineland and Westphalia added a dismissive postscript, noting that he had "put forward views that cannot be shared."

== Historical background ==
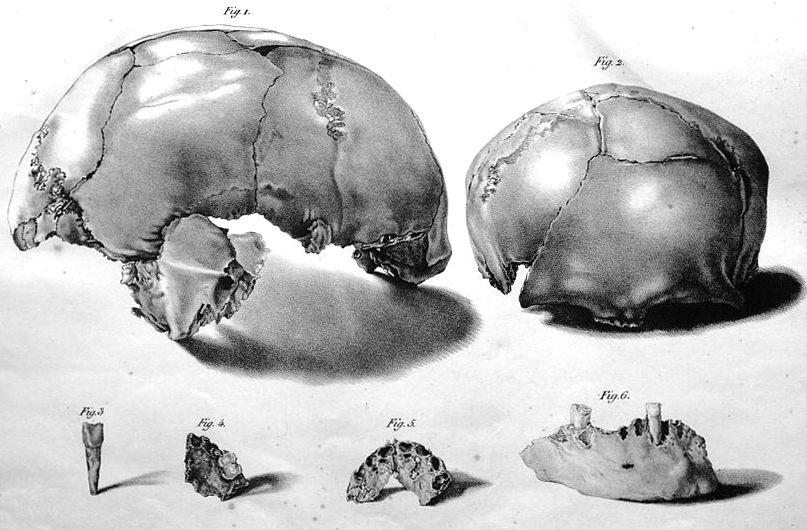
Fossil finds of 1829 Engis 2

In 1758, Carl Linnaeus published the 10th edition of his work, Systema Naturae. The name Homo sapiens was introduced as a species designation, but without a detailed diagnosis or precise description of the species-specific characteristics.

In 1833, the Dutch physician and naturalist Philippe-Charles Schmerling described a fossil skull and several other bones discovered in 1829 in a cave near the Belgian municipality of Engis. He deduced their age by comparing them with animal fossils and stone tools found in the same strata, associating them with the Pleistocene. However, this first scientifically described Neanderthal fossil was misunderstood by his contemporaries as "modern." It lacked the criteria to clearly differentiate fossil species of the genus Homo from Homo sapiens. Furthermore, many of Schmerling's colleagues referenced the Bible (Genesis 1), arguing that fossils of such antiquity could not be reliably identified.

Even Thomas Henry Huxley, a supporter of Darwin's theory of evolution, viewed the Engis find as representing a "man of low degree of civilization." Huxley also interpreted the Neandertal find as falling within the range of variation observed in modern humans. Gibraltar 1, a relatively well-preserved skull discovered in 1848 at the Forbes limestone quarry in Gibraltar, was only decades later recognized as tens of thousands of years old and established as a representative of Homo neanderthalensis.

Like Huxley, anthropologists of the late 19th and early 20th centuries often classified the increasingly numerous hominid fossils as representatives of early "races" of modern humans.

== Subject of scholarly debate ==
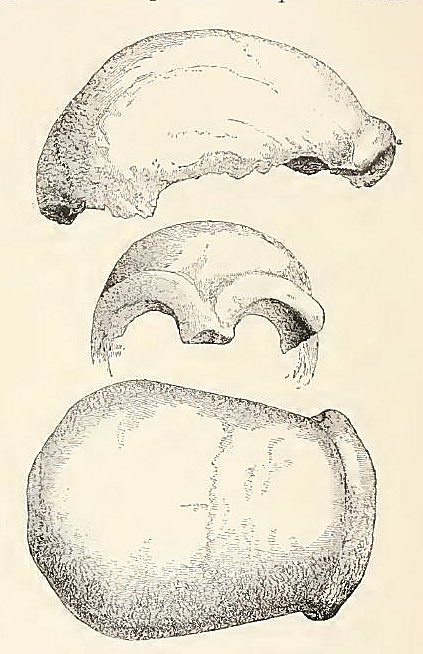
Thomas Henry Huxley, Evidence as to Man's Place in Nature, London, 1863

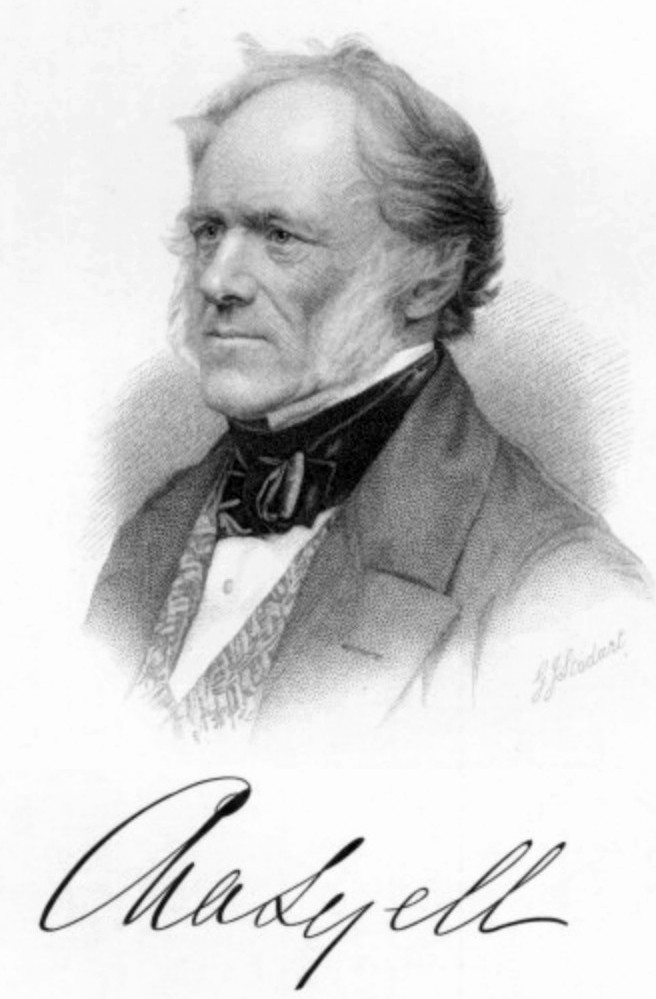
Charles Lyell

The fossil of the Neanderthal was discovered in 1856, three years before the publication of Darwin's seminal work, On the Origin of Species. However, the scientific debate over whether species are immutable or mutable had already been ongoing for a considerable time. In an 1853 treatise on the durability and transformation of species, Hermann Schaaffhausen suggested:

...that species were not immortal, that they have, just like the life of an individual, a beginning, a time of flourishing, and a period of decline—albeit over much longer time intervals. Furthermore, the various life forms differ greatly in their lifespan.

Schaaffhausen, who also emphasized the anatomical and physiological similarities between humans and anthropoid apes, concluded in his summary:

...the immutability of species, which most researchers consider a law of nature, has not yet been proven.

However, Schaaffhausen was not a significant scientific authority in mid-19th-century Germany, where the biological sciences were dominated by Rudolf Virchow. Virchow, often called "...the father of modern cell biology," opposed evolutionary thought for political reasons. Virchow championed socialist ideals and advocated for a society where an individual’s future was determined by their skills, not their origins. To him, the theory of evolution represented a form of elitism incompatible with these ideals.

Virchow first saw the Neanderthal bones in person in 1872. Until then, he had left their study to Bonn anatomist and ophthalmologist August Franz Josef Karl Mayer, a staunch supporter of the traditional Christian belief in creationism. Mayer, who missed the initial evaluation of the fossils during the winter of 1856/57 due to illness, later published his interpretations:

He attributed the Neanderthal's "rickety" bone changes to pathological development. Mayer argued that the thigh and pelvic bones were shaped like those of someone who had spent their life on horseback. The individual’s poorly healed broken right arm and permanent worry lines, caused by enduring pain, explained the pronounced brow ridges. Mayer speculated that the skeleton belonged to a mounted Russian Cossack who had roamed the area during the wars of liberation against Napoleon.

Mayer's interpretations, published in 1864 in the Archive of Anatomy, dismissed the signs of rickets (weakened bones) despite the Neanderthal's remarkably strong bone structure. Nevertheless, Virchow largely agreed with Mayer's anatomical findings, describing the bones as a "remarkable individual phenomenon" and a "plausible individual formation." Consequently, for years in German-speaking countries, the Neanderthal fossils were regarded as pathological variations of modern human skeletons.

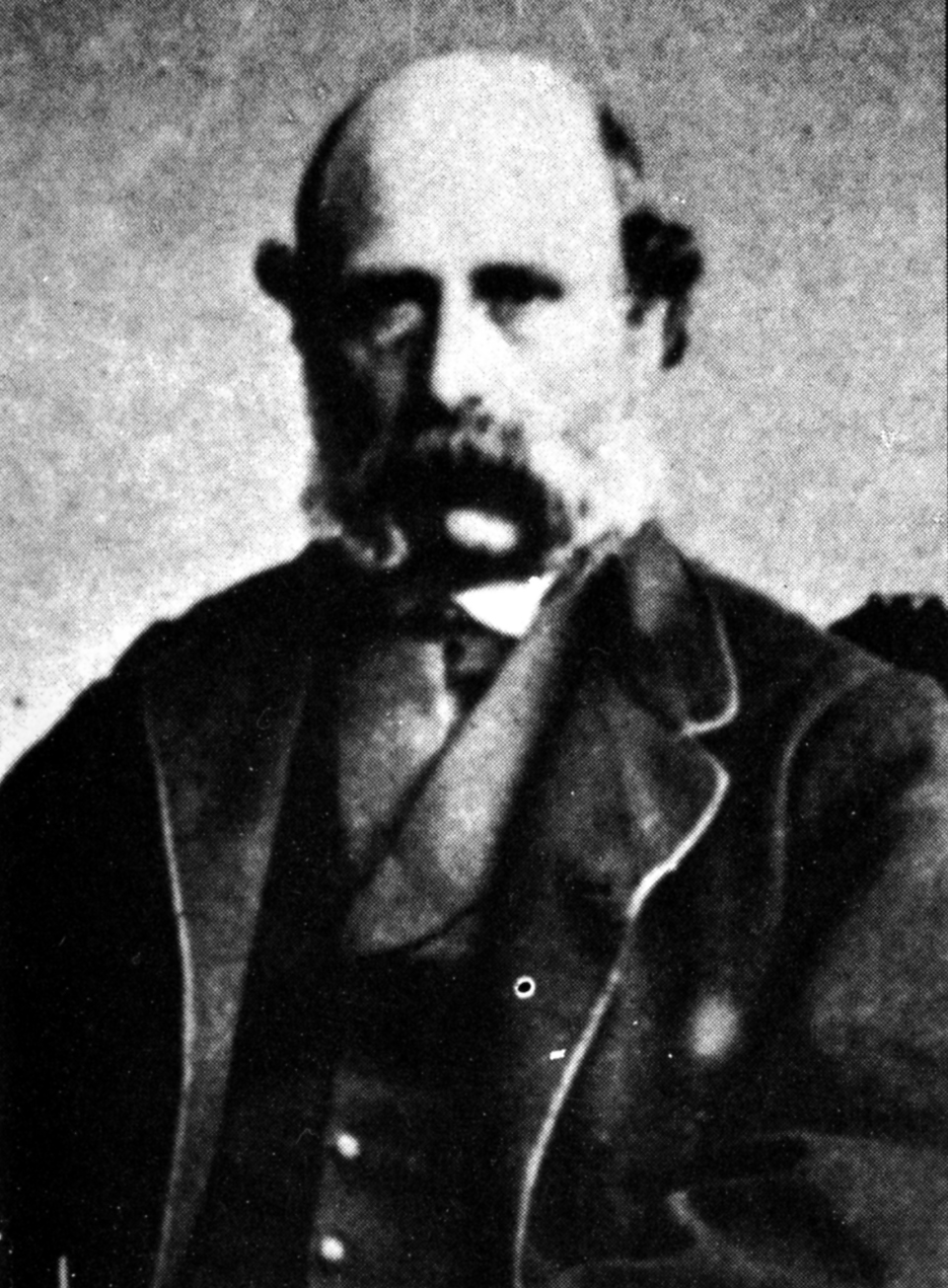
William King

Even the accurate assessment of geologist Charles Lyell in 1863, which confirmed the antiquity of the fossils after his visit to Fuhlrott and the Neandertal site, did not shift prevailing views. However, with hindsight, the turning point toward recognizing the Neanderthal fossil as distinct occurred in 1863/64.

In 1864, Irish geologist William King published a detailed description of the Neanderthal fossil, emphasizing its ape-like characteristics due to the lack of comparative evidence. At the conclusion of his essay, King formally proposed the name "Homo Neanderthalensis" in a footnote, marking the fossil as distinct from modern humans. This casual designation later became the species' official name under the international rules for zoological nomenclature.

In 1863, British paleontologist George Busk, who had translated Schaaffhausen's treatise into English in 1861, acquired the Gibraltar 1 skull discovered in 1848 in the Forbes' Quarry. Noting its similarity to Neandertal 1, he remarked that even Mayer would struggle to argue "that a rickety Cossack of 1814 would have holed up in the clefts of the rock of Gibraltar."

Final recognition that Neanderthals were a distinct species separate from Homo sapiens came only after 1886, following the discovery of two nearly complete Neanderthal skeletons in the Spy Cave in Belgium.

== Anthropological analysis ==
The 19th-century discussion initially focused on reconciling the anthropological findings with the characteristics of Homo sapiens. Johann Carl Fuhlrott first observed the unusual massiveness of the bones, noting prominent bumps, ridges, and ledges that indicated the attachment of highly developed muscles. He also identified a healed injury on one of the humerus bones.

William King similarly highlighted the exceptional thickness of the skeletal remains and agreed with Hermann Schaaffhausen's observations, which included the strongly rounded shape of the ribs, suggesting an unusual thorax structure for a human. King's primary focus, however, was on the preserved skull bones. He described the skull as "stretched oval" in shape and approximately an inch longer than that of a contemporary British person. While the skull's width was comparable to that of modern humans, the forehead region appeared unusually flat and receding, with "excessively developed" bone ridges above the eyes.

In summarizing these deviations from modern human anatomy, King wrote:

In these general characters, the Neanderthal skull is at once observed to be singularly different from all others which admittedly belong to the human species; and they undoubtedly invest it with a close resemblance to that of a young Chimpanzee.

=== Intravital injuries and illnesses ===
At the beginning of the 21st century, Göttingen pathologist Michael Schultz devoted his research to investigating the health of the Neanderthal holotype, Neanderthal 1. Schultz diagnosed several pathological conditions, including muscle tendon processes, a fracture of the left arm near the elbow joint, and a resulting deformity of the bone. The fracture left a permanent impairment, rendering the arm unusable even after it had healed.

The frontal bone of Neanderthal 1 exhibits a healed injury attributed to a fall onto a sharp stone. Additionally, evidence suggests that Neanderthal 1 experienced a traumatic event leading to a healed bleeding in a circulatory brain vessel. Extensive inflammation of the paranasal sinuses was also observed, with both frontal sinuses showing deformities, hump-like features, and small vascular traces consistent with chronic inflammation.

In advanced age, Neanderthal 1 suffered from a serious condition previously unrecorded in Neanderthals: a metastatic, bone-destroying disease of unknown origin. His age at death has been estimated at 40 to 42 years.

=== Postmortem changes of the skeleton ===
In 1992, alleged cut marks on the skeletal remains were reported, particularly at the edges of the skull, which may suggest a specific burial rite. Given the rudimentary state of conservation of the skeleton (16 of 203 bones), it is also possible that tooth scratches caused by carnivores contributed to these marks. However, considering the superficial and non-scientific recovery of the bones, the issue of disarticulation (the dispersion of skeletal remains by predators) remains difficult to resolve.

== Excavations of 1997 and 2000 ==
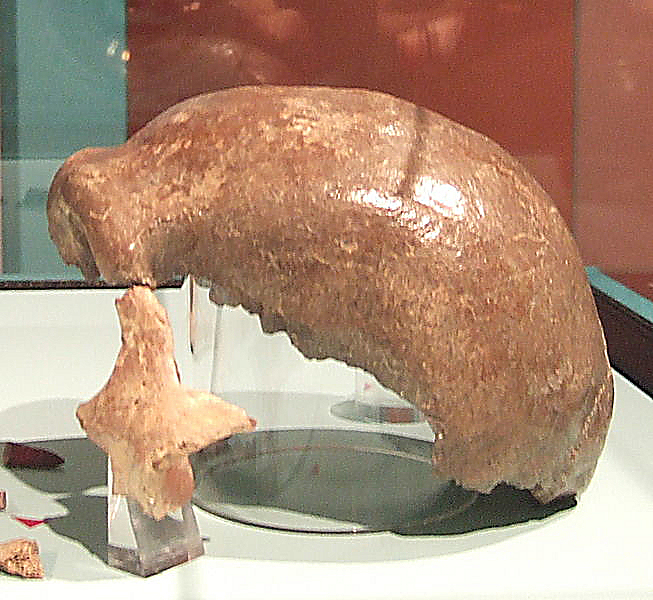
Neanderthal 1, lateral view, front/left: the pieces of the temporal and zygomatic bone discovered in 2000

From 1991 onward, the Neanderthal bones were re-analyzed by an international team of researchers. Radiocarbon dating yielded an age of 39,900 ± 620 years, suggesting that these individuals belonged to the last populations of Neanderthals in Europe. In 1997, the research team succeeded in extracting mitochondrial DNA from the humerus of the type specimen, marking the first sample of Neanderthal mtDNA ever obtained. However, the results were interpreted cautiously in the initial analysis. Despite this, the evidence led to the conclusion that Neanderthals were genetically distinct from anatomically modern humans. The title of the Cell journal issue read: "Neanderthals were not our ancestors." The subsequent decoding of the Neanderthal genome in 2010 tempered this conclusion (see section below).

In 1997, excavations at the Neander Valley identified and reconstructed the precise location of the former "Little Feldhofer Grotto". Beneath layers of residue, loam fillings, and blasting rubble from the limestone quarry, a number of stone tools and over 20 Neanderthal bone fragments were discovered. Prior to this, no stone tools had been found in the cave. Excavations continued in 2000, and a further 40 human teeth and bone fragments were uncovered, including a piece of the temporal bone and the zygomatic bone, which fit precisely into the Neanderthal 1 skull. Another bone fragment was matched to the left femur.

Particular attention was given to the discovery of a third humerus: two humeri had been known since 1856. The third humerus belonged to a second, more delicately built individual. At least three other bone fragments were also found in duplicate. This individual, referred to as Neandertal 2, was dated at 39,240 ± 670 years, exactly the same age as Neanderthal 1. Additionally, a milk tooth was recovered and attributed to an adolescent Neanderthal. In 2004, it was stolen from the Neanderthal Museum in Erkrath, but was returned shortly thereafter. Based on the state of abrasion and the partially dissolved dental roots, it was concluded that the tooth belonged to a juvenile aged 11 to 14 years.

The site was transformed into an archaeological garden, with installations symbolizing the eventful history of the area. The park is part of the neighboring Neanderthal Museum, which showcases a chronological overview of human evolution.

== Relation to modern man ==
A 2008 study by the Max Planck Institute for Evolutionary Anthropology in Leipzig suggested that Neanderthals probably did not interbreed with anatomically modern humans, while the Neanderthal genome project published in 2010 and 2014 suggests that Neanderthals did contribute to the DNA of modern humans, including most non-Africans and a few African populations, through interbreeding, likely between 50,000 and 60,000 years ago.

== See also ==
- Dawn of Humanity (2015 PBS documentary)
- Engis 2
- Gibraltar 1
- List of fossil sites (with link directory)
- List of human evolution fossils (with images)
- Mauer 1
- Neanderthal
- Neanderthals of Gibraltar
- Origins of Us (2011 BBC documentary)
- Prehistoric Autopsy (2012 BBC documentary)
- The Incredible Human Journey (2009 BBC documentary)
