= Kleine Feldhofer Grotte =

Former cave and archaeological site in Neandertal, Germany

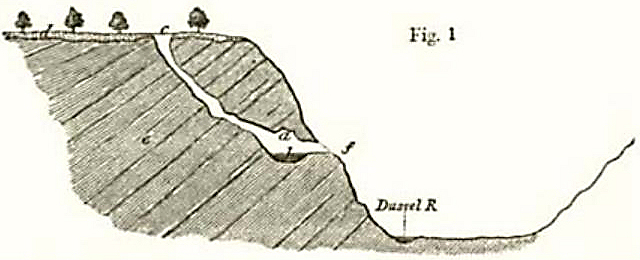
- Drawing from Charles Lyell's Geological Evidences of the Antiquity of Man (1863)

- Location in Germany Kleine Feldhofer Grotte (Germany)
- 51°13′39″N 6°56′44″E
- Type: Karst cave
- Associated with: Homo neanderthalensis
- Location: Near Erkrath town
- Region: Neandertal, North Rhine-Westphalia, Germany

Kleine Feldhofer Grotte was a karstic limestone cave and a paleoanthropologic site in the Neander Valley in western Germany. In August 1856, the Neanderthal type specimen was unearthed from the cave. Miners uncovered a skull cap and a number of skeletal bones to be labeled Neanderthal. The bones belong to at least three distinct individuals.

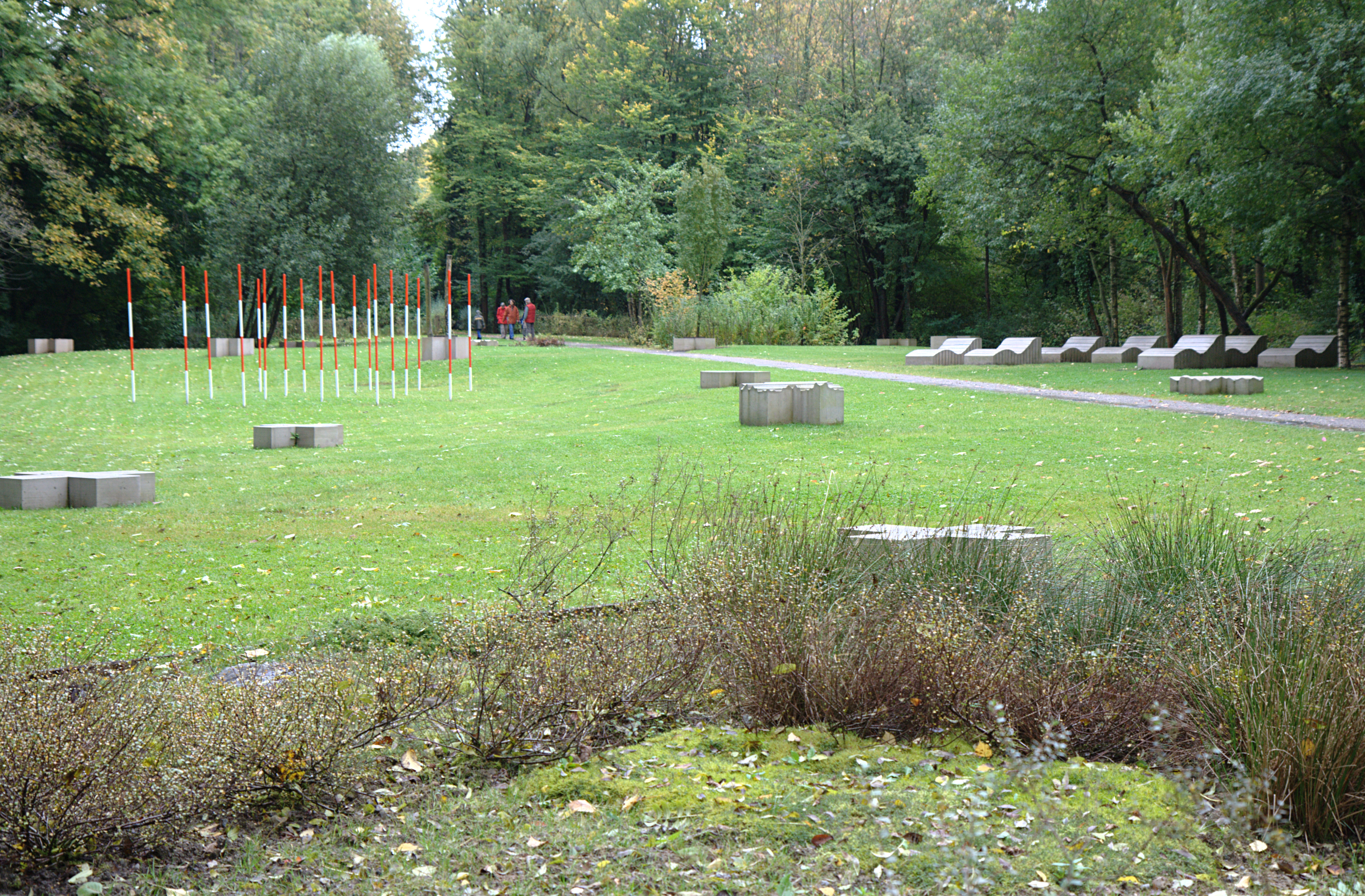
The 1997/2000 excavation site, now an "Archaeological Garden"

The cave was situated in a limestone gorge with the interior dimensions of 3 m (9.8 ft) in width by 5 m (16 ft) in length by 3 m (9.8 ft) in height, and a 1 m (3.3 ft) opening 20 m (66 ft) above the valley floor in the south wall which was 50 m (160 ft) high. The cave got its name from the nearby large farm of the Feldhof.

The cave was destroyed during the 19th century as a result of industrial-scale limestone quarrying which widened the gorge. The location of the cave was soon forgotten and by 1900, unknown.

In 1997 a successful search for the site of the cave and its deposits yielded 24 fragments of human bone, one of which, identified as NN 13, fit exactly onto the left lateral femoral condyle of the Neanderthal 1 fossil. The 2000 excavation resulted in the recovery of thousands of artifacts. The mitochondrial DNA of two bone samples were fully sequenced, and completed in 2009.

In recent years a 25-meter tower has been built to take visitors from the floor of the quarried-out valley to the height of the original cave, and a reconstruction of the Neanderthal bones placed at the top.

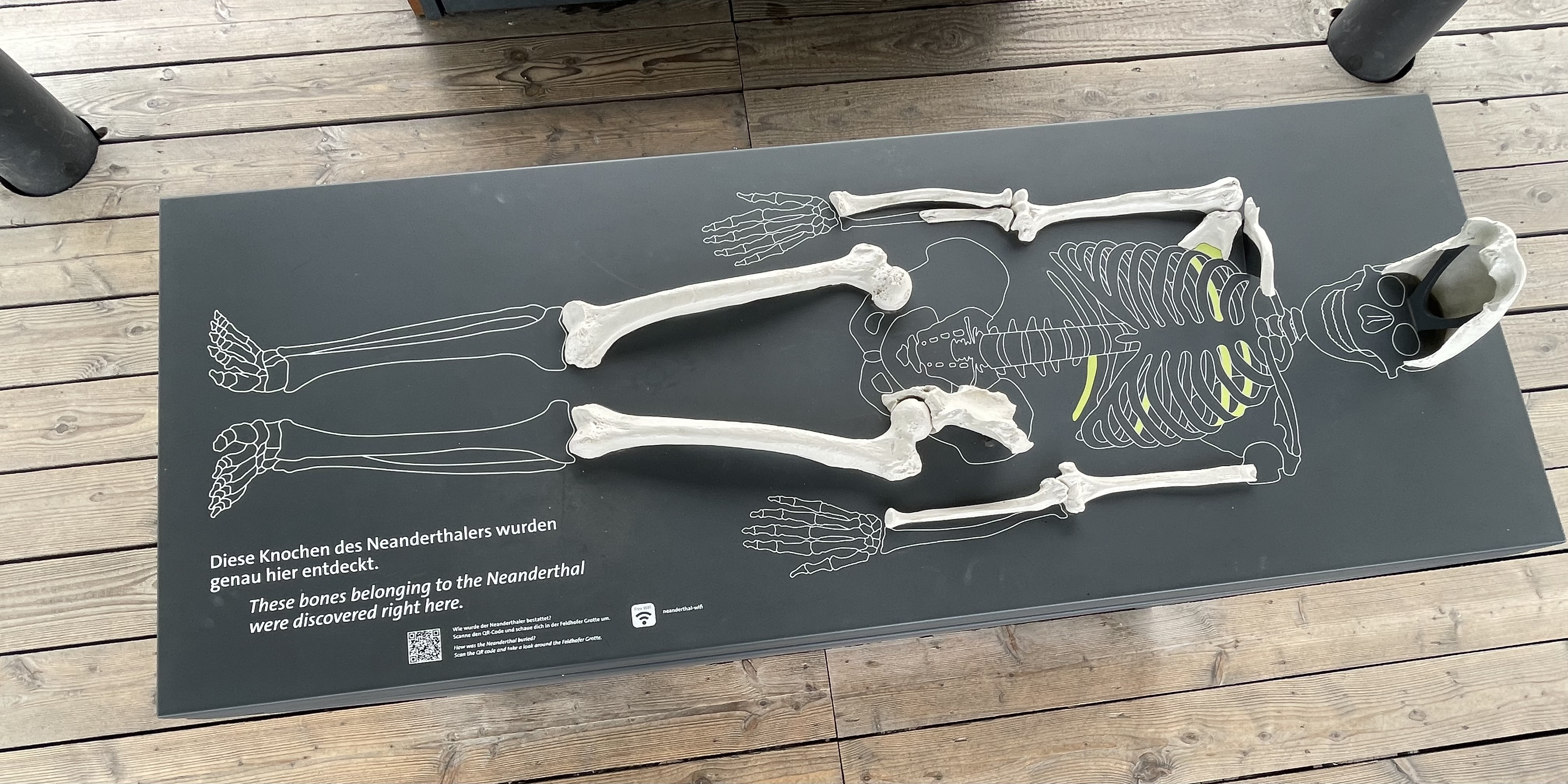
Reconstruction of the skeleton, now displayed at original site of the Feldhofer Grotte
