= William King (geologist) =

Anglo-Irish geologist

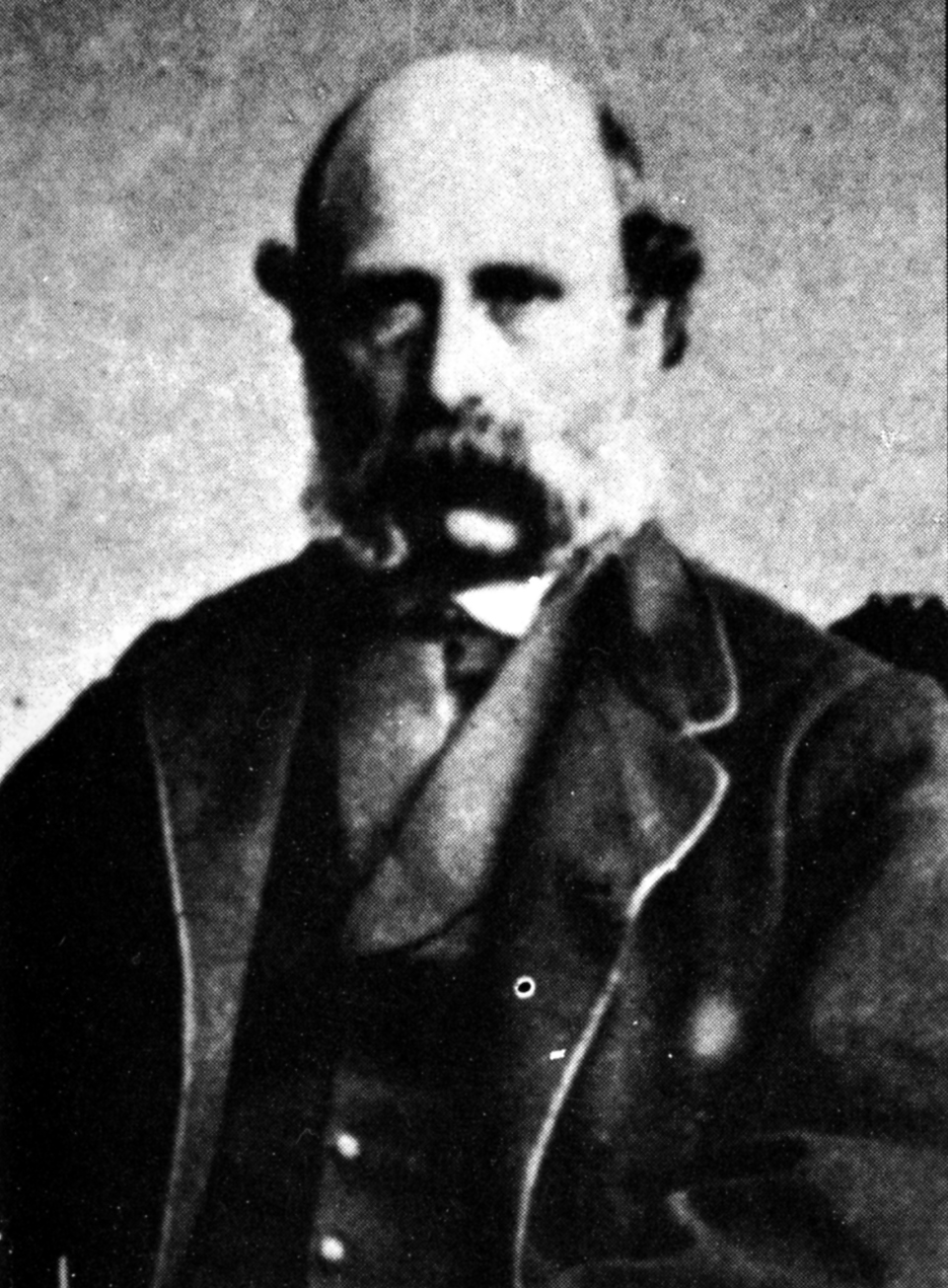
William King

William King (22 April 1809 – 24 June 1886), was an Anglo-Irish geologist at Queen's College Galway. He was the first (in 1864) to propose that the bones found in the German valley of Neanderthal in 1856 were not of Homo sapiens, but of a distinct species: Homo neanderthalensis. He proposed the name of this new species at a meeting of the British Association in 1863, with the written version published in 1864.

== Life ==
King was born to William King, a coal worker, and his wife Eleanor née Armstrong who was a confectioner and shop owner. He grew up in Durham and went to study in Sunderland and apprenticed at various times with an ironmonger, book-seller and a librarian. He took an early interest in collecting fossils. He worked at the Newcastle museum in 1841 but left it after six years after conflict with the employers.

In 1849 he joined Queen's College Galway and during his long career there published nearly 70 papers and established a museum. He developed a course in geology for the arts, agriculture, and engineering faculties and served as an examiner in geology for the University. His research included topics such as the structure of the brachiopod shell, rock cleavage and the uplift of the Burren. His most famous work was The reputed fossil man of the Neanderthal published in 1864. In this he noted the differences in the curved ribs, the skull muscle attachment suggesting carnivory and suggested that the Neanderthal was a species different from modern humans. He supported a modified version of Darwin's Origin of Species but he gave considerable emphasis to place the Neanderthal as being close and on a "lower scale" than Andaman and Australian aborigines and suggested that like them, the Neanderthal was "incapable of moral and theoistic conception". His speculation on their theological beliefs did not go without critical comment from contemporaries like Charles Carter Blake.

King married Jane Nicholson in 1839 and one of their sons, William King Jr. worked in the Geological Survey of India, and became its director. King was a fellow of the Geological Society of France and was awarded an honorary D.Sc. by Queen's University in 1870. King resigned in 1883 following a stroke but stayed as an emeritus professor. He died at Glenoir, Galway on 24 June 1886.

King's great-grandson, another William King (1910-2012), was a globe-circumnavigating yachtsman and a Royal Navy officer in World War II.
