= Neandertal (valley) =

Valley in North Rhine-Westphalia, Germany

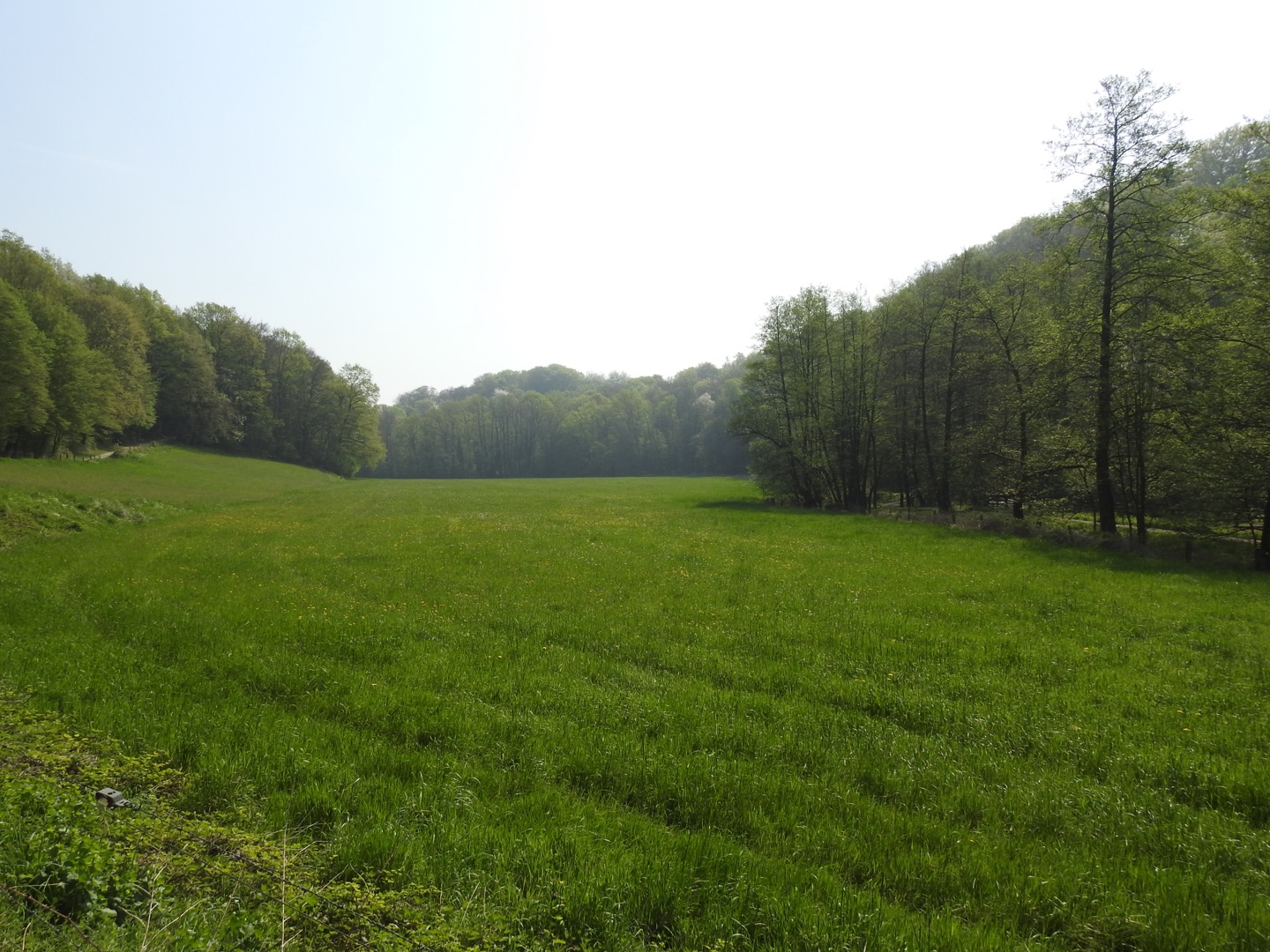
- View of Neandertal

- Location within North Rhine-Westphalia Location within Germany

Geography
- Country: Germany
- State: North Rhine-Westphalia
- Region: Düsseldorf
- District: Mettmann
- Coordinates: 51.226666666667°N 6.9511111111111°E
- River: Düssel

Location
- Interactive map of Neandertal

The Neandertal (/niˈændərˌtɑːl/, also US: /-ˌtɔːl/, German: [neˈʔandɐtʰaːl]; sometimes called "the Neander Valley" in English) is a small valley of the river Düssel in the German state of North Rhine-Westphalia, located about 12 km (7.5 mi) east of Düsseldorf, the capital city of North Rhine-Westphalia. The valley lies within the limits of the towns of Erkrath and Mettmann. In August 1856, the area became famous for the discovery of Neanderthal 1, one of the first specimens of Homo neanderthalensis to be found.

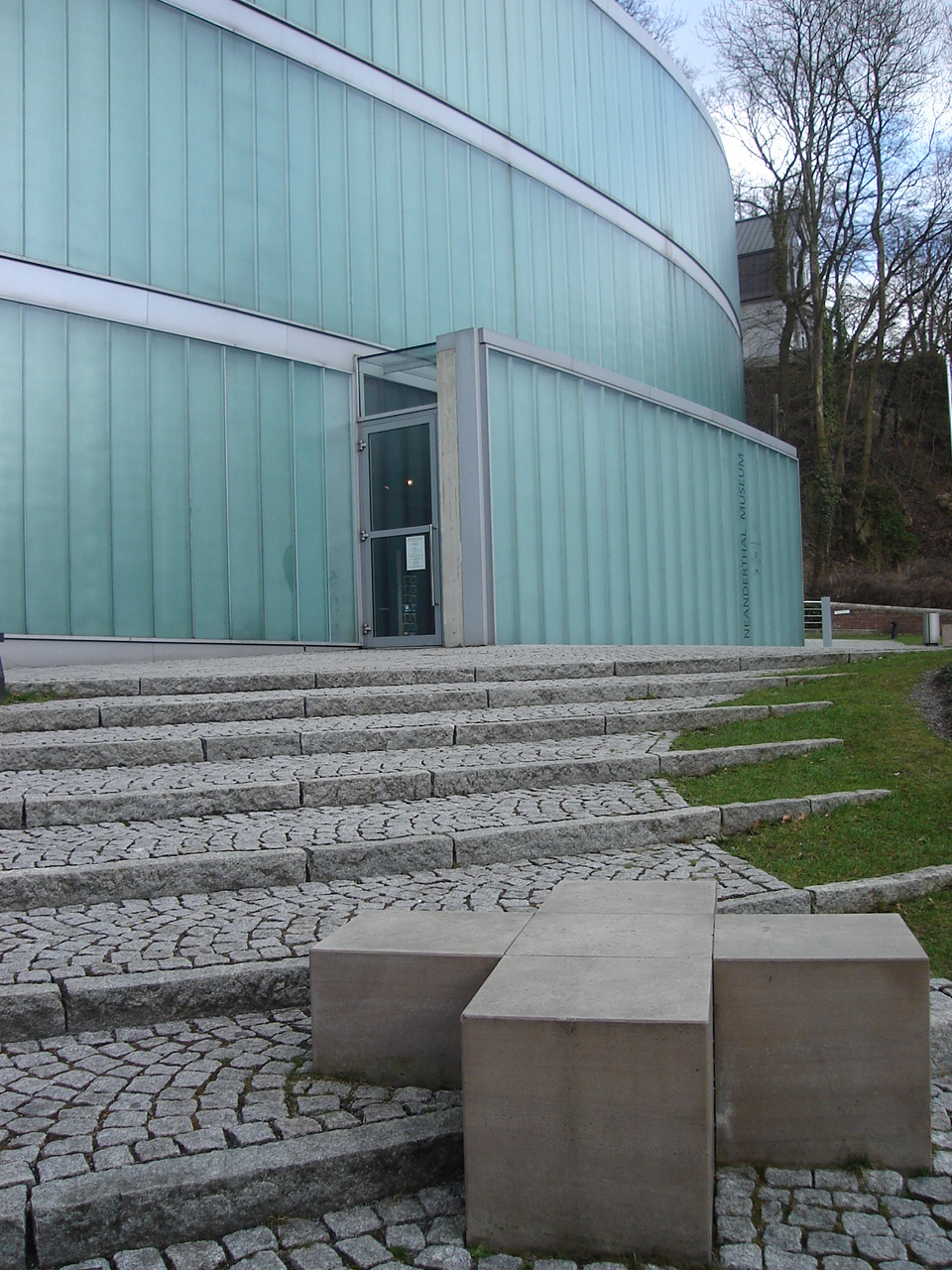
Neanderthal Museum, Mettmann

The Neandertal was originally a limestone canyon widely known for its rugged scenery, waterfalls and caves. However, industrial quarrying during the 19th and 20th centuries removed most of the limestone and dramatically changed the shape of the valley. It was during such a quarrying operation that the bones of the original Neanderthal man were found in a cave known as Kleine Feldhofer Grotte. Neither the cave nor the cliff in which the bones were located still exist.

During the 19th century, the valley was called Neanderhöhle (Neander's Cave) and, after 1850, Neanderthal. It was named after Joachim Neander, a 17th-century German pastor and hymnwriter. Neander is the Graeco-Roman translation of his family name Neumann; both names mean "new man". Neander lived in nearby Düsseldorf and loved the valley for giving him the inspiration for his compositions. Former names of the gorge were Das Gestein (The Boulders) and Das Hundsklipp (Cliff of dogs, perhaps in the sense of "Cliff of Beasts").

In 1901, an orthographic reform in Germany changed the spelling of Thal (valley) to Tal. Scientific names, such as Homo neanderthalensis and Homo sapiens neanderthalensis for Neanderthal remained unchanged, because the laws of taxonomy retain the original spelling at the time of naming. However, Neanderthal station never changed its name to conform with the new German orthography and the modern Neanderthal Museum retains the original spelling.

== Excavations ==
Long after the initial discovery of the Neanderthal specimen from the valley, the discarded deposits from the cave were rediscovered and then excavated in 1997 and 2000. These excavations yielded multiple artifacts and human skeletal fragments. Two cranial fragments seem to fit onto the original Neandertal 1 calotte (bones of the cranial vault). Other pieces include bones or teeth from at least two other individuals, and DNA sequencing has confirmed that one of them was also a Neanderthal. They lived about 40,000 years ago.

== See also ==
- Neanderthal Museum
