= Levant Battery =

Artillery battery in Gibraltar

- Part of Fortifications of Gibraltar
- Upper Rock Nature Reserve, Gibraltar
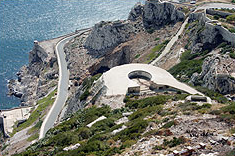
- Levant Battery in Gibraltar

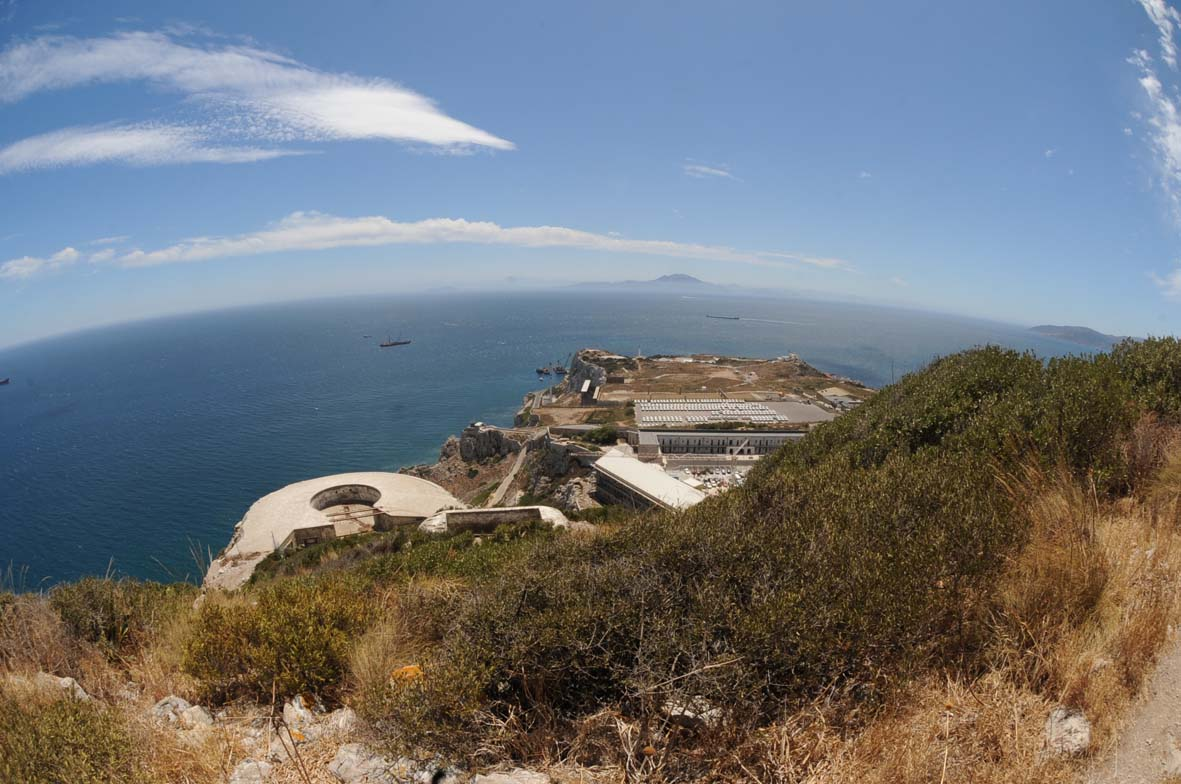
- Levant Battery and Windmill Hill

Site information
- Type: Artillery battery
- Owner: Ministry of Defence

Location
- Location of Levant Battery in Gibraltar
- Coordinates: 36.119943°N 5.343540°W

Site history
- Built: 1901-1903
- In use: Ship decommissioning

Levant Battery is an artillery battery in the British Overseas Territory of Gibraltar. It is located on Windmill Hill, at the southern end of the Upper Rock Nature Reserve, below observation post Fire Control South. It was named after the Levanter cloud, below which it perched, giving it an unobstructed view. Construction started in 1901 and, by 1903, a 9.2-inch Mark X breech-loading gun had been mounted. The battery was decommissioned in the 1970s and the gun was later removed, to rest in a scrap yard. A community group has been formed to garner support for the gun's recovery and restoration.

== Early history ==
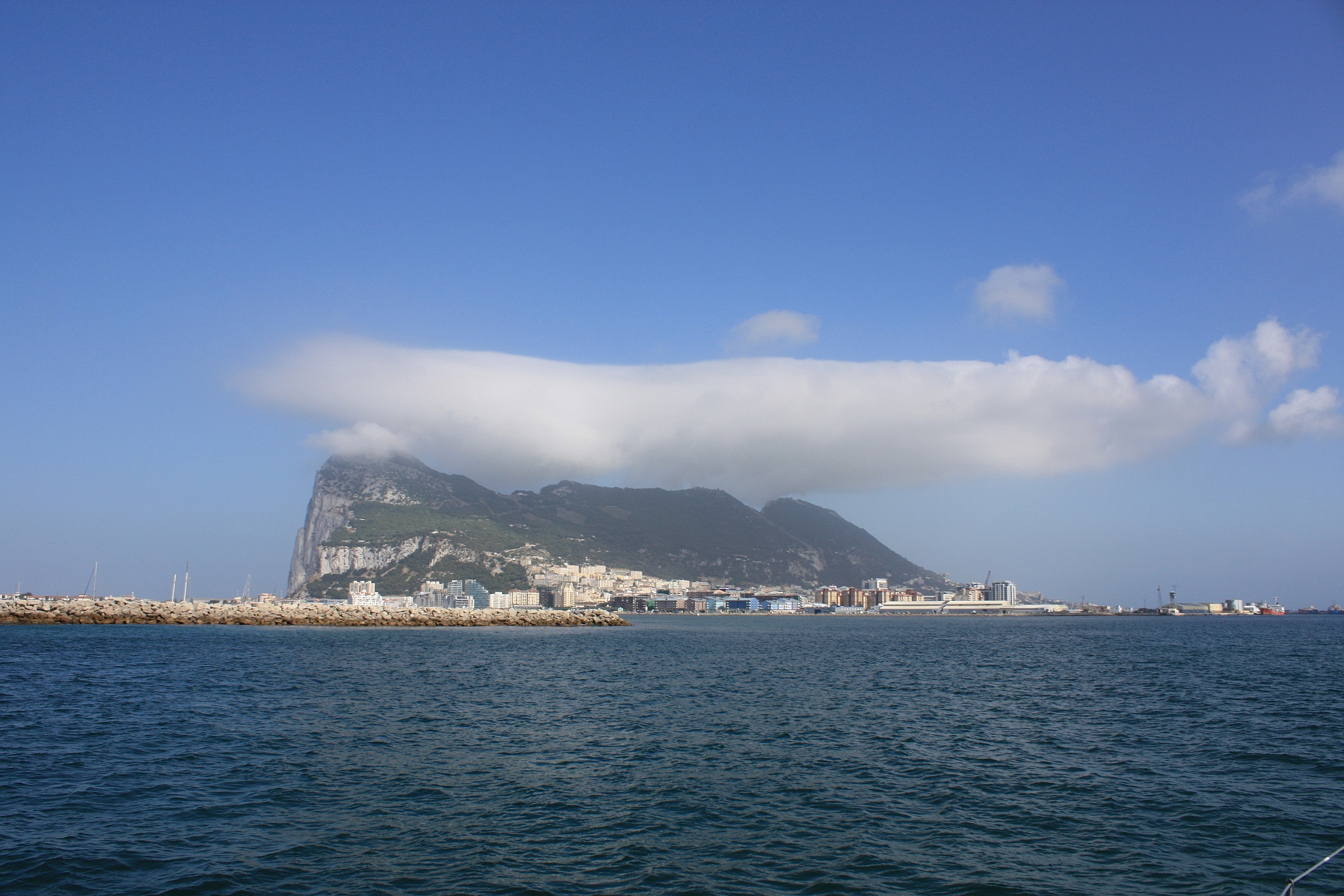
Levanter cloud over Gibraltar

Levant Battery is in Gibraltar, the British Overseas Territory at the southern end of the Iberian Peninsula. The artillery battery is located at the southern end of the Upper Rock Nature Reserve, on Windmill Hill, east of Jews' Gate Cemetery and south of Mediterranean Road (links to maps below). It is positioned below the observation post Fire Control South. Levant Battery was in what was referred to as the Middle South Section. The other emplacements in that section included Edward VII Battery, Genista Battery, Jews' (Gate) Cemetery Battery, Engineer Battery, and Europa Advance Battery. The battery received its name from its position below the Levanter cloud, which afforded it an unobstructed field of view when other, higher batteries were limited by reduced visibility.

Construction of Levant Battery commenced in April 1901. By August 1903, a 9.2-inch Mark X breech-loading gun had been installed on a Mark V mounting. When approval for the battery was granted in 1901, it was anticipated that there would be two weapons, one to target the Mediterranean to the east and the other to bear on Spanish batteries to the west. However, the emplacement was designed as an artillery battery for just one gun, to bear on Mediterranean targets. By 1907, a supply of drinking water for Levant Battery had been provided by connecting it to reservoirs at the Mediterranean Steps. In addition, a water-carriage system for supply of sanitary water was under construction.

On 31 December 1915, German submarines appeared off the Rock of Gibraltar. The 9.2-inch gun at Levant Battery was one of the participants in the attack on the enemy vessels. The records of that day indicate: "Result of action. One target disappeared, and a large explosion took place at another." In the course of practice firing on 23 March 1934, a shell exploded in the barrel, which was replaced on 20 April 1934.

== Previous emplacement ==
In the eighteenth century, another battery on Gibraltar was referred to as the Levant Battery. Woolwich Warren, later known as the Royal Arsenal, was established in the seventeenth century in Woolwich, southeast London. In 1798, its repository of military items included a model of Gibraltar, constructed of rock from that site, on a scale of 25 feet per inch. Gibraltar was described at that time as having its highest point at Levant Battery, represented on the model, 1375 feet above sea level. As construction on the existing Levant Battery did not begin until 1901 and its location does not represent the highest on the rock, a different Levant Battery was present on Gibraltar at the turn of the nineteenth century. This was located near the north front.

== Recent history ==
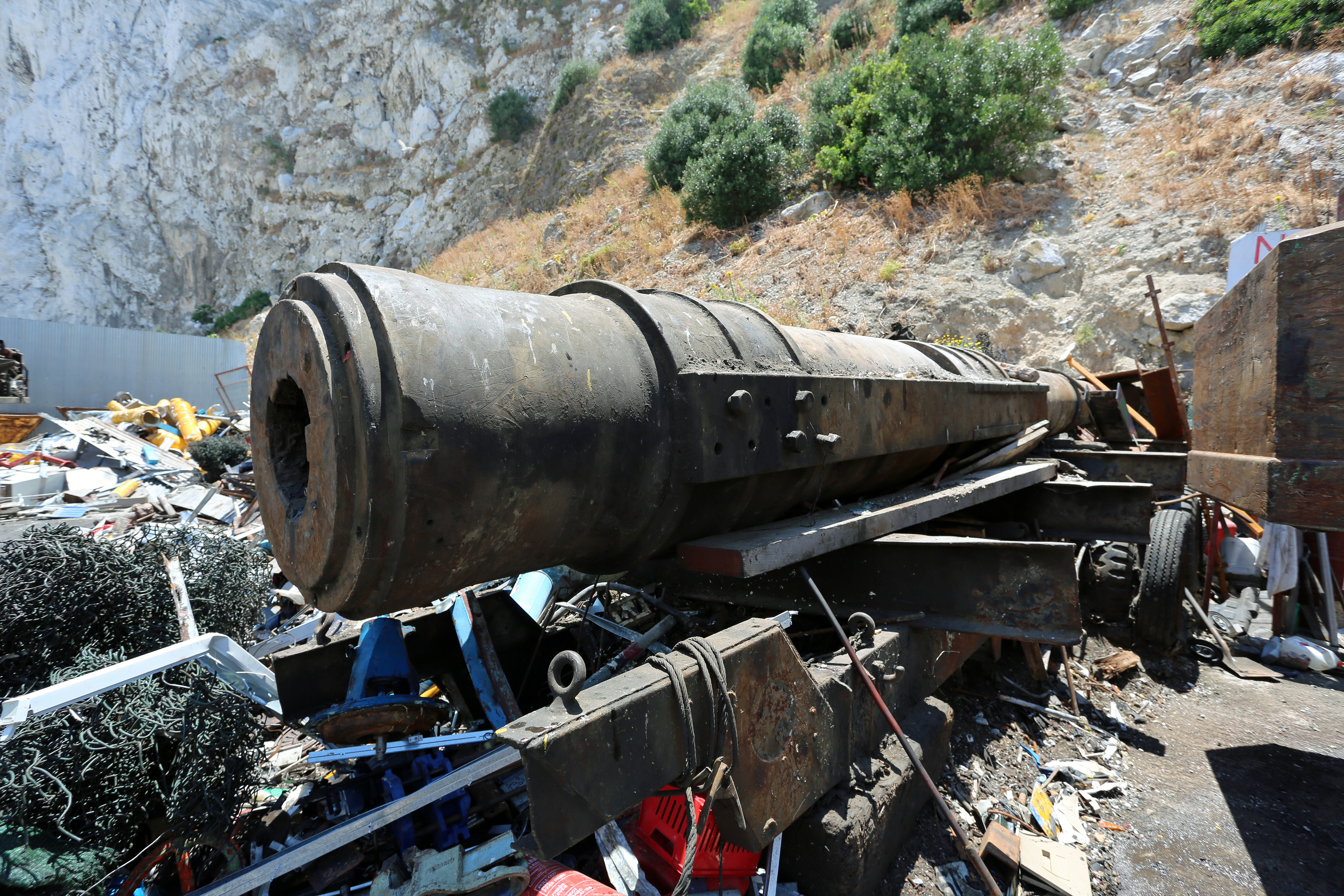
The gun and mount from the Levant Battery in Gibraltar is at Metalrok Limited in Gibraltar. The gun still has its Mark V mount and has been there for about forty years resting on its original trailer.

Gibraltar's surviving 9.2-inch guns were described in After The Battle magazine:

... the crowning glory of the defenses of the Rock are the 9.2-inch guns. Five batteries still remain on the Rock: Levant, Spur, Breakneck, O'Hara's and Lord Airey's Batteries. Of these, only Levant Battery can easily be visited, the others being situated on military property behind locked gates. All of them are single-gun batteries each with a 9.2-inch gun, a type of weapon that was once one of the most important weapons in the British coastal artillery armoury.

For years, Levant Battery was an excluded area, where unauthorised entry by the public was considered a criminal offence. While Breakneck Battery is still closed to the public, the other four batteries are now accessible. In the 1970s, Levant Battery was decommissioned. Later, the 9.2-inch gun was removed. In 1981, the gun at Spur Battery was dismantled and transferred to the Imperial War Museum Duxford in Cambridgeshire, England in the military operation referred to as Project Vitello. In 2010, O'Hara's Battery and Lord Airey's Battery were opened to the public.

In February 2011, a group, later renamed "Save the Levant Battery 9.2 Gun," was founded to increase awareness of the battery's gun and to garner support for its recovery and restoration to either its original site or Harding's Battery, which was exposed and restored in 2010-2011 during the refurbishment of Europa Point. The 9.2-inch gun from Levant Battery now rests in the Metalroc scrap yard on Devil's Tower Road.

== Gallery ==
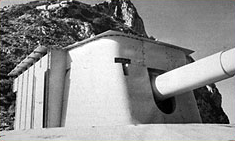
Levant Battery, before removal of gun in the 1970s

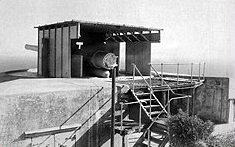
Levant Battery, before removal of gun in the 1970s

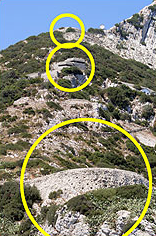
Fire Control South, with Levant Battery (below) and Spur Battery (above)

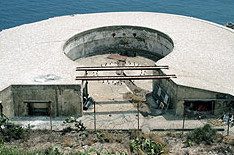
Levant Battery, after removal of gun in the 1970s

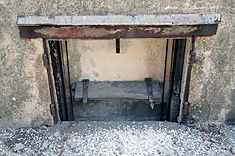
Levant Battery, after removal of gun in the 1970s, shell hoist

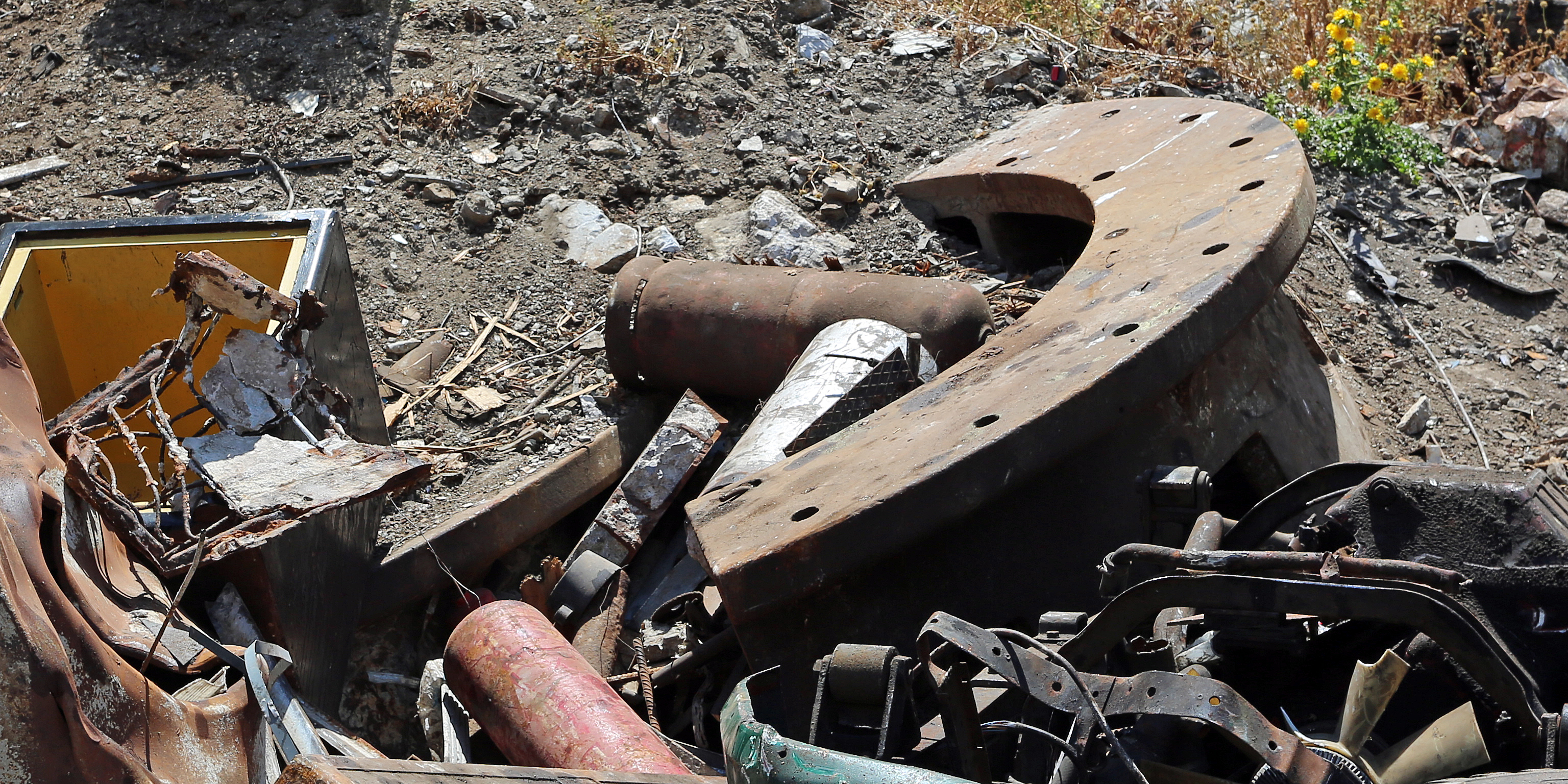
The Mark V gun mount at Metalrok scrapyard
