= Breakneck Battery =

Artillery battery in Gibraltar

- Part of Fortifications of Gibraltar
- Upper Rock Nature Reserve, Gibraltar
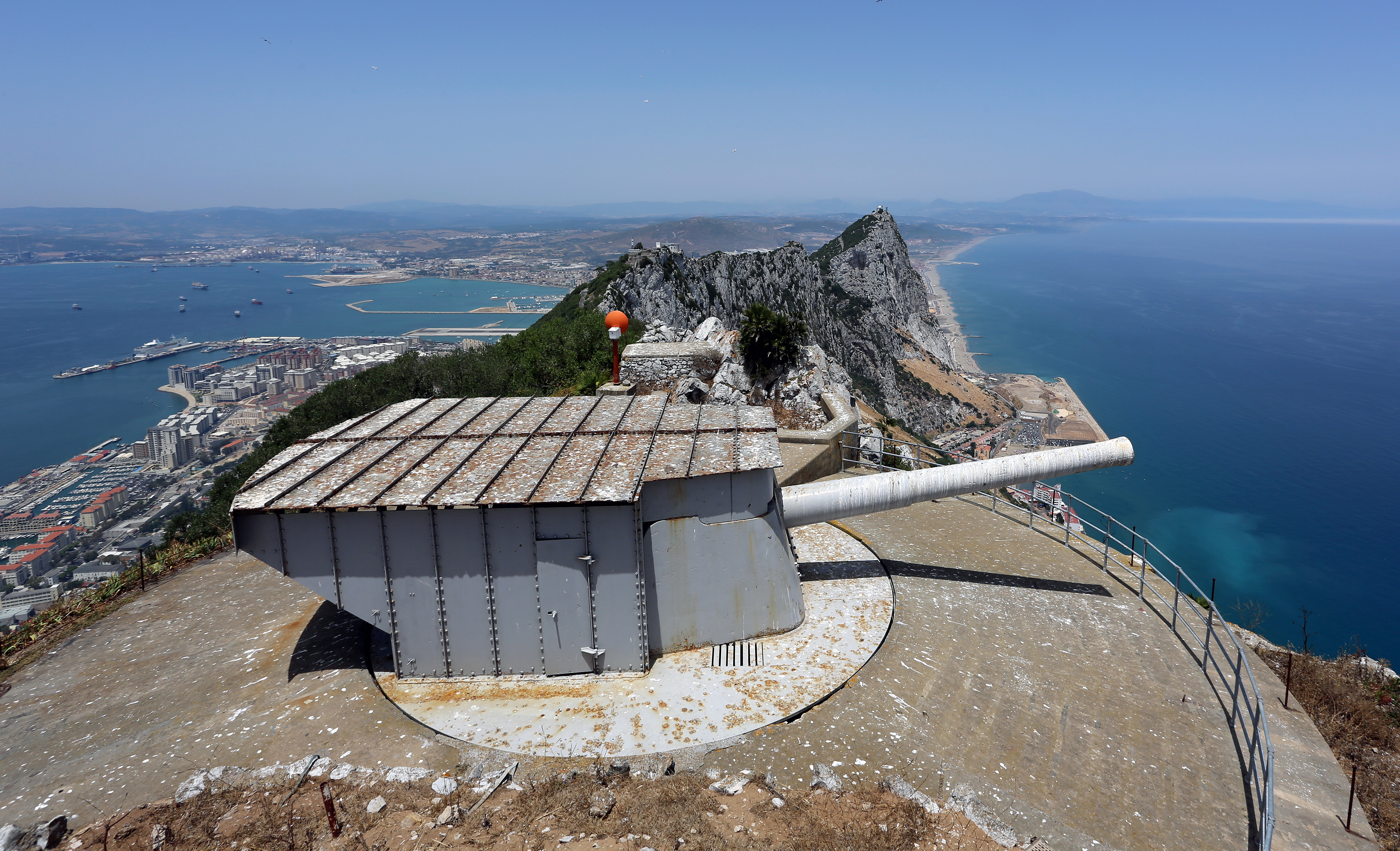
- Breakneck Battery's 9.2-inch Mark X coastal gun in 2013

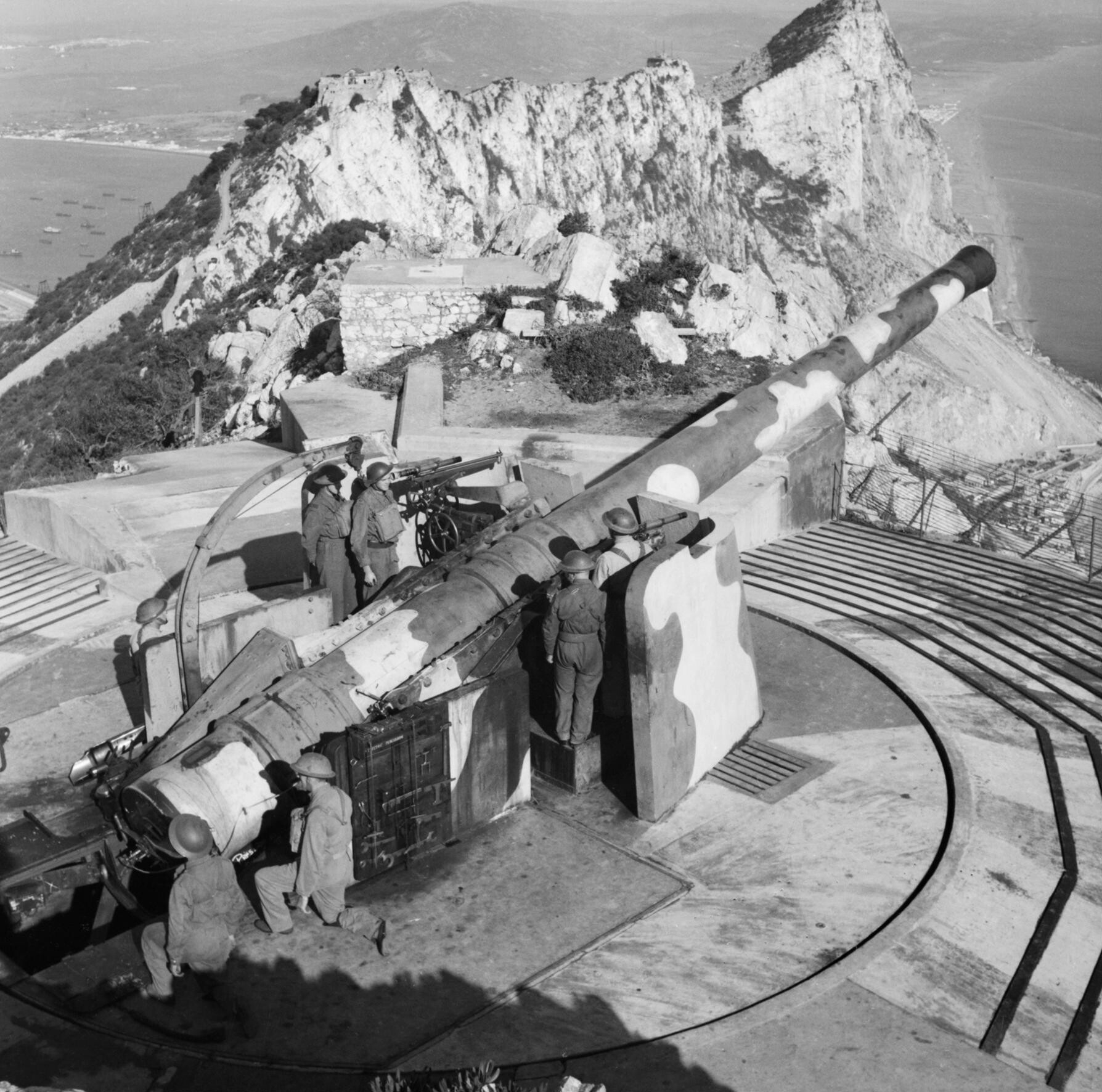
- Breakneck Battery, with a 9.2-inch Mark X coastal gun on a Mark V mounting, 4 January 1942

Site information
- Type: Artillery battery
- Owner: Ministry of Defence
- Open to the public: no

Location
- Location of Breakneck Battery in Gibraltar
- Location within Gibraltar
- Coordinates: 36.128373°N 5.344253°W

Site history
- Built: Between 1890 and 1914

Breakneck Battery is an artillery battery in the British Overseas Territory of Gibraltar. It is located on Ministry of Defence property at the Upper Rock Nature Reserve, north of Lord Airey's Battery. It is one of a dozen batteries in Gibraltar that had 9.2-inch (233.7 mm) guns installed around the turn of the twentieth century. The emplacement features a 9.2-inch Mark X breech-loading gun on a Mark V mounting. The battery was refurbished by 10 Signal Regiment in 2012 and 2016 whilst being on Ceremonial duties whilst the Gibraltar Regiment where on exercise and is one of three surviving 9.2-inch gun emplacements at the Upper Ridge of the Rock of Gibraltar. By the late twentieth century, the 9.2-inch guns in Gibraltar, Bermuda (also known affectionately as "the Rock", and the former site of a Royal Naval Dockyard, and once considered "the Gibraltar of the West"), Portugal, South Africa, and Australia were the remaining examples of an emplacement that at one point had been mounted at strategic locations across the British Empire.

== Early history ==
Breakneck Battery is in Gibraltar, the British Overseas Territory at the southern end of the Iberian Peninsula. The artillery battery is located at the Upper Ridge of the Upper Rock Nature Reserve, on Ministry of Defence property. It is positioned north of Lord Airey's Battery on a site once known as Mount Misery, which was renamed in 1901. The name "Breakneck" was inspired by the nearby Breakneck Stairs which descend part way down the sheer cliff on which the battery stands, overlooking the Mediterranean Sea.

The decision to mount 9.2-inch breech-loading guns on the emplacements in Gibraltar can be traced back to the explosion of one of the 38-ton, muzzle-loading guns on HMS Thunderer (1872). After that explosion on 2 January 1879, a Committee on Ordnance was founded to analyze the United Kingdom's artillery and the direction that it would take. The committee was directed to address "the question of breech-loading guns and such other questions as may be brought before it."

Following research and deliberations, the committee settled on rifled breech-loading guns, an improvement over the customary rifled muzzle-loading weapons. Although the 9.2-inch breech-loading weapon was initially employed as a naval gun, it eventually was used for coastal defence as well. It was effective in dealing with hostile warships and their associated long-range attacks. The 9.2-inch gun retained its importance in British coastal defence for more than half a century.

The mounting of 9.2-inch guns on Gibraltar's batteries commenced in the 1890s. By 1914, Gibraltar boasted a total of fourteen of the 9.2-inch weapons on twelve batteries. Breakneck Battery had a 9.2 inch Mark X breech-loading gun installed on a Mark V mounting. The World War II photograph obtained of the battery (pictured at right) by Lieutenant G W Dallison in 1942 is now part of the War Office Second World War Official Collection of photographs.

A shell store and bombproof shelter for the crew are located beneath the gun position, excavated from the solid rock. The gun itself originally had a steel shield in front of it to protect the crew from counter-battery fire but during the Second World War this was extended to form a steel enclosure open at the back, to provide some protection from shrapnel and bomb splinters.

== Recent history ==
Gibraltar's surviving 9.2-inch guns were described in a 1981 issue of After The Battle magazine:

... the crowning glory of the defenses of the Rock are the 9.2-inch guns. Five batteries still remain on the Rock: Levant, Spur, Breakneck, O'Hara's and Lord Airey's Batteries. Of these, only Levant Battery can easily be visited, the others being situated on military property behind locked gates. All of them are single-gun batteries each with a 9.2-inch gun, a type of weapon that was once one of the most important weapons in the British coastal artillery armoury.

Breakneck Battery is one of three surviving 9.2-inch gun emplacements at the Upper Ridge of the Rock, the others being O'Hara's Battery and Lord Airey's Battery. Of the three Upper Ridge emplacements, O'Hara's Battery is in the best condition. Breakneck was the first of the batteries to be decommissioned, in 1953.

The two other batteries mentioned, Levant Battery and Spur Battery, both had their guns removed in the late twentieth century. The former was decommissioned in the 1970s and had its gun removed; the barrel now rests in a scrap yard. Other than three Mk. X variants still surviving in the "Gibraltar of the West", Bermuda (two at St. David's Battery; one at Fort Victoria), by 1981, the year that the gun at the latter emplacement, Spur Battery, was dismantled for transfer to England in Project Vitello, Gibraltar's 9.2-inch guns represented three of the 25 remaining examples of a weapon that had at one time been mounted at strategic locations across the British Empire and its allies. For years, the Upper Ridge batteries were an excluded area in Gibraltar, where entry by the public was considered a criminal offence. While Breakneck Battery is still closed to the public, O'Hara's Battery and Lord Airey's Battery were opened in May 2010.

Members of the 4th Battalion, The Royal Regiment of Scotland (4 SCOTS), also known as The Highlanders, arrived in Gibraltar in early April 2012 to cover the responsibilities of the Royal Gibraltar Regiment, which was in the United Kingdom. In addition to training and guard duties, the soldiers participated in community projects, including refurbishing of the coastal artillery gun at Breakneck Battery. Upon the return of the Royal Gibraltar Regiment, the Highlanders left for their base in Sennelager, Germany.
