= Mediterranean Steps =

Hiking path in Gibraltar

Coordinates: 36.125034°N 5.343172°W

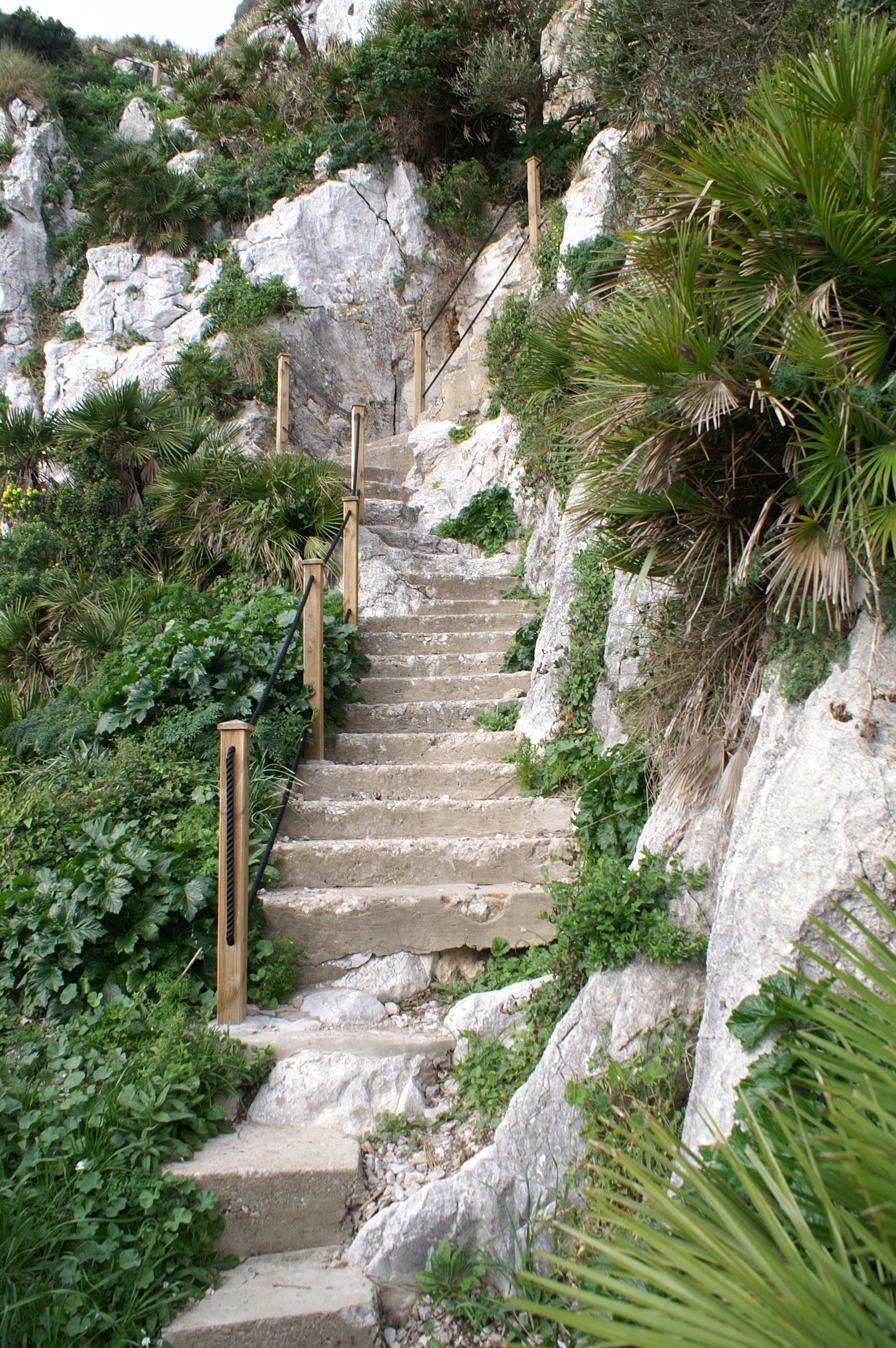
- The steps were refurbished and made safe in 2007
- Location: Upper Rock Nature Reserve, Gibraltar
- Designation: Nature Trail
- Highest point: Lord Airey's Battery, 400 m (1,300 ft)
- Season: All year - £16.00 entry
- Sights: Levant Battery, Martin's Cave, Goat's Hair Twin Caves, Lord Airey's Battery, Strait of Gibraltar
- Hazards: lack of water, vertigo, worn path

Trail map
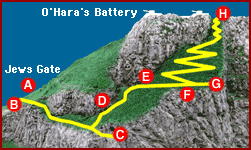
- A.Jews Gate B.Levant Battery C.Martin's Cave D.Goat's Hair Twin Caves E.Tunnel and Pumping Station F.WW2 Observation Posts G.View point H.Lord Airey's Battery Top of Steps

Mediterranean Steps is a path and nature trail in the British Overseas Territory of Gibraltar. One of the footpaths of Gibraltar, the path is located entirely within the Upper Rock Nature Reserve and was built by the British military but is now used by civilians as a pedestrian route linking Martin's Path to Lord Airey's Battery near the summit of Rock of Gibraltar. The path offers views over the Strait of Gibraltar, Windmill Hill, Europa Point, the Great Sand Dune, Gibraltar's east side beaches, the Mediterranean Sea and the Spanish Costa del Sol.

== History ==
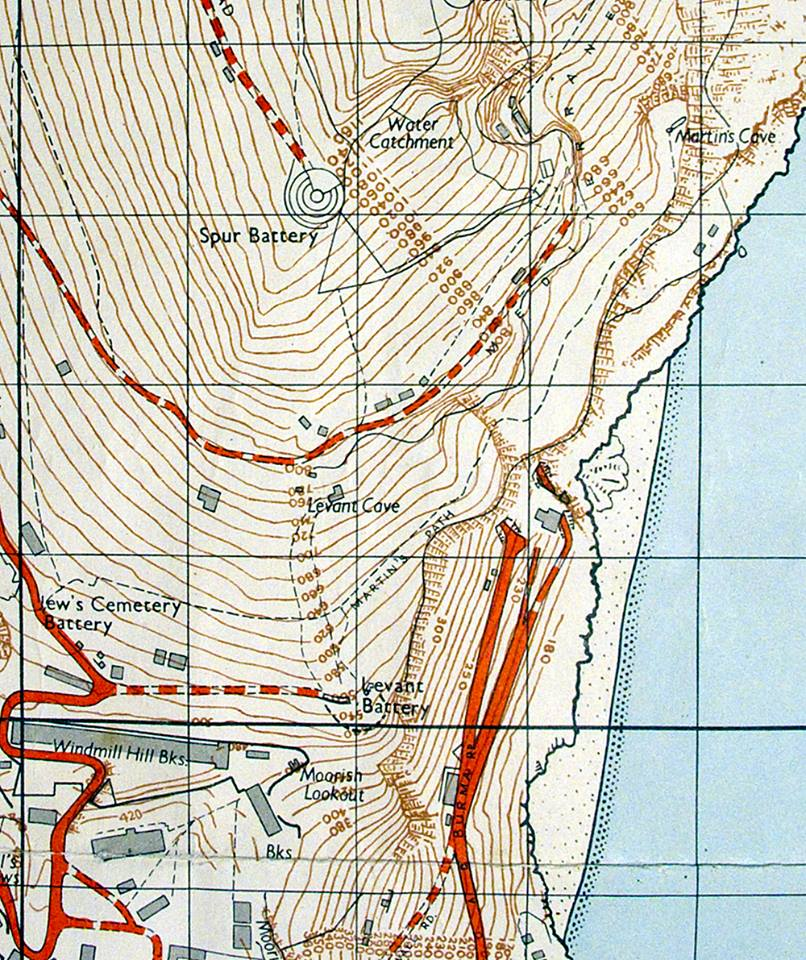
South east section of a 1961 military map of Gibraltar showing where Martin's Path joins Mediterranean Steps

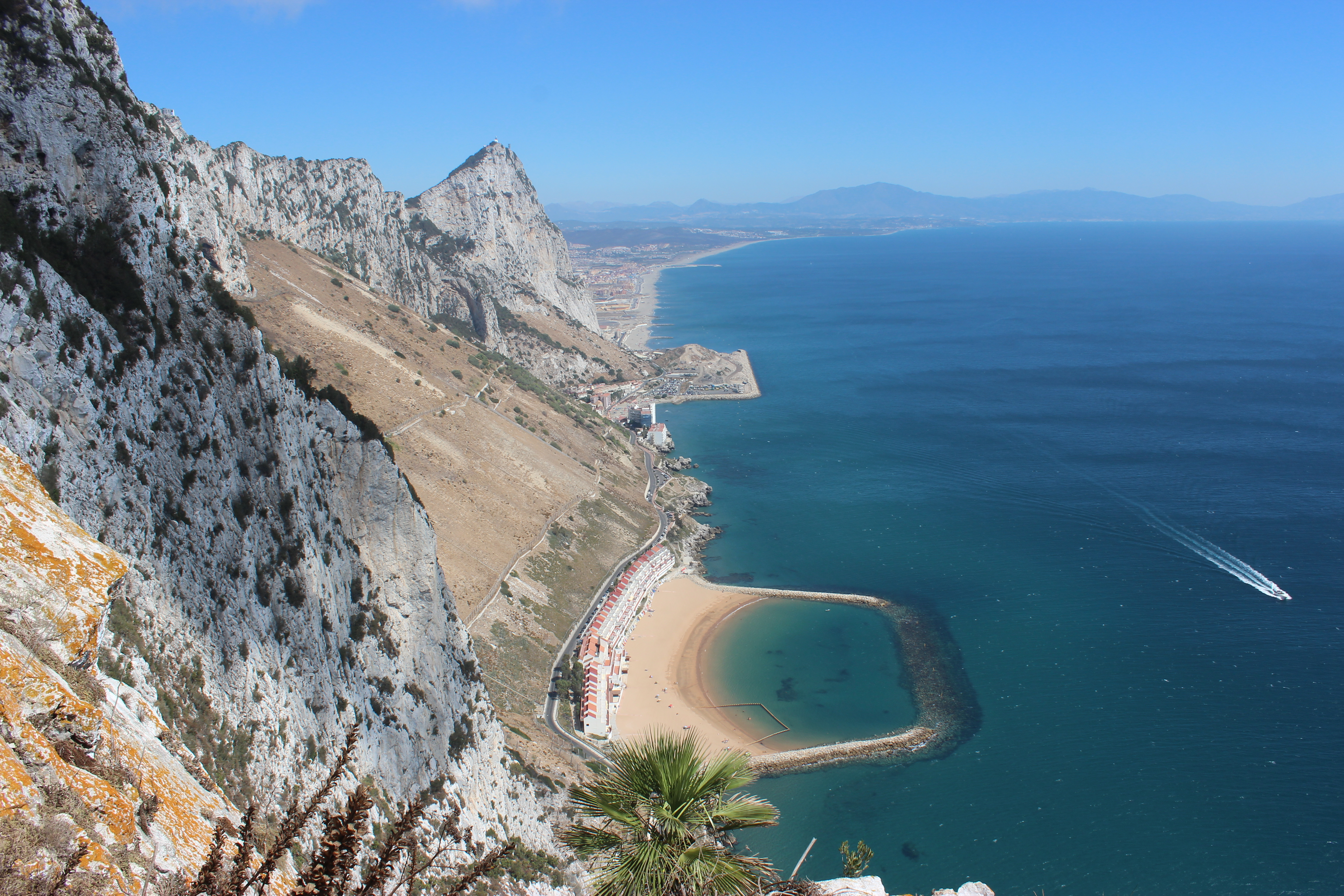
View of the Rock of Gibraltar from the Mediterranean Steps

The Mediterranean Steps were built as part of the military communications system built by the British to allow access to their various defence posts at the southern end of the Rock. At the highest point of the steps are the two 9.2 inch guns of Lord Airey's Battery and O'Hara's Battery. Other gun emplacements and ancillary buildings dating back to World War II are evident along the route.

The steps were restored in 2007 by the Bonita Trust, the Government of Gibraltar and the Gibraltar Ornithological and Natural History Society.

== Route ==
The steps zig-zag up the Rock from the end of Martin's Path to near the summit. Martin's Path starts on the south western slopes of the Rock gently above the derelict Levant Battery near Jews' Gate Cemetery and proceeds to its first bend as the path turns to the east side of the Rock where it joins Mediterranean Steps. Martin's Path actually continues onwards to Martin's Cave but the way is prohibited and a locked gate protects the cave.

The route is entirely within the Upper Rock Nature Reserve and the Goat's Hair Twin Caves can be seen on the way. These caves show evidence of when they were sea caves and the level of the sea was dramatically higher. These are amongst a number of caves in Gibraltar which have given evidence of prehistoric human habitation.

The path leads up to a derelict pre-war tunnel and pumping station, once an operational old fresh water pumping station which collected rain water via the geologically modified slopes above. These slopes extend towards the top of the Rock (O'Hara's battery). The trail continues on a short path to a viewing platform and continues up the Rock to the twin batteries on the Rock's upper ridge. The path emerges at what was the location of O'Hara's Tower (O'Hara's Folly) which was a watchtower built in an attempt to observe shipping in the port of Cádiz. It proved to be useless and lightning eventually created a ruin that was later destroyed in target practice.
