= Mount Misery Battery =

Artillery battery on the Rock of Gibraltar

Mount Misery Battery was an artillery battery situated on the Upper Ridge of the Rock of Gibraltar. It was situated at Mount Misery, one of the peaks of the Rock. In 1901 its name was changed to Breakneck Battery at the suggestion of Major-General Sir John Slade of the Royal Artillery. Slade was to go on command British troops in Egypt from 1903 to 1905. Following his suggestion in 1899 that it would be a suitable position to accommodate a long-range coastal defence gun, a 9.2-inch breech-loading Mark X gun on a Mark V mounting was installed in 1906.

== Bibliography ==
- Hughes, Quentin; Migos, Athanassios (1995). Strong as the Rock of Gibraltar. Gibraltar: Exchange Publications. OCLC 48491998.
