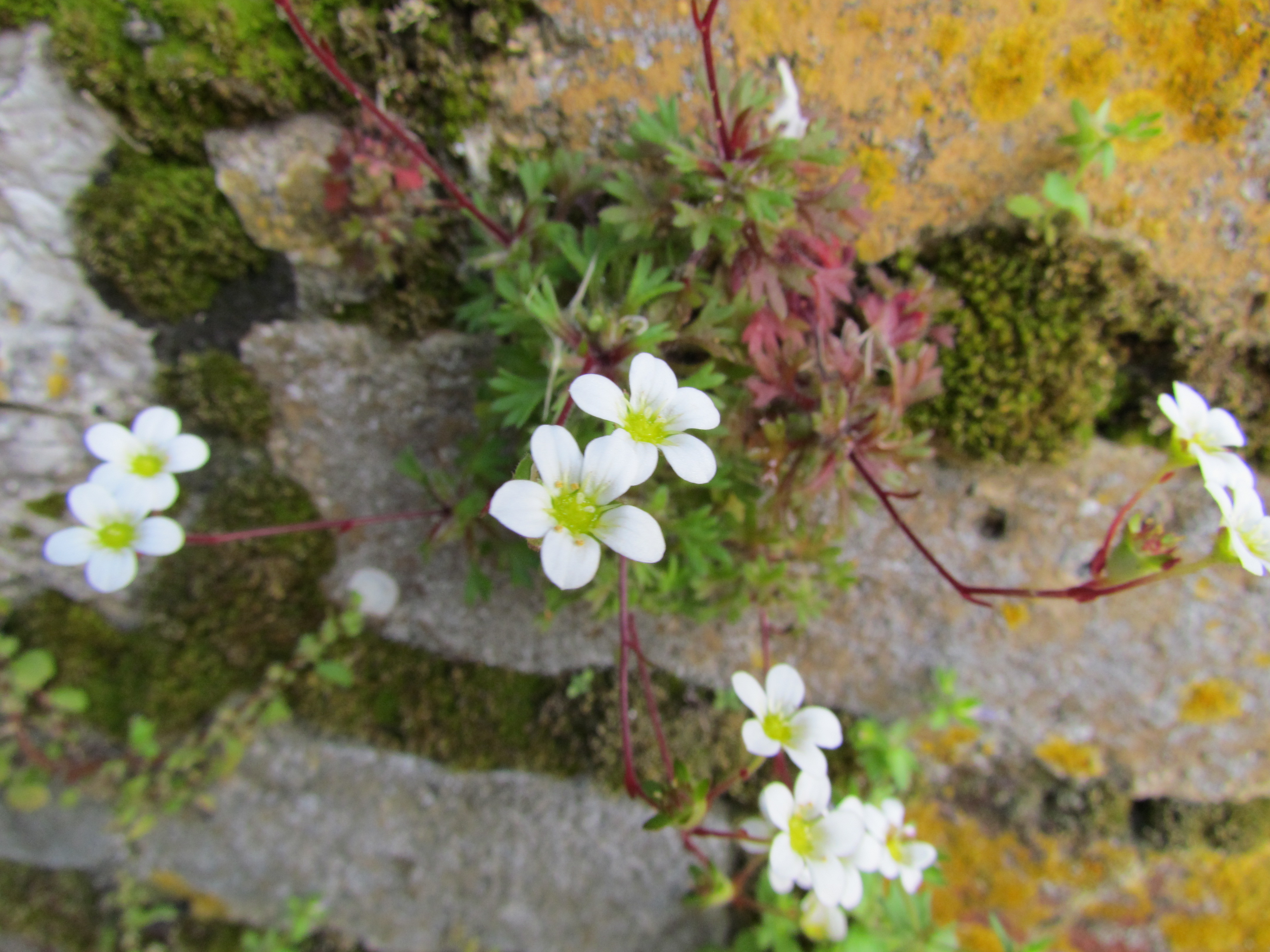

Scientific classification
- Kingdom: Plantae
- Clade: Tracheophytes
- Clade: Angiosperms
- Clade: Eudicots
- Order: Saxifragales
- Family: Saxifragaceae
- Genus: Saxifraga
- Species: S. globulifera

Binomial name
- Saxifraga globulifera Desf.

= Saxifraga globulifera =

Species of flowering plan, a saxifrage

Saxifraga globulifera is a flowering plant of the genus Saxifraga and the family Saxifragaceae.

== Habitat ==
The plant grows in southern Spain on limestone rocks and cliffs. The Gibraltar saxifrage, a variety, is an endemic plant in the Upper Rock Nature Reserve in Gibraltar. An 1838 survey of plants in the region said that the plants found in Spain did not differ in any respect from plants found in the Atlas mountains across the strait of Gibraltar. Sir William Jackson Hooker wrote of the plants he found in 1844 on the Sierra de Mijas, to the north of the road from Málaga to Gibraltar. He found Saxifraga globulifera in the clefts of rock on the south side of the mountain, as well as other plants that grow on Mount Atlas.

== Description ==
In 1827 the plant was described as follows:

Stem bulbiferous; leaves nerved, the lower ones spatulate, quite entire, the upper ones palmate three of five-cleft, in the flowering branch remote, linear.—This has the appearance of the preceding [Saxifraga hypnoides, mossy saxifrage], and is scarcely distinct from it.—Found on the top of Mount Atlas.

The leaves are glandular-hairy, 5 to 15 millimetres (0.20 to 0.59 in) long. They have semi-circular outlines with three or more lobes. Stems 7 to 12 centimetres (2.8 to 4.7 in) tall bear from three to seven small, white-petaled flowers.

== See also ==
- List of plants in the Gibraltar Botanic Gardens
