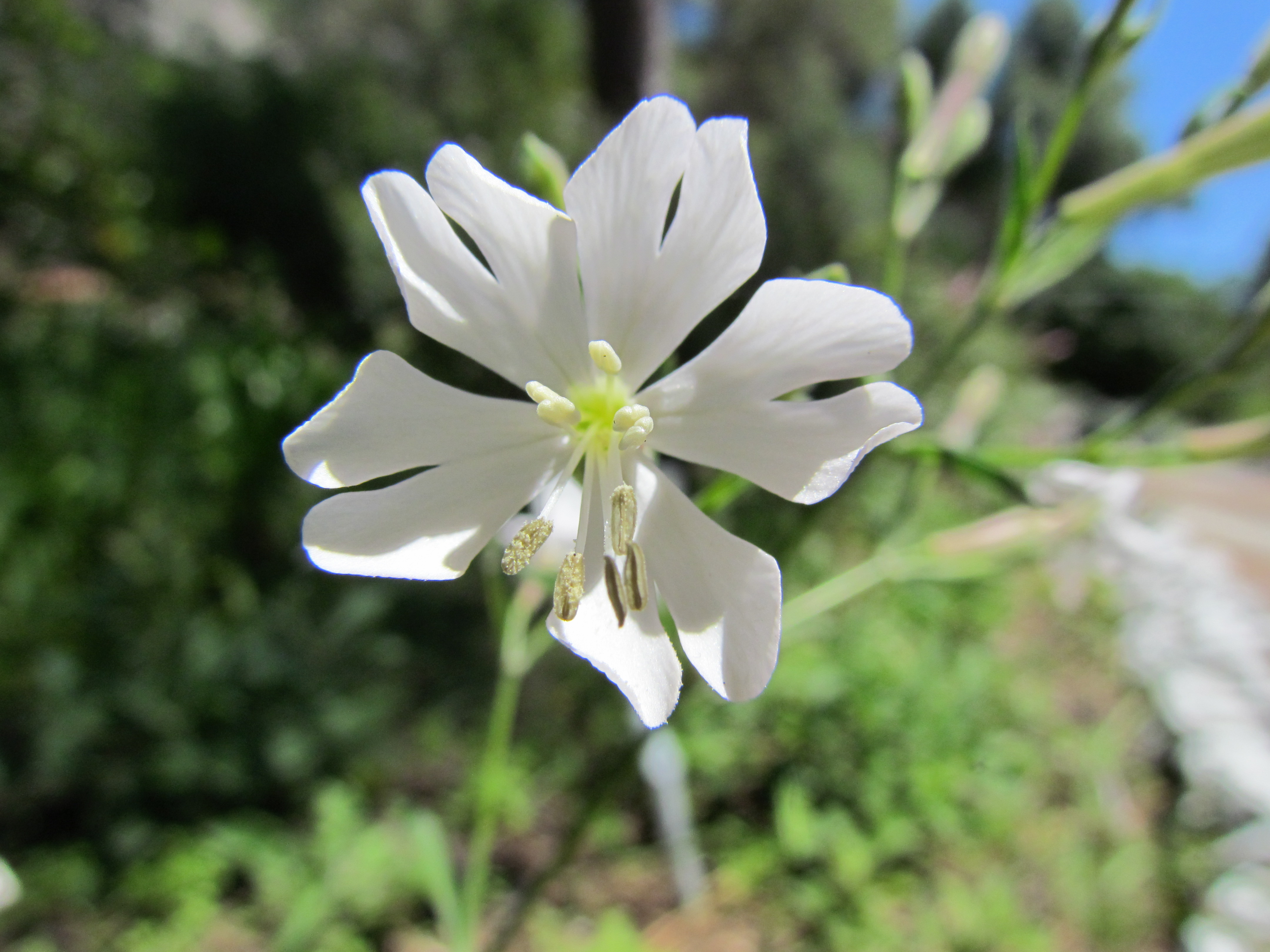
- Silene tomentosa flower at the Gibraltar Botanic Gardens

Scientific classification
- Kingdom: Plantae
- Clade: Tracheophytes
- Clade: Angiosperms
- Clade: Eudicots
- Order: Caryophyllales
- Family: Caryophyllaceae
- Genus: Silene
- Species: S. tomentosa

Binomial name
- Silene tomentosa Otth

= Silene tomentosa =

Species of flowering plant

Silene tomentosa, the Gibraltar campion, is a very rare flowering plant of the genus Silene and the family Caryophyllaceae. It is a woody-based perennial about 40 cm high, with bilobed flowers ranging from pink to pale violet and is endemic to Gibraltar.

== Re-discovery and conservation ==
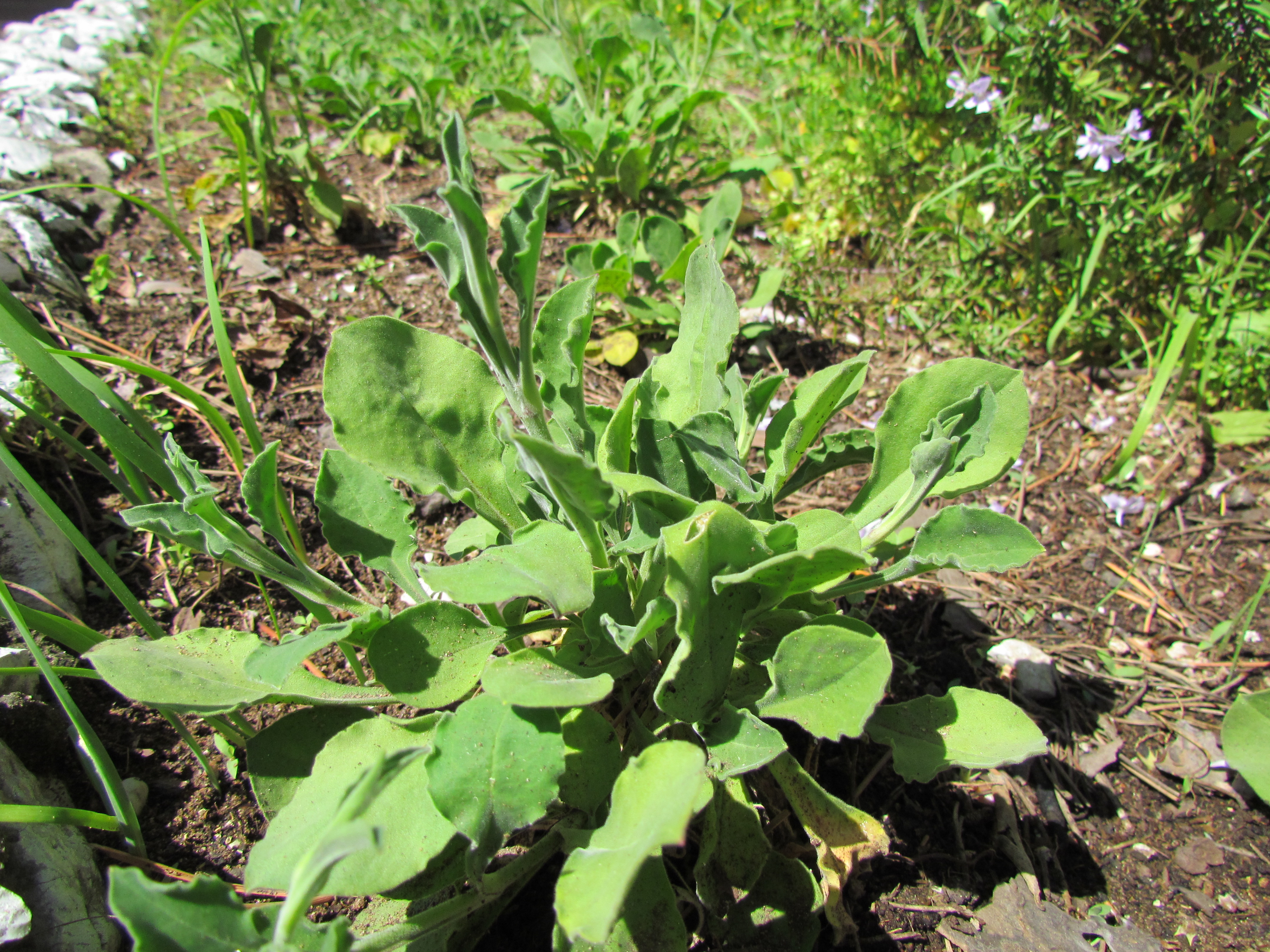
S. tomentosa plant at the Gibraltar Botanic Gardens.

Although the scientific community outside Gibraltar already thought Silene tomentosa to be extinct, the Gibraltar Ornithological & Natural History Society's botanical section knew it was still around in 1985, but by 1992 they also considered it to be extinct.

It was later re-discovered in 1994, when it was found growing in the Upper Rock Nature Reserve. Following this re-discovery, it was propagated at the Millennium Seed Bank and the type specimen is kept at the Royal Botanic Gardens, Kew in London. Using knowledge gained from this process, other plants have been successfully reintroduced into the Upper Rock Nature Reserve on the Rock of Gibraltar.

Silene tomentosa is protected by the law of Gibraltar under the Nature Protection Act, 1991.

== Habitat ==
Silene tomentosa is currently found growing wild only on the rocky outcrops of the Rock of Gibraltar. Specimens are also grown at Gibraltar Botanic Gardens.

== See also ==
- List of plants in the Gibraltar Botanic Gardens
- Iberis gibraltarica
