= O'Hara's Tower =

Watchtower in Gibraltar

- O'Hara's Folly
- Part of Fortifications of Gibraltar
- Upper Rock Nature Reserve, Gibraltar
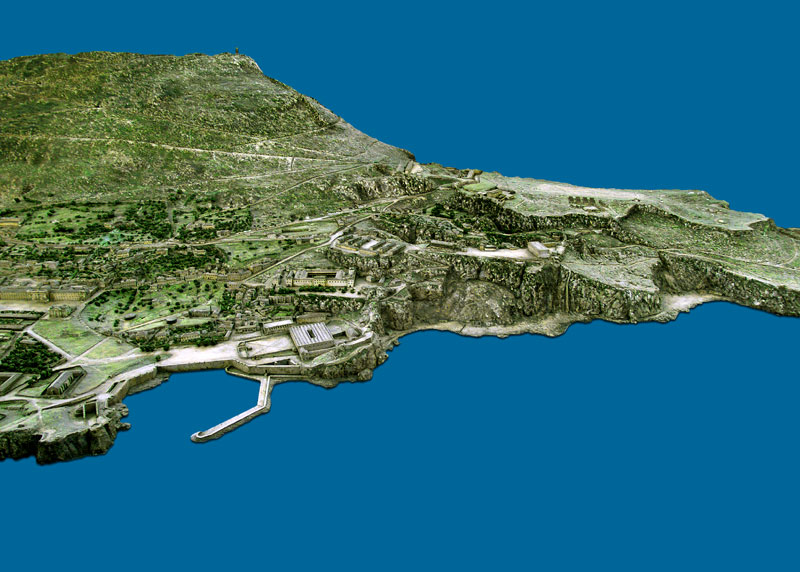
- 1865 Model of Gibraltar depicting O'Hara's Tower at top left.

Site information
- Type: Watchtower

Location
- Former location of O'Hara's Tower within Gibraltar
- Coordinates: 36.123845°N 5.342880°W

Site history
- Built: 1787–1791
- Materials: Stone, Iron
- Demolished: 1888

O'Hara's Tower was a watchtower in the British Overseas Territory of Gibraltar. It was located at the highest point of the Rock of Gibraltar, at what is now O'Hara's Battery, near the southern end of the Upper Rock Nature Reserve.

Initially known as St. George's Tower, it was constructed in the late 18th century on the order of then Lieutenant Governor Charles O'Hara, under the presumption that it would be useful in observing the enemy at the port of Cádiz.

Not only was it unsuccessful; it was struck by lightning shortly after it was built, and remained in ruins for much of the 19th century until its demolition in 1888. Formerly referred to as St. George's Tower, it came to be known as O'Hara's Tower or, frequently, O'Hara's Folly.

== History ==
O'Hara's Tower was in Gibraltar, the British Overseas Territory at the southern end of the Iberian Peninsula. The watchtower was located at the summit of the Rock of Gibraltar near what is now O'Hara's Battery in the southern end of the Upper Rock Nature Reserve, at an altitude of 426 metres (1,398 ft). It was positioned at the southern terminus of the current O'Hara's Road, known as O'Hara's Point.

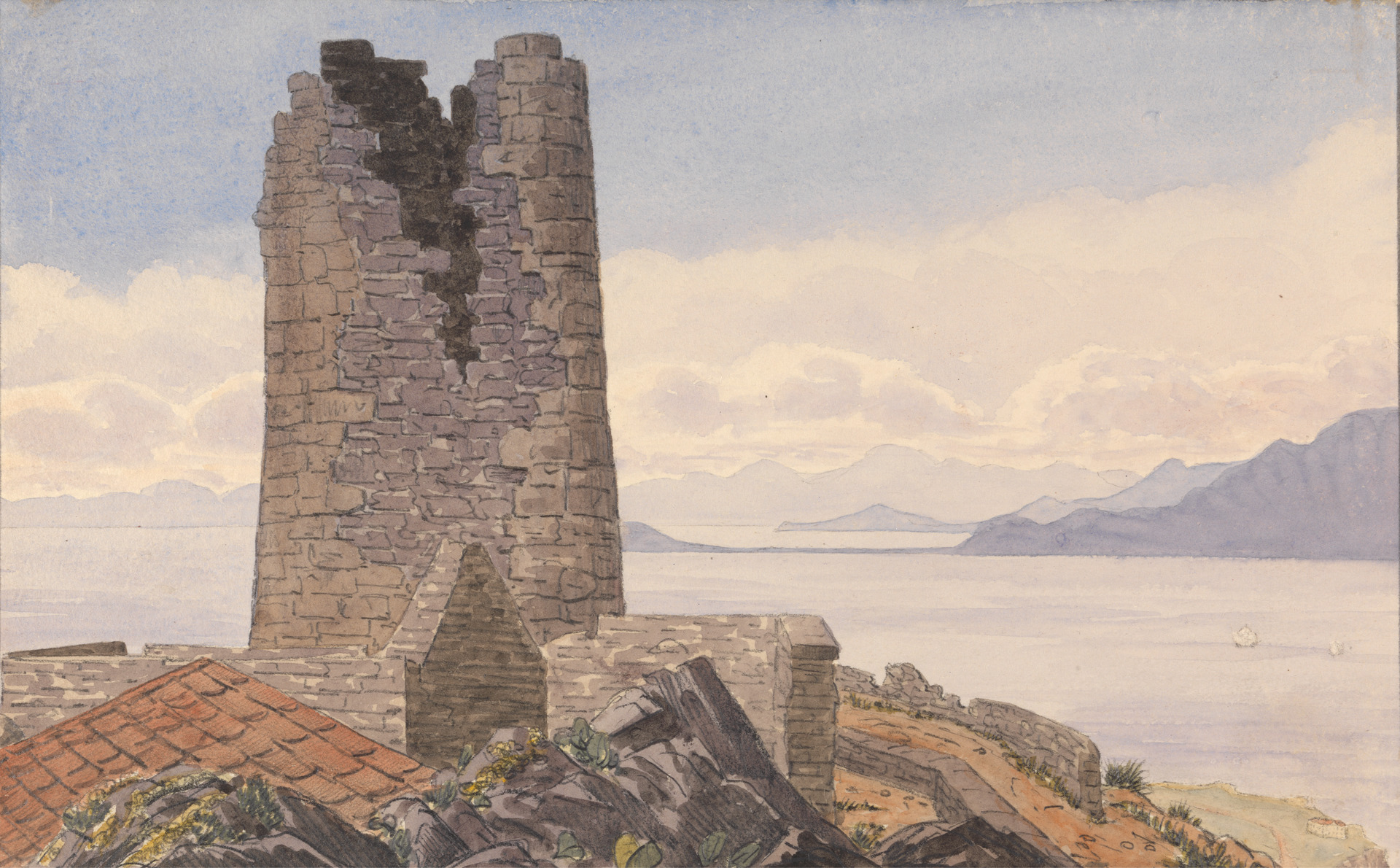
O'Hara's Tower, Gibraltar by George Lothian Hall

The tower had first been proposed by General Charles O'Hara, then Lieutenant Governor, who served as Governor of Gibraltar from 1795 to 1802. He was notorious for having surrendered to both George Washington and Napoleon Bonaparte, at Yorktown (1781) and Toulon (1793), respectively. O'Hara had been of the opinion that a tower at The Rock's summit would enable the garrison to observe the activity of the Spanish fleet at the Port of Cadiz, about 60 miles (97 km) away. He was alone in this belief; despite this, with persistence, he succeeded in having the tower built. It was constructed of hewn stone and iron between 1787 and 1791.

However, others' concerns were justified, as it turned out that Cadiz was not visible from the tower due to the elevation of intervening mountains. Not long after the tower's construction, it was hit by lightning during a violent storm and severely damaged. One of the tower's sentinels died in the lightning strike. By 1811 the tower had garnered the nickname of "O'Hara's Folly", bestowed by the garrison. O'Hara's Tower was in ruins through much of the remainder of the 19th century.

== Demolition ==
O'Hara's Tower had been scheduled for demolition in 1888. The details of its demolition vary slightly. In one account, the tower came down that year as a result of target practice by the crew of HMS Wasp. In another, there was a wager between the gunners of the garrison and the officers of HMS Wasp. The men of HMS Wasp adjusted their guns such that they were able to target at a high elevation, and brought down the tower with their sixth shot. However this is unlikely due to the fact HMS Wasp (1880) foundered in 1884 and HMS Wasp (1886) was lost with all hands in 1887. Following demolition of the tower, O'Hara's Battery was constructed on the same site, with the first 6-inch breech-loading gun installed on a Vavasseur mounting in 1890.

== Gallery ==
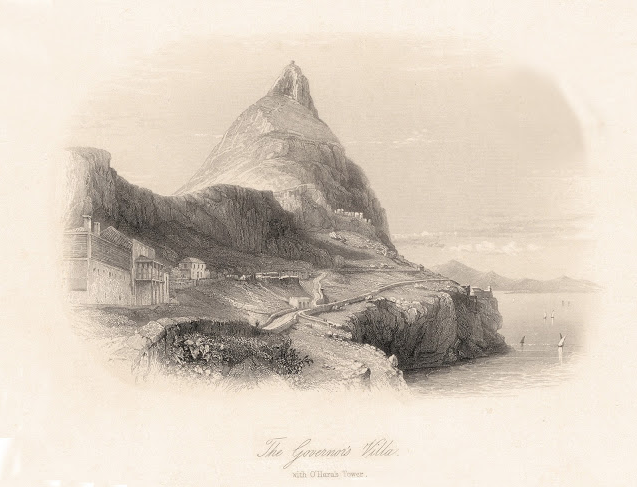
The Governor's Villa, now known as Governor's Cottage. O'Hara's Tower.

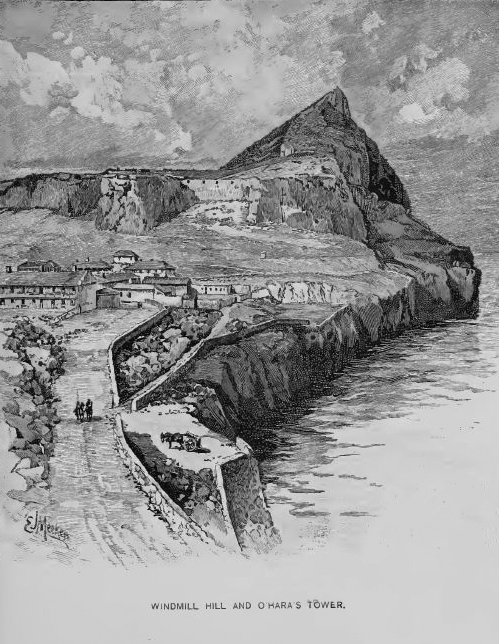
Windmill Hill and O'Hara's Tower at the south end of Gibraltar.

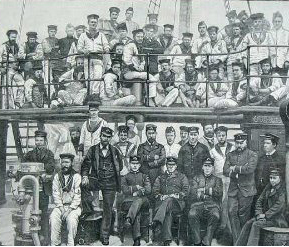
The crew of HMS Wasp that brought down O'Hara's Tower in 1888.
