= O'Hara's Battery =

Artillery battery in Gibraltar

- Part of Fortifications of Gibraltar
- Upper Rock Nature Reserve, Gibraltar
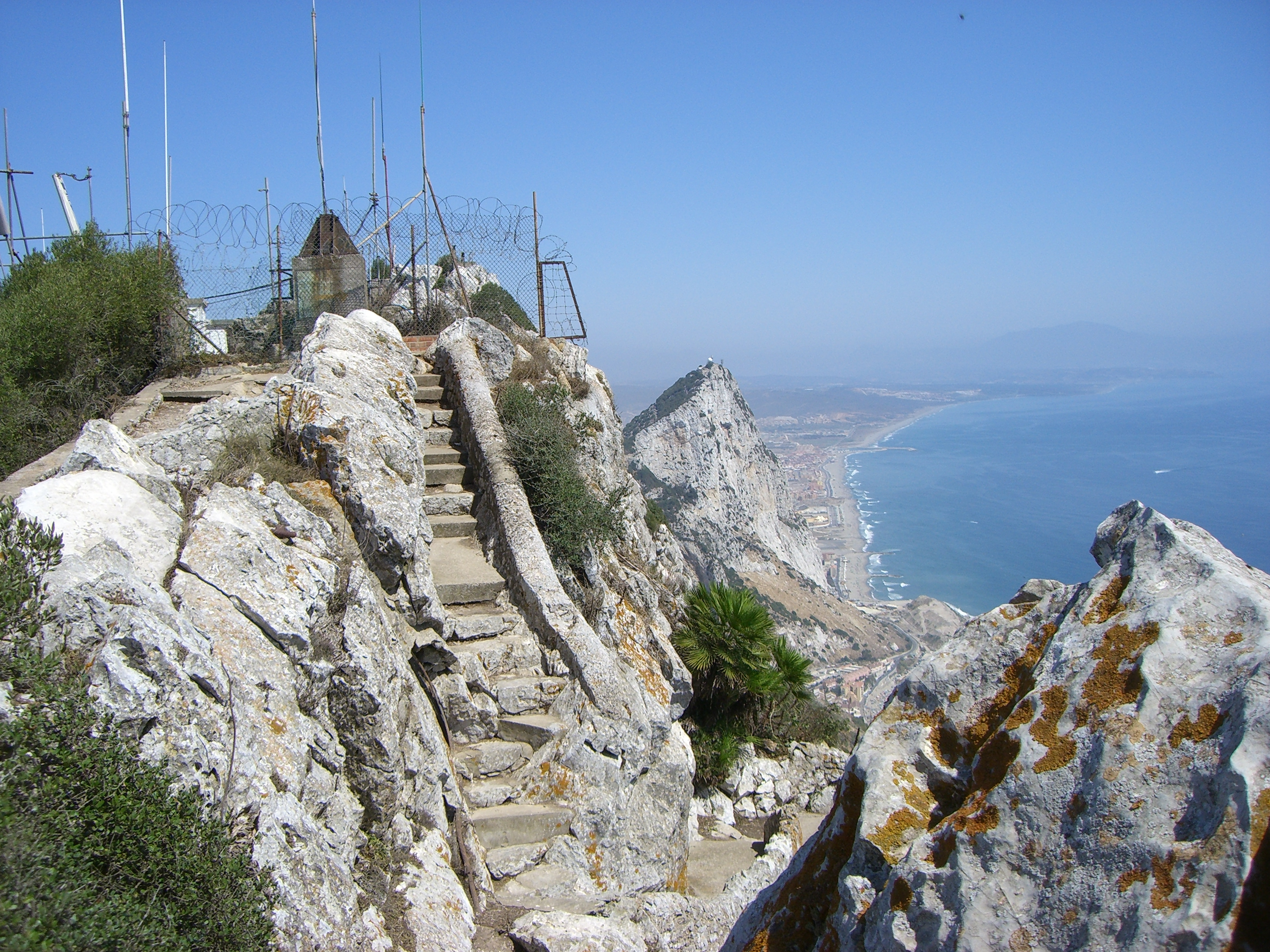
- Mediterranean Steps lead to the two batteries - O'Hara's in view

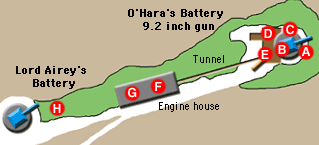
- Map of O'Hara's Battery (A-E), Engine Room (F), Equipment Exhibit (G), and Lord Airey's Battery (H). North is to the left.

Site information
- Type: Artillery battery
- Owner: Government of Gibraltar
- Open to the public: Yes
- Condition: Good

Location
- The Mediterranean Steps lead to O'Hara's Battery in Gibraltar
- Coordinates: 36.123845°N 5.342880°W

Site history
- Built: 1890

O'Hara's Battery is an artillery battery in the British Overseas Territory of Gibraltar. It is located at the highest point of the Rock of Gibraltar, near the southern end of the Upper Rock Nature Reserve, in close proximity to Lord Airey's Battery. It was constructed in 1890 at the former site of a watchtower that had earned the name O'Hara's Folly. The battery and tower were both named after the Governor of Gibraltar, Charles O'Hara. The first gun mounted on the battery was a 6-inch breech loading gun, which was replaced with a 9.2 inch Mark X BL gun in 1901. The battery was in use during World War II and was last fired during training exercises in 1976. O'Hara's Battery has been refurbished and is open to the public. The battery and its associated works are listed with the Gibraltar Heritage Trust.

== Early history ==
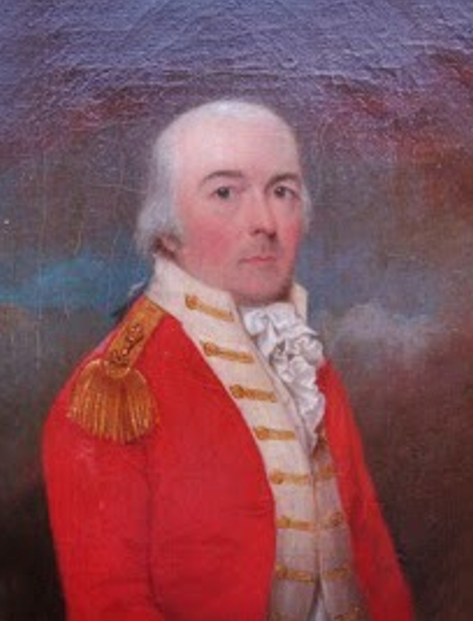
Charles O'Hara (1740–1802)

O'Hara's Battery is in Gibraltar, the British Overseas Territory at the southern end of the Iberian Peninsula. The artillery battery is located near the southern end of the Upper Rock Nature Reserve, near Lord Airey's Battery, at the highest point of the Rock of Gibraltar, 426 metres (1,398 ft). The emplacement is in the Upper Battery area, which also includes Lord Airey's Battery and Spur Battery, although the gun of the latter was removed in Project Vitello. It is positioned at the southern terminus of O'Hara's Road, known as O'Hara's Point. The battery and road were named after the Governor of Gibraltar General Charles O'Hara (1740–1802). He served as governor from 1795 until his death in February 1802. O'Hara was replaced as governor later that year by Prince Edward, the Duke of Kent, and future father of Queen Victoria.

O'Hara had believed that if he were successful in constructing a watchtower on the highest point of the Rock, the Garrison would be able to observe the enemy at the Spanish port of Cádiz. While O'Hara's Tower was eventually built, it was not successful in its intended purpose and was nicknamed O'Hara's Folly. In 1888, the tower was scheduled for demolition. A bet ensued between the gunners of the Garrison and the officers of HMS Wasp. Ultimately, it was the men of the Wasp who brought down the tower with their sixth shot. O'Hara's Folly was not the only nickname associated with the governor. O'Hara himself was frequently referred to as the Old Cock of the Rock. The handsome, flamboyant officer who wore the garb of an earlier era has been described as "the most perfect specimen I ever saw of the soldier and courtier of the last age." He was popular with the Garrison and lavished hospitality on even the humblest of guests. Although never married, O'Hara had at least two mistresses, and fathered four illegitimate children.

After the demolition of the tower, construction of O'Hara's Battery was completed by 1890, with the first 6-inch BL gun on a Vavasseur mounting installed that year on the battery. In 1901, it was replaced by a 9.2 inch Mark X BL gun with a range of 29,000 yards (16 mi), to defend the Strait of Gibraltar. The range meant that, in theory, it was capable of reaching the African shore, only 14 miles away. The gun was exposed to the elements for more than three decades. In 1934, a steel shield was installed which afforded protection from small arms fire and splinters. The battery continued in active use during World War II.

O'Hara's Battery features a narrow stairway (pictured below) which leads to the door of an underground magazine. A concrete enclosure contains a portion of the shell hoist and surrounds the gun turntable, which provides support to the 9.2 inch gun and rotates it as needed. Large black steel doors in the enclosure provide access to the turntable. A path (pictured below) which leads down from O'Hara's Battery turns up to the nearby Lord Airey's Battery. That pathway features an extra gun barrel (pictured below). The tunnel (pictured below) between the engine room and the gun not only provides access, but also stores pumps, hoists, and shells.

== Recent history ==
A 1947 film featuring the guns of Gibraltar

O'Hara's Battery is one of four television broadcasting sites in Gibraltar; the others are at Signal Hill; the North Mole, Gibraltar Harbour; and Tower Blocks. In May 2012, the Gibraltar Regulatory Authority finalized a contract with United Kingdom-based Arqiva to establish digital broadcasting on the Rock. The new transmitters will operate from one location on the Upper Rock, replacing two of the existing sites: O'Hara's Battery and Signal Hill. Having the infrastructure at a single site is also expected to reduce the environmental impact.

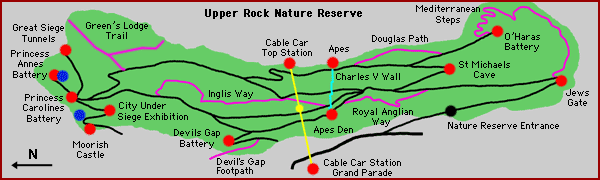
Map of the Upper Rock Nature Reserve. North is to the left.

The guns from O'Hara's Battery and Lord Airey's Battery were last fired on 7 April 1976 during a training exercise. More recently, the gun and infrastructure at the O'Hara's Battery site were refurbished. In 2009, visiting servicemen from regiments of the Territorial and Regular Armies spent weeks restoring O'Hara's and Lord Airey's Batteries. For years, O'Hara's Battery had been classified as an excluded site, where entry was a criminal offence. However, in May 2010, the Government of Gibraltar opened O'Hara's Battery to the public. The site is under the supervision of the Gibraltar Tourist Board, but managed on a day-to-day basis by a private company.

In September 2012, soldiers of the 10 Signal Regiment arrived in Gibraltar to temporarily replace the Royal Gibraltar Regiment that was training at Exercise Jebel Sahara. The 10 Signal Regiment worked at O'Hara's Battery, clearing the gun pit.

O'Hara's Battery is one of three surviving 9.2 inch gun emplacements at the upper ridge of the Rock, the others being Lord Airey's Battery and Breakneck Battery, the latter on Ministry of Defence property. O'Hara's Battery, including the 9.2 inch gun, magazine, engine room, and extra gun barrel, is listed with the Gibraltar Heritage Trust.

== Gallery ==
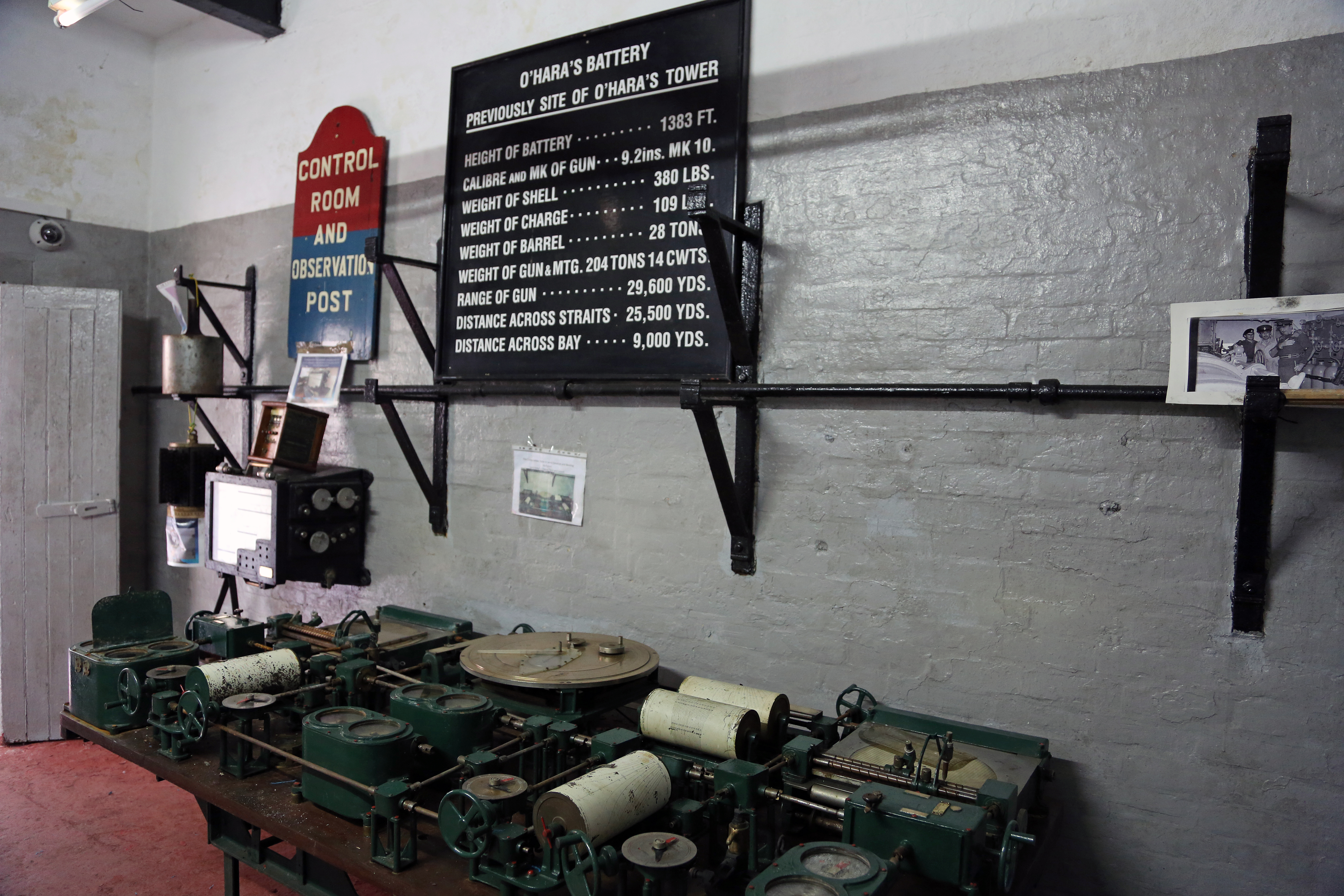
O'Hara's Control Room and Observation Post

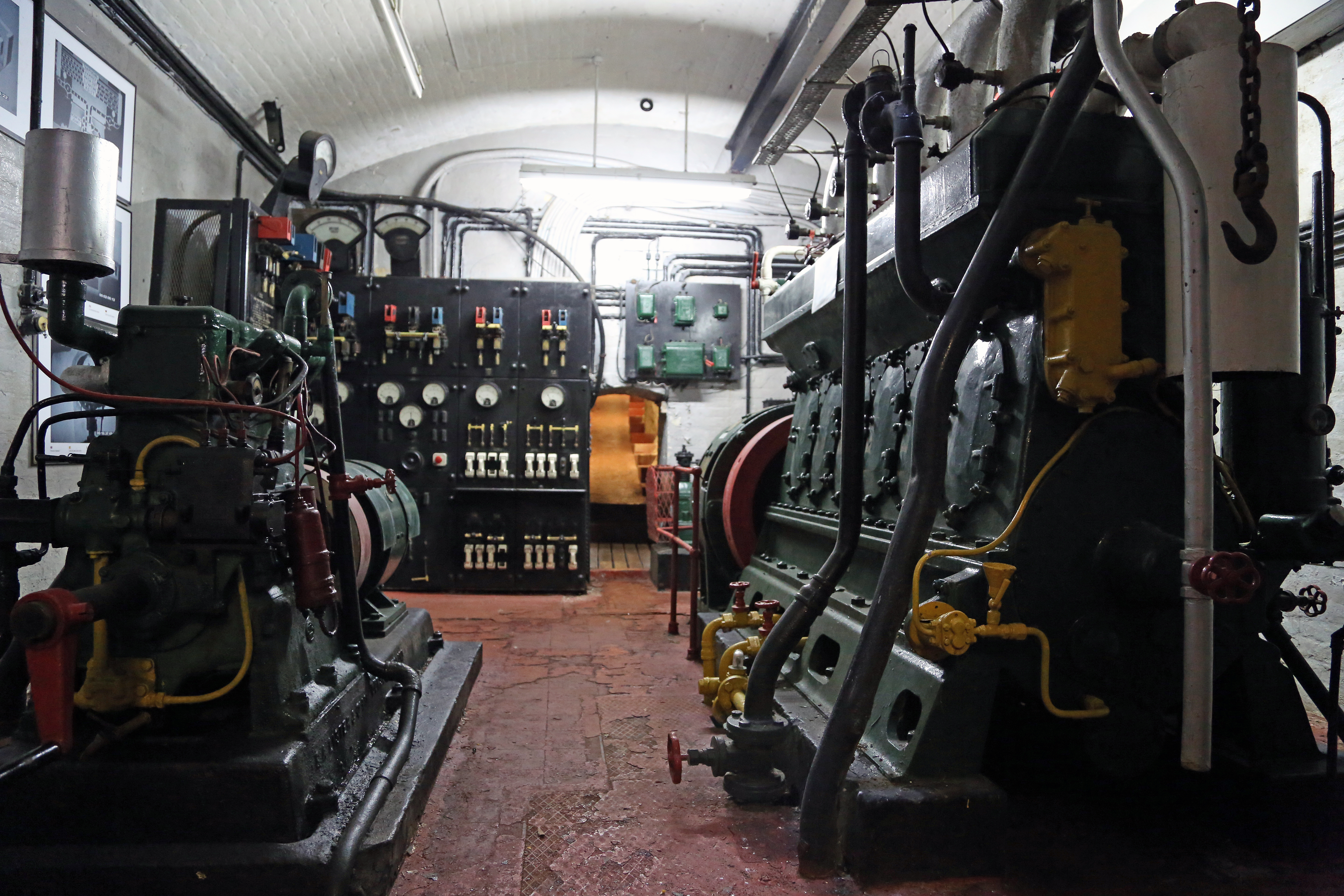
The Engine Room

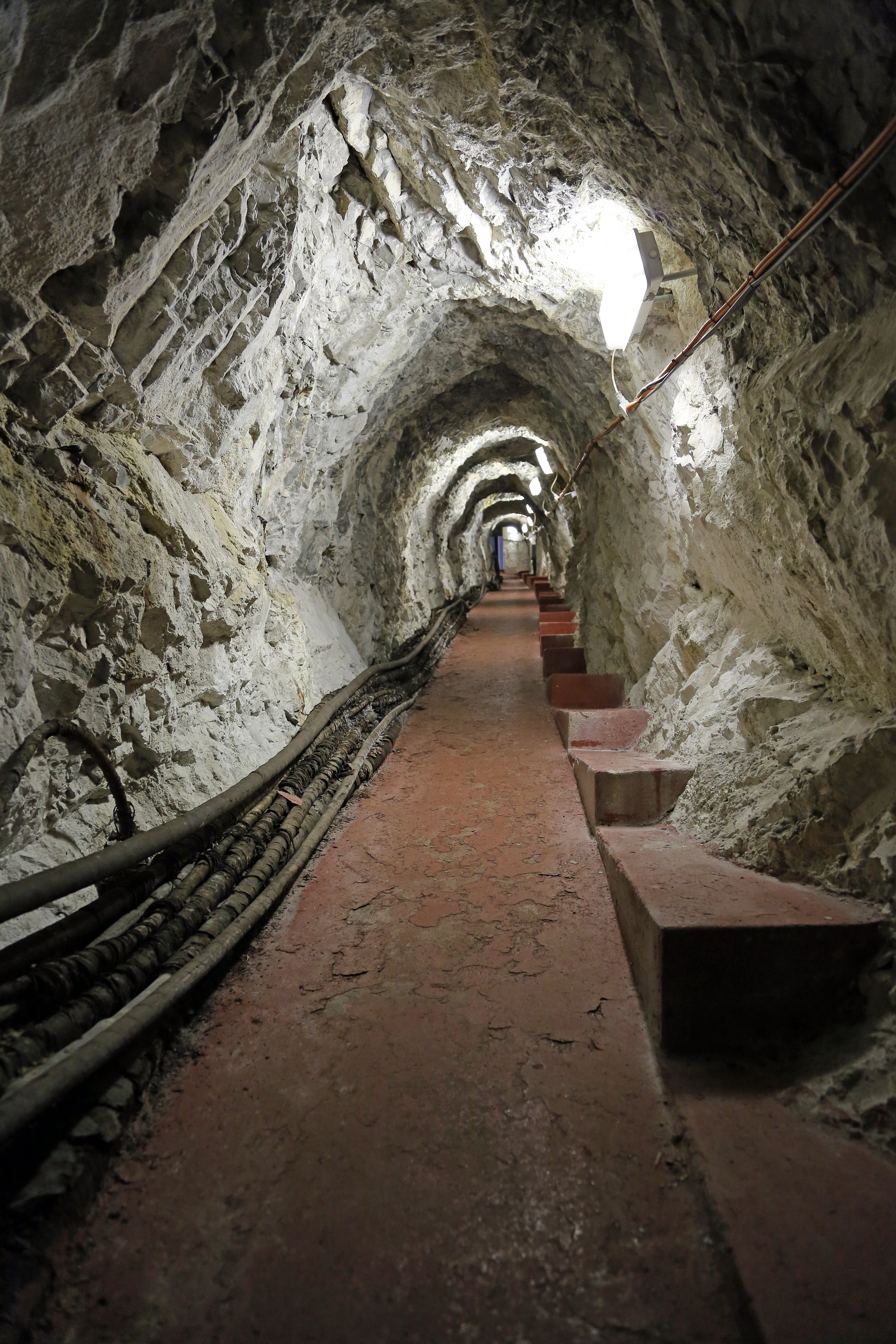
Tunnel from engine room to gun at
O'Hara's Battery

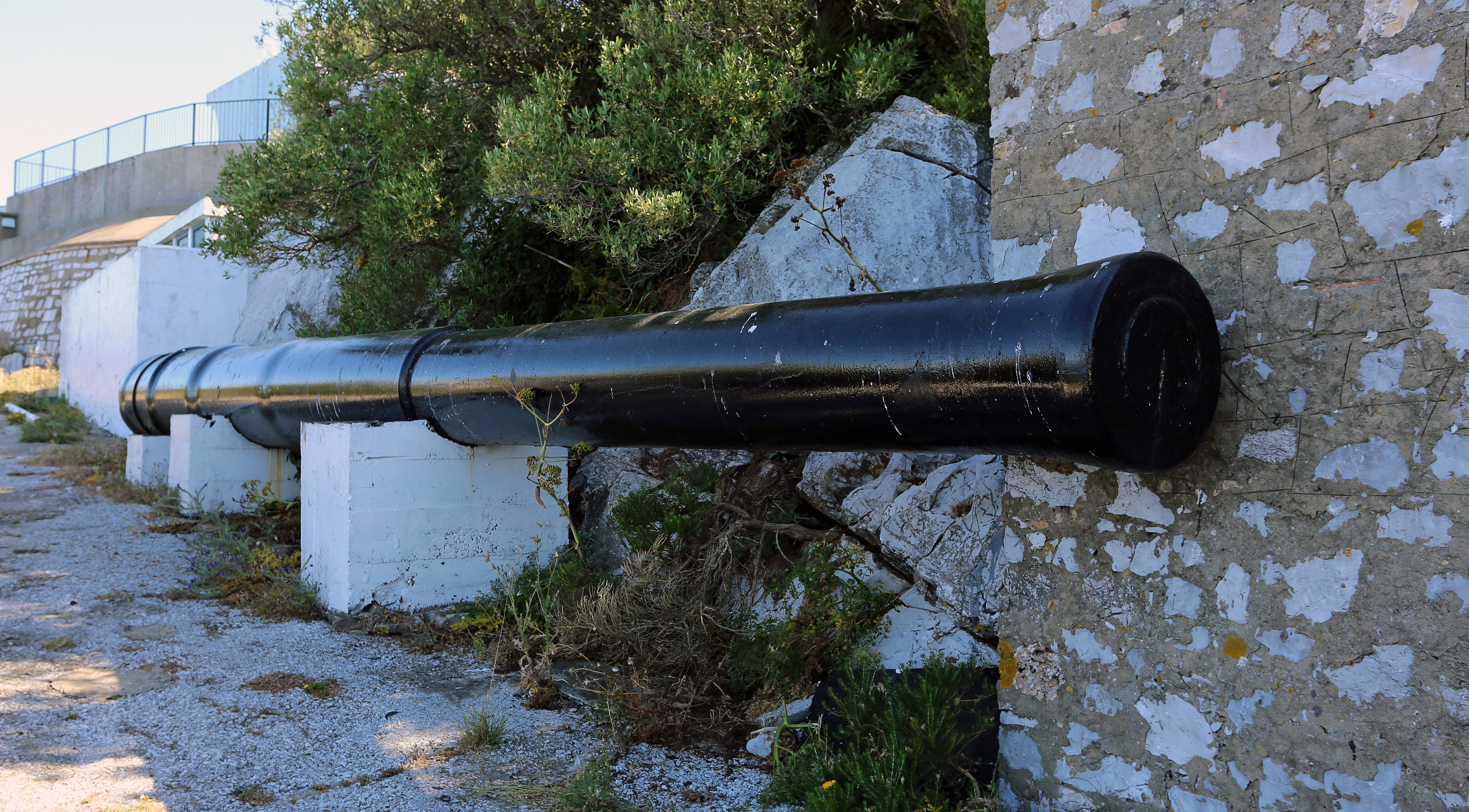
Spare gun barrel along path to Lord Airey's Battery from O'Hara's Battery

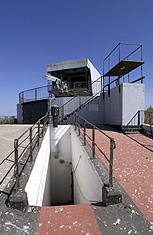
Stairway to underground magazine; gun and enclosure in background

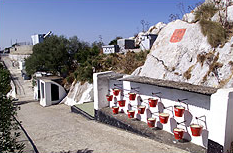
Path from O'Hara's Battery to Lord Airey's Battery
at top left

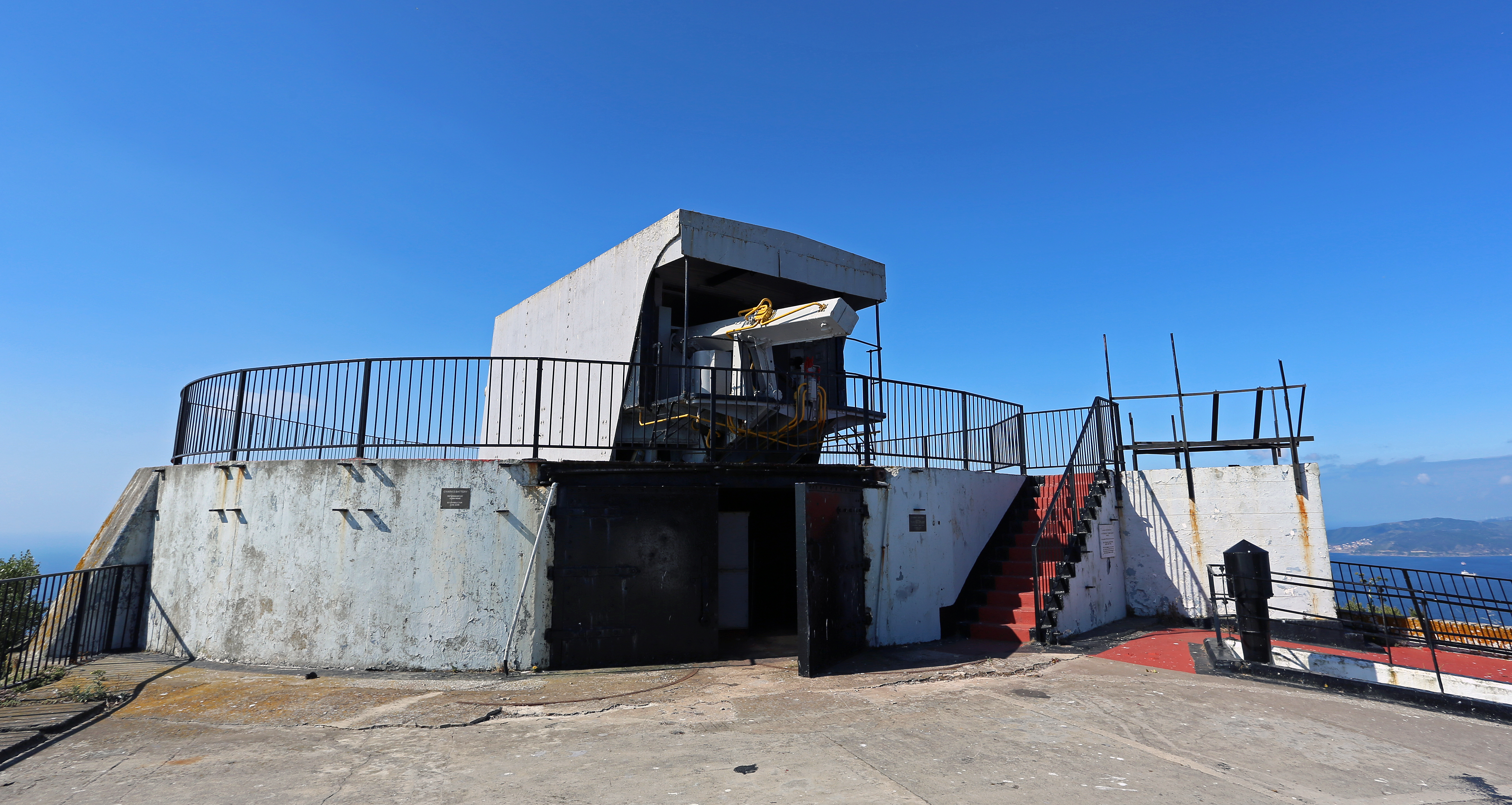
The gun

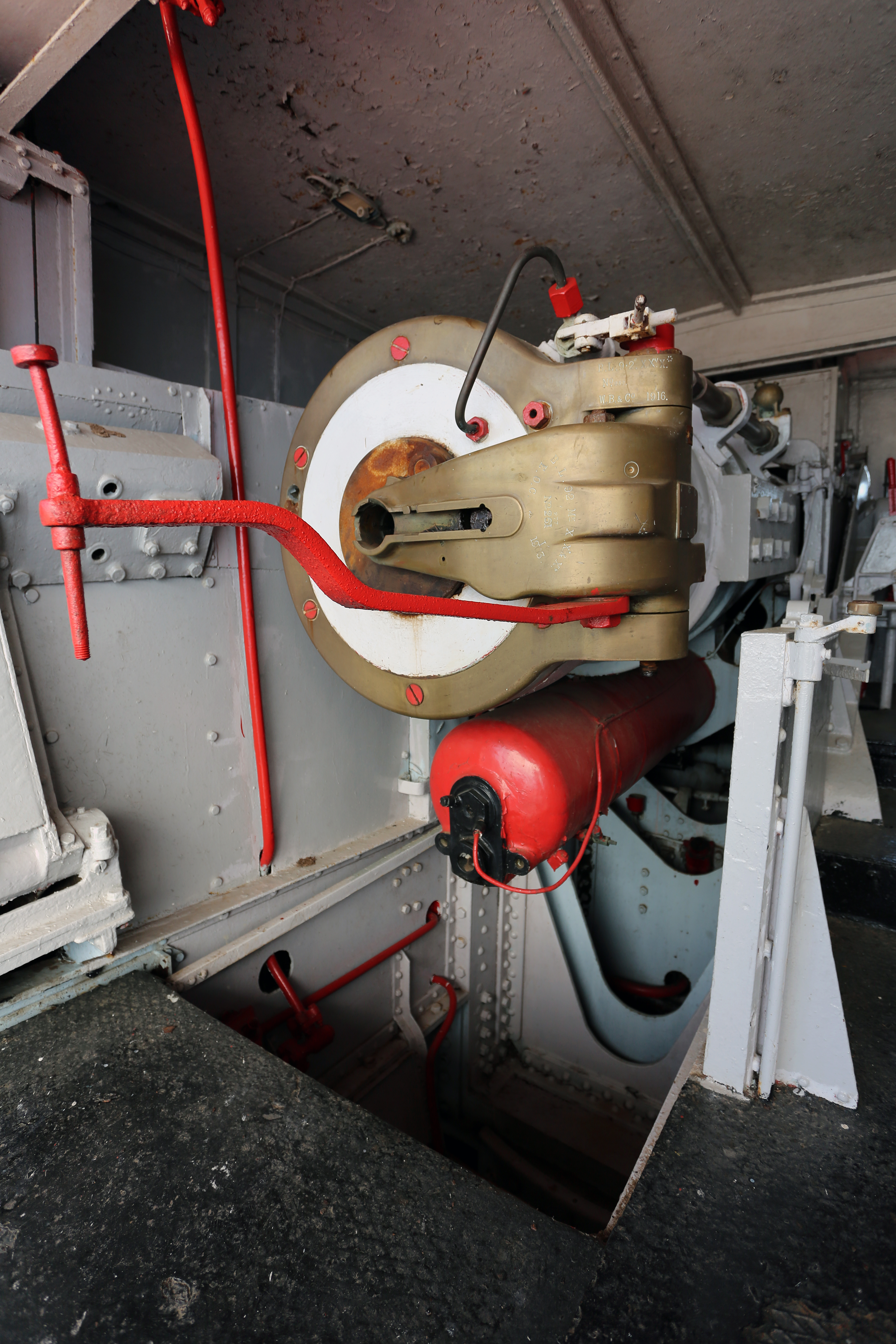
Breech of the gun
