= Goat's Hair Twin Caves =

Cave in the British Overseas Territory of Gibraltar

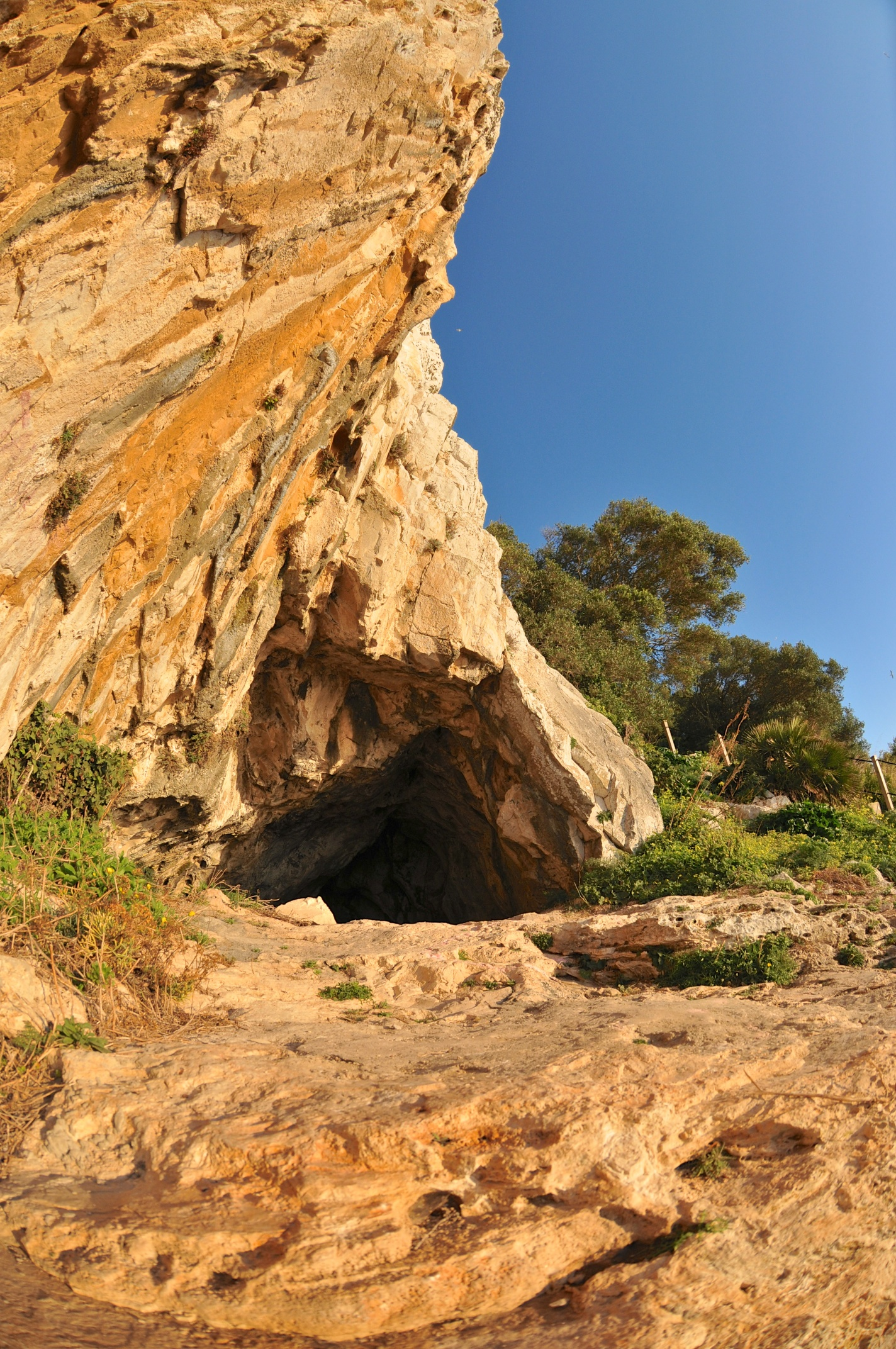
- One of the caves

- Location within Gibraltar
- Coordinates: 36°7′21.7″N 5°20′31.2″W
- Elevation: 190 metres
- Access: Mediterranean Steps

The Goat's Hair Twin Caves are in the British Overseas Territory of Gibraltar. The caves are listed in the Heritage and Antiquities Act as they are sites of Palaeolithic and Neolithic archaeology.

== Description ==
The two caves are located at 190 metres above sea level, situated side by side about 30 metres above the path leading to Martin’s Cave. Both caves have large, triangular-shaped entrances, and were formed along vertical fractures. Marine erosion is evident in both.

The Goat's Hair Twin Caves are a pair of sea "twin caves" situated on the eastern side of Gibraltar. This name was given to them as it was a goatherd refuge in the 19th century and this meant a large amount of goat's hair found attached to the cave walls. This site's original name is Sewell's Fig Tree Caves after Captain Sewell, who was also the discoverer of what is now often referred to as Cave S or Sewell's Cave. In 1867 these caves were explored and partly excavated by Captain Brome, a well-known explorer of Gibraltar's caves at the time.

One of these caves was then heavily excavated and emptied of all deposits by the Gibraltar cave research group, led by George Palao in November 1969 and reaching the caves bedrock in June 1970. During these excavations, there was the discovery of a "prehistoric ceremonial burial" on the northern wall of one of the two caves revealing a female human skeleton with a crushed skull surrounded by various pottery vessels, bone pendants, flint blades, armlets and anklets. There are descriptions of this excavation and the findings but there is no record of these finds having ever been deposited in the Gibraltar Museum and therefore there is no trace of this piece of Gibraltar's heritage.

== Today ==
In 2018 these caves were included in the caves listed in the Heritage and Antiquities Act by the Government of Gibraltar, noting that the caves were a Palaeolithic and Neolithic site.
