= After the Battle =

Military history magazine

- Issue No. 180
- Editor-in-Chief: Winston Ramsey
- Categories: History
- Frequency: Quarterly
- Circulation: 12,000
- Publisher: Battle of Britain International Limited
- Founded: 1973
- Country: United Kingdom
- Language: English
- Website: www.afterthebattle.com

After the Battle was a military history magazine published quarterly in the United Kingdom by Battle of Britain International Limited between 1973 and 2022.

== History and profile ==
After the Battle was first published in 1973, and appeared on 15 February, May, August and November each year. The editor-in-chief since 1973 was Winston Ramsey, assisted by his co-author Gail Parker Ramsey, and editor Karel Margry.

The magazine dealt with World War II in a "then and now format". Articles were illustrated by historical photographs matched with a modern-day photograph of the identical scene to show how much (or how little) things have changed. Most issues featured a major article on a specific subject, with several smaller articles. All areas of the world were written about.

There were also occasional features on related subjects such as war films, vehicle preservation, war memorials.

Pen and Sword Books took over the title, but have not produced new issues since No. 195, labelled the final issue.
