= Gibraltar Nature Reserve =

Protected nature reserve in Gibraltar

- IUCN category V (protected landscape/seascape)
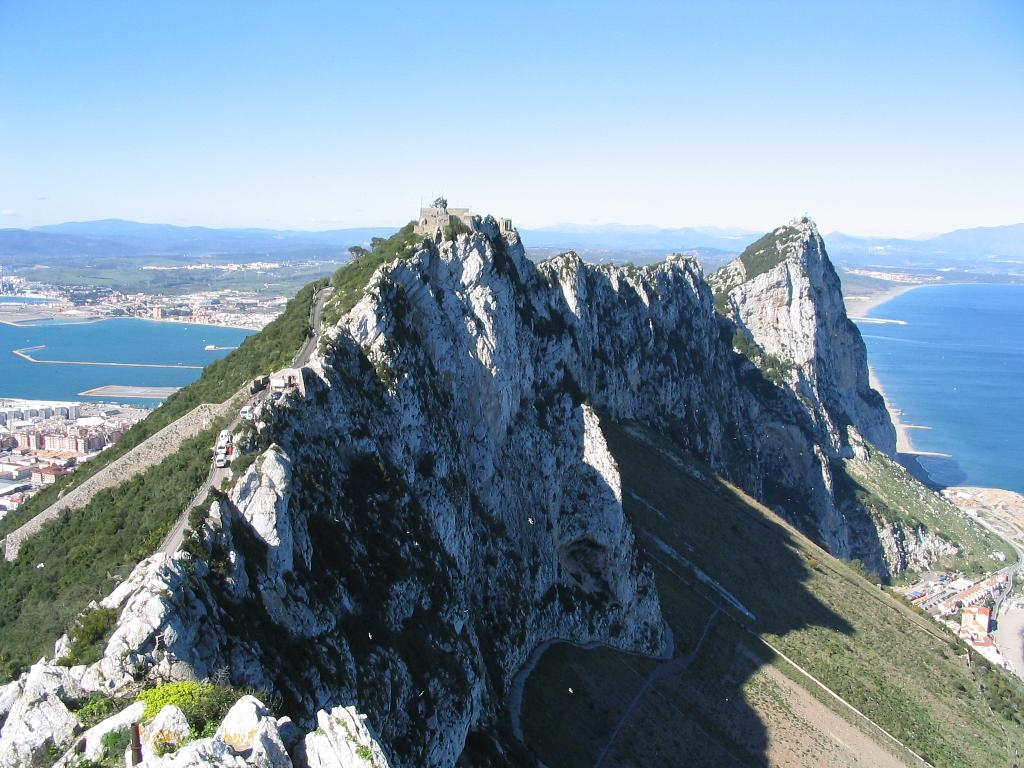
- View north along the spine of the Rock of Gibraltar, within the nature reserve looking towards Spain.

- The nature reserve is coloured in the light shaded area, facing the Alboran Sea.
- Location: Rock of Gibraltar, Great Gibraltar Sand Dune, Windmill Hill and Europa Foreshore, British Overseas Territory of Gibraltar, United Kingdom
- Nearest city: Gibraltar
- Coordinates: 36°08′43″N 05°20′35″W
- Established: 1993 (extended in 2013)
- Governing body: Gibraltar Ornithological and Natural History Society on behalf of the Government of Gibraltar
- Website: https://naturereserve.gi

The Gibraltar Nature Reserve (formerly the Upper Rock Nature Reserve) is a protected nature reserve in the British Overseas Territory of Gibraltar that covers over 40% of the territory's land area. It was established as the Upper Rock Nature Reserve in 1993 under the International Union for Conservation of Nature's category Ia (strict nature reserve) and was last extended in 2013. It is known for its semi-wild population of Barbary macaques, and is an important resting point for migrating birds.

== Location ==
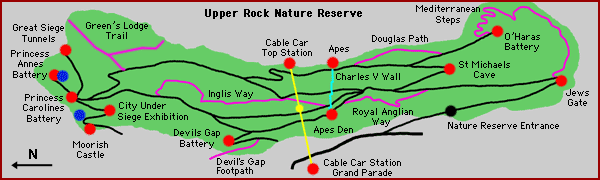
Map of the former Upper Rock Nature Reserve (north is to the left).

Originally named the Upper Rock Nature Reserve, it was limited to the upper part of the Rock of Gibraltar, a long and narrow limestone peninsula that rises to a height of 426 metres (1,398 ft) above sea level. The Rock is part of the Betic Cordillera, formed about 200 million years ago. From the crest of the rock there is a dramatic view of the area, including Spain across the Bay of Gibraltar and Jebel Musa of Morocco across the Strait of Gibraltar. It is an area of considerable natural beauty and one of the main tourist attractions in Gibraltar.

The Upper Rock area of the nature reserve can be reached by road or by the Gibraltar Cable Car, next to the Gibraltar Botanic Gardens.

== Designation ==
The reserve was established in 1993 to protect the area of land that the United Kingdom's Ministry of Defence had decommissioned from military use. Its purpose is to preserve the wildlife and natural and historical sites, while providing access to the public. The flora and fauna of the nature reserve are protected by the law of Gibraltar.

The nature reserve was last extended in 2013 when it was renamed the Gibraltar Nature Reserve to reflect its wider scope outside the Upper Rock. The protected area now covers the Great Gibraltar Sand Dune, Windmill Hill and the Europa Foreshore.

== Climate ==
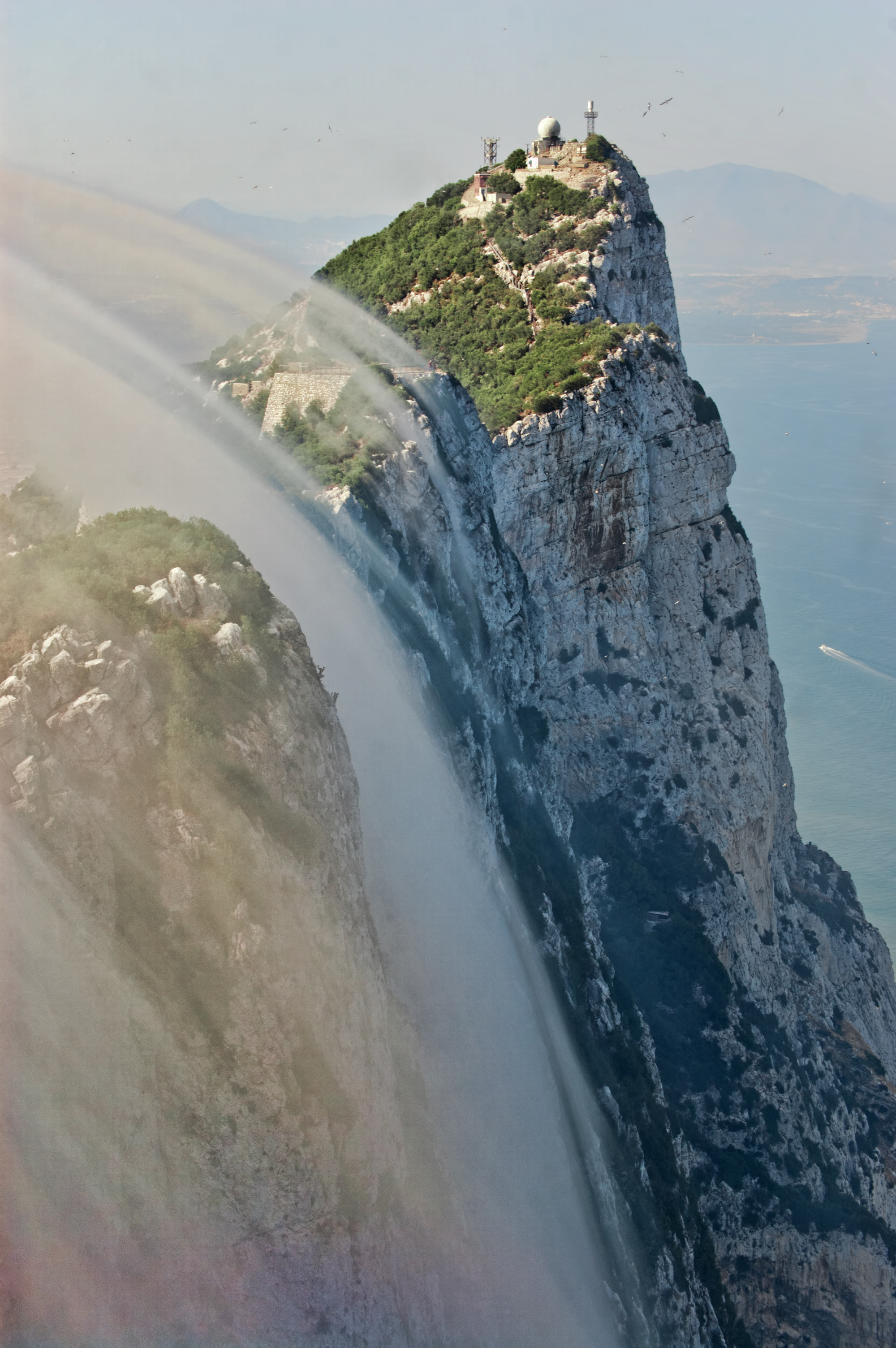
Levant cloud forming against the eastern cliffs of the Rock of Gibraltar.

Gibraltar has a typical Mediterranean climate, moderated by the sea that almost surrounds the peninsula. Summers are warm and dry, while winters are cool and wet. Temperatures range from 13.4 to 24.2 °C (56.1 to 75.6 °F). Annual rainfall is about 768 millimetres (30.2 in). The Levanter clouds provide condensation that keeps the vegetation green even in the dry season. These clouds form when moisture-laden easterly winds are forced upward by the cliffs of Gibraltar, and often form a cap over the Rock.

== Tourist attractions including St. Michael's Cave ==
The nature reserve contains many of Gibraltar's important natural history sites including caves such as St. Michael's Cave, with its many stalagmites and stalactites. St. Michael's Cave was first mentioned by Pomponius Mela in 45 AD, and many sources have mentioned it since. It has become an important tourist attraction. Concerts are held in its main chamber. Forbes' Quarry is where the Neanderthal discovery was made in 1848. The Gibraltar 1 skull was one of the first to be found. Neanderthal skulls have also been found at the Devil's Tower Cave on the North Front. It is possible that some of the last Neanderthals may have made the caves of Gibraltar their home before they died out 30,000 years ago.

The Gibraltar Heritage Trust manages conservation of the historical sites and their development as tourist attractions. These include the O'Hara's Battery, 100 Ton Gun at Napier of Magdala Battery, Heritage Centre at Princess Caroline's Battery and the Parson's Lodge Battery. Other military sites that are open to the public are the Moorish Castle, Devil's Gap Battery, Princess Anne's Battery, World War II Tunnels, Great Siege Tunnels and Charles V Wall.

== Other caves ==
The Mediterranean Steps path within the Nature Reserve leads to the Goat's Hair Twin Caves and then Spider Cave. Spider Cave is a small solutional cave created from water running down the fissure below Lord Airey's Battery; this cave was widened for military use during World War II. Spider Cave is inhabited by the Gibraltar funnel-web spider, and formerly hosted a colony of about 100 Schreibers' bats in the 1960s, but there was no recent sign of the bats in 2005.

At the southern end of Gibraltar Nature Reserve lies a series of caves: Levant Cave, George's Bottom Cave and Gibbon's Cave. The first two caves are close together, accompanied by Tina's Fissure. Levant Cave was discovered during military tunnelling and has similar formations to New St. Michael's Cave. Gibbon's Cave was mostly destroyed due to tunnelling. George's Bottom Cave was discovered in 1965, named after George Palao, and had a boulder blocking the cave entrance which was shifted away using machinery. The passage of George's Bottom Cave is tight, requiring crawling at some points, including the entrance. Crawling is made no easier by the cave coral which together with the curtains, columns, straws, and helictites create a variety of formations. George's Bottom Cave has six descending levels and many chambers.

== Flora ==
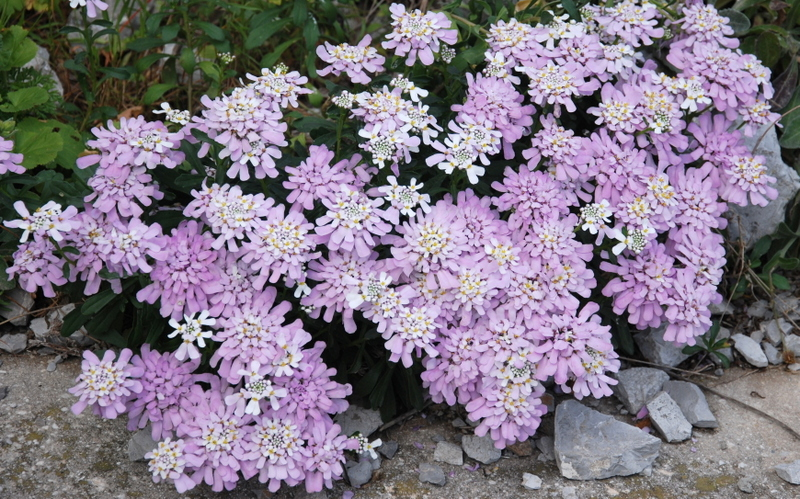
Gibraltar candytuft

In the past, the Upper Rock was tree-covered. Most of the trees were felled for fuel during the Great Siege of Gibraltar between 1779 and 1783. Trees today mostly produce berries that are eaten by birds, who presumably dropped their seeds on the rock. The most common is the olive (Olea europea). Carob (Ceratonia siliqua) and nettle trees (Celtis) are also found. Trees have been planted along the paths, including the stone pine (Pinus pinea) and Aleppo pine (Pinus halepensis). Both are native to the region, but the Aleppo pine is particularly common in dry, limestone regions. There was a drought in the 1990s when many of the introduced trees died, although the Aleppo pine fared better than others.

Gibraltar has more than six hundred species of flowering plants. The maquis, or dense Mediterranean scrub, is mostly made up of tall bushes that include wild olive, Mediterranean buckthorn, lentisc, Osyris and terebinth, and smaller bushes that include shrubby scorpion vetch, spiny broom, teline, wild jasmine, shrubby germander and felty germander. The bay laurel and the dwarf fan palm are also found in parts of the maquis. Understory plants include the intermediate periwinkle, Butcher's broom, Italian arum and Bear's breech. The firebreaks in the maquis are home to plants such as paper-white narcissus, common asphodel, giant Tangier fennel, wild gladiolus, Galactites and mallow bindweed.

There are small areas of garrigue in the reserve, low scrub that includes wild rosemary, esparto grass, white asparagus, toothed lavender, cut-leaved lavender, teline, Prasium, shrubby scorpion vetch and germanders. The many cliffs around the reserve harbour joint pine, dwarf fan palm, sweet alison, Biscutella and wild parsley. Distinctive plants include the Gibraltar candytuft, white Gibraltar chickweed, Gibraltar saxifrage and Gibraltar thyme. The Gibraltar campion is a very rare species found only on Gibraltar that was thought for a while to be extinct.

== Fauna ==
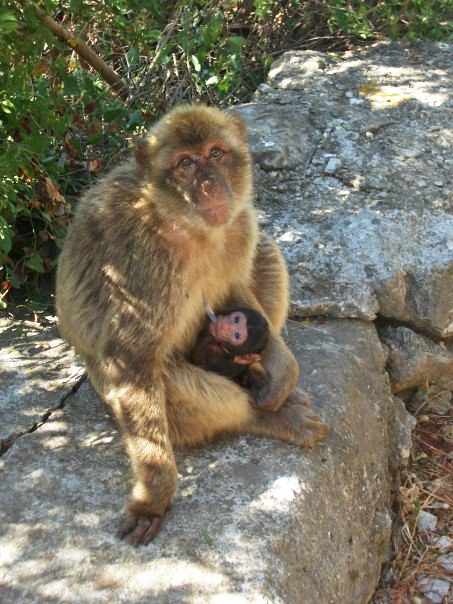
Female Barbary macaque feeding her young at Mediterranean Steps, on the Rock of Gibraltar.

=== Mammals ===
Mammals include the red fox, European rabbit and mouse-eared bat. The best-known residents are the Barbary macaques that make the reserve their home. Gibraltar has a reintroduced population of Barbary macaques, the only wild primate species in Europe, the famous Rock apes. The macaques may be found at the Ape's Den near the middle cable-car station, at the top cable car station, and near the Great Siege Tunnels. As of 2012 there were from 200 to 250 macaques, all of them living in the nature reserve. It is forbidden to feed the monkeys, but these rules have not always been followed. As a result, some of them have become aggressive and dependent on food from humans. In 2008 the government ordered a group of macaques to be culled that had taken to scavenging in the town centre.

=== Reptiles ===
There are five species of lizard in the nature reserve, six snakes and an amphisbaenian. This last is a small, subterranean reptile that has no legs and no eyes. The most common lizard is the small green or brown Iberian wall lizard. The larger Algerian sand racer and the mainly nocturnal Moorish gecko are also common. Rarer lizards are the Turkish gecko and the ocellated lizard. Snakes include the horseshoe whip snake, Montpellier snake, southern smooth snake, false smooth snake, grass snake and ladder snake.

=== Birds ===
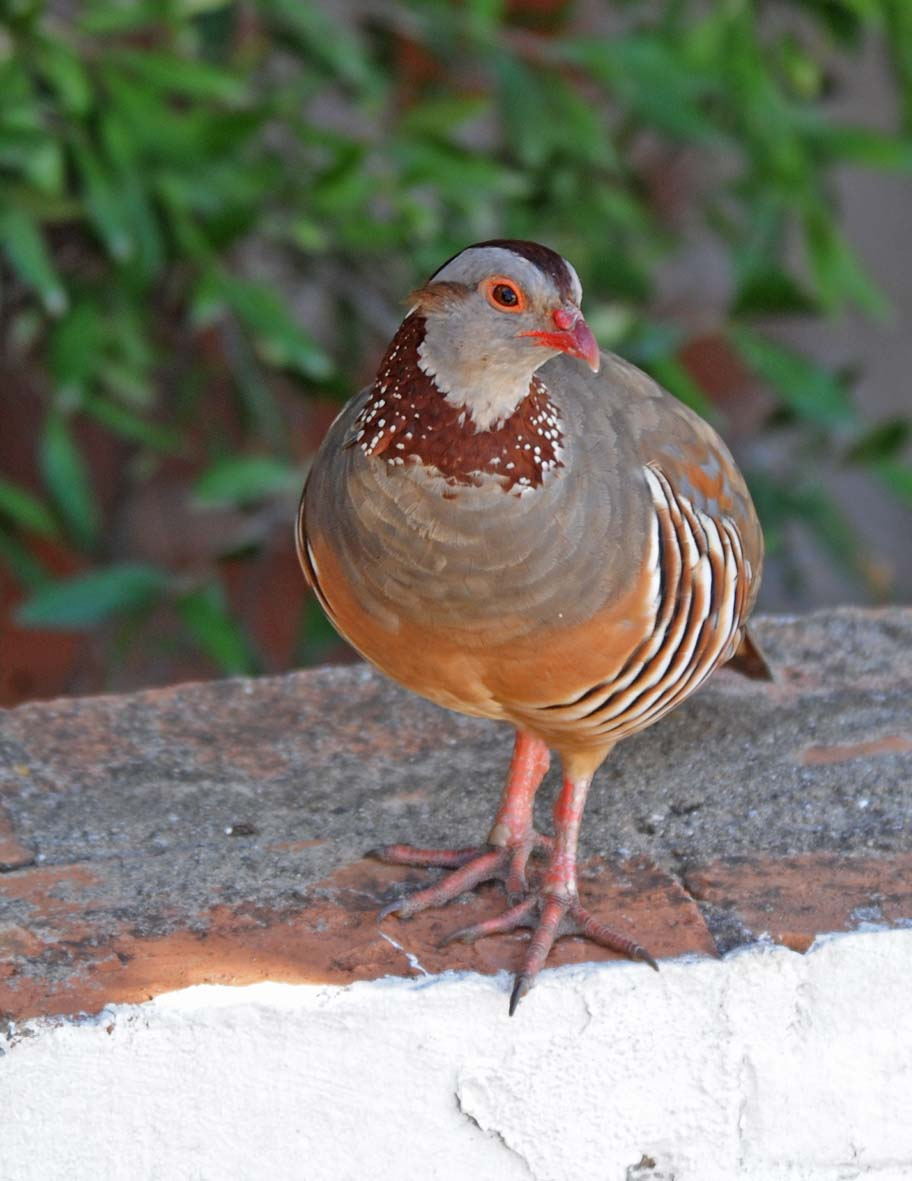
The Barbary partridge breeds on the Rock of Gibraltar and nowhere else on mainland Europe

The Rock of Gibraltar, at the head of the Strait, is a prominent headland, which accumulates migrating birds during the passage periods. The vegetation on the Rock, unique in southern Iberia, provides a temporary home for many species of migratory birds that stop to rest and feed before continuing migration for their crossing over the sea and desert. In spring, they return to replenish before continuing their journeys to Western Europe, journeys which may take them as far as Greenland or Russia.

The Rock has been identified as an Important Bird Area by BirdLife International because it is a migratory bottleneck, or choke point, for an estimated 250,000 raptors that cross the Strait annually, and because it supports breeding populations of Barbary partridges and lesser kestrels.

=== Invertebrates ===
There are many insects in the reserve. In the late summer, praying mantises are conspicuous, as are dragonflies crossing the strait. 33 species of butterfly have been observed, including the Cleopatra, two-tailed pasha, swallowtail, Spanish festoon and striped greyling. Moths that may be seen at times include the burnet moth, hummingbird hawkmoth, striped hawkmoth and cream-spot tiger. The most notable spider is the large, black and hairy Gibraltar funnel-web spider. The fast and aggressive Scolopendra cingulata centipede is also notable. Both the spider and the centipede have venomous but not fatal bites.

== Gallery ==
- Animals of Gibraltar on Wikimedia Commons
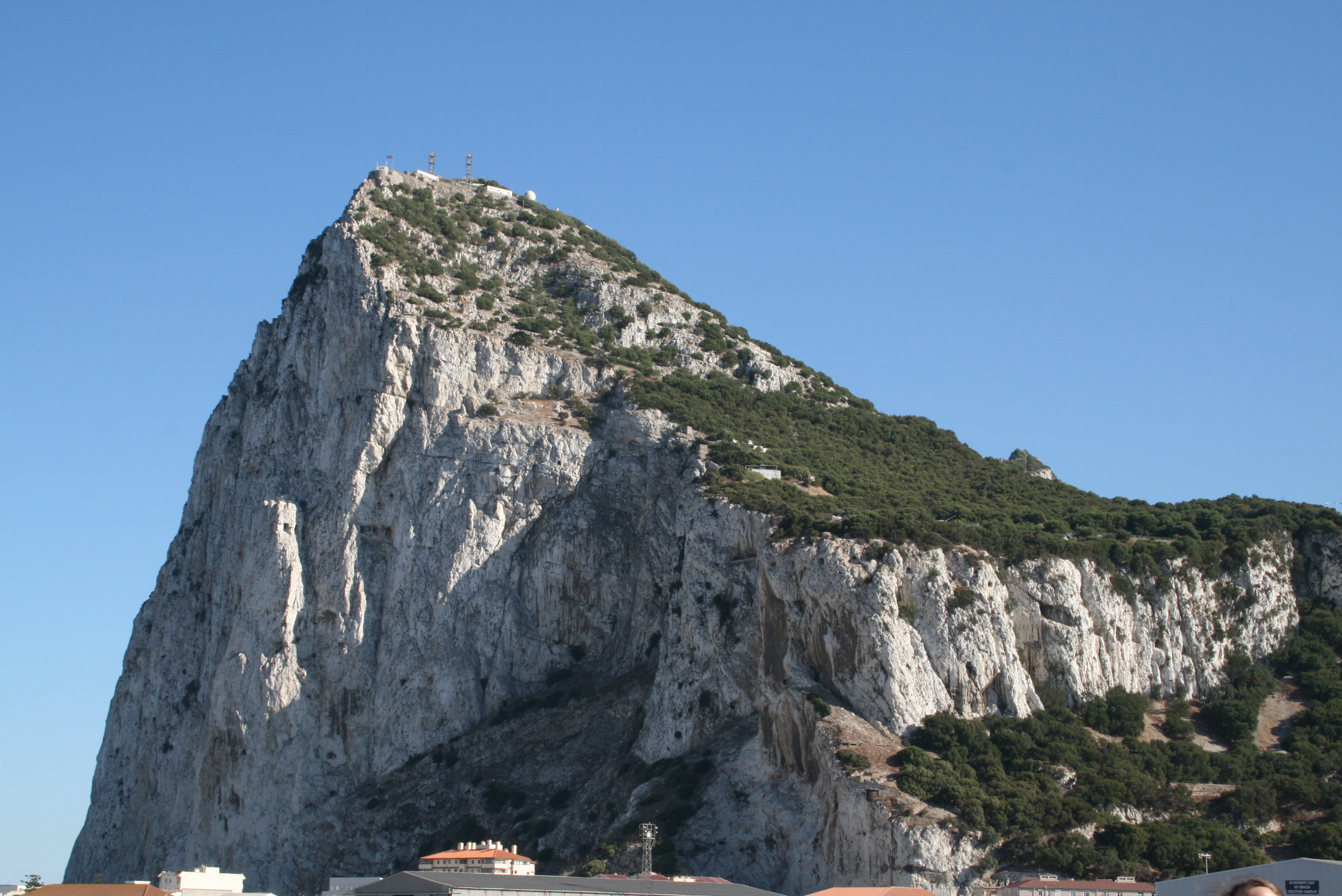
Northern peak of the Rock of Gibraltar

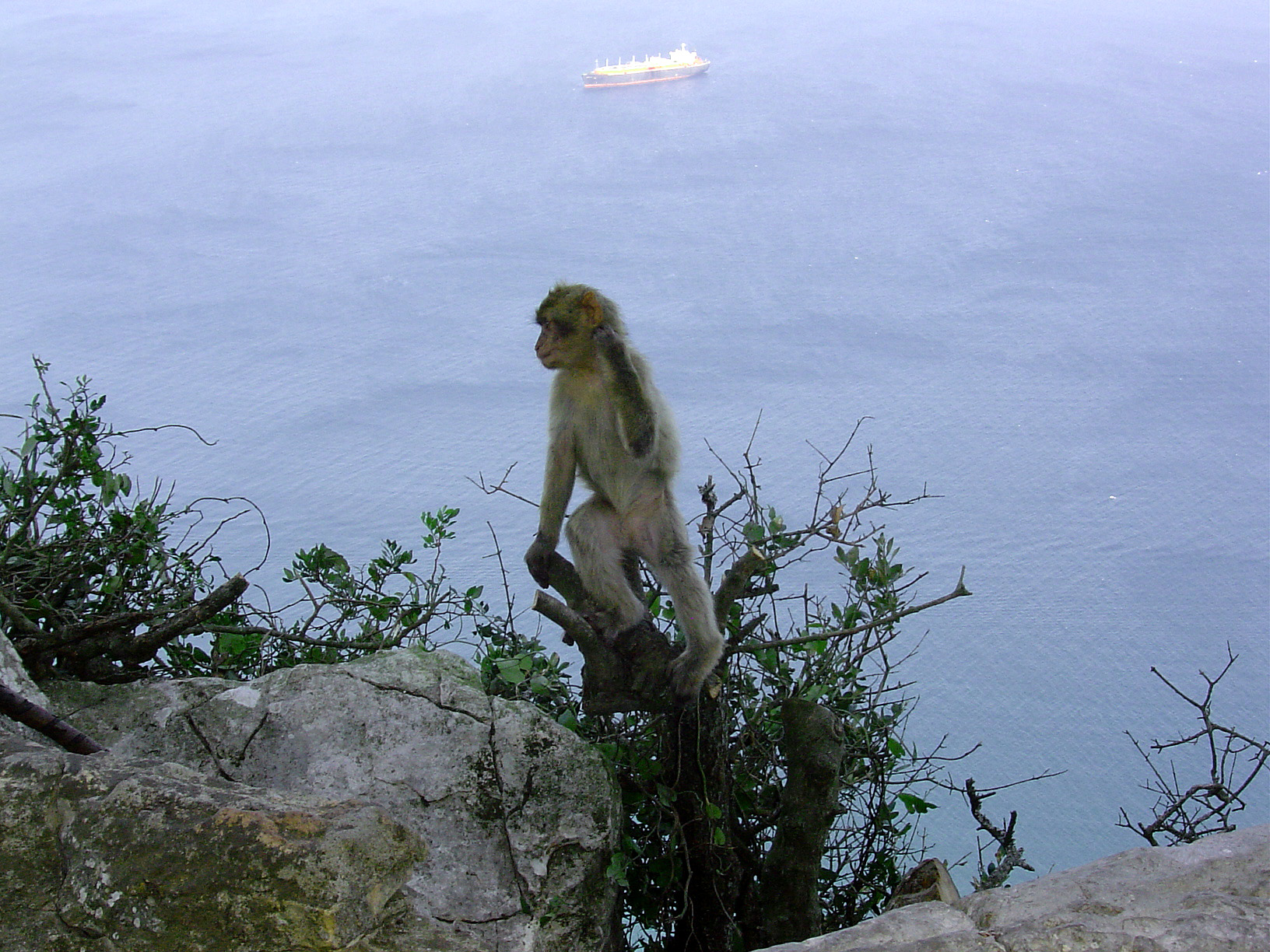
A Barbary macaque

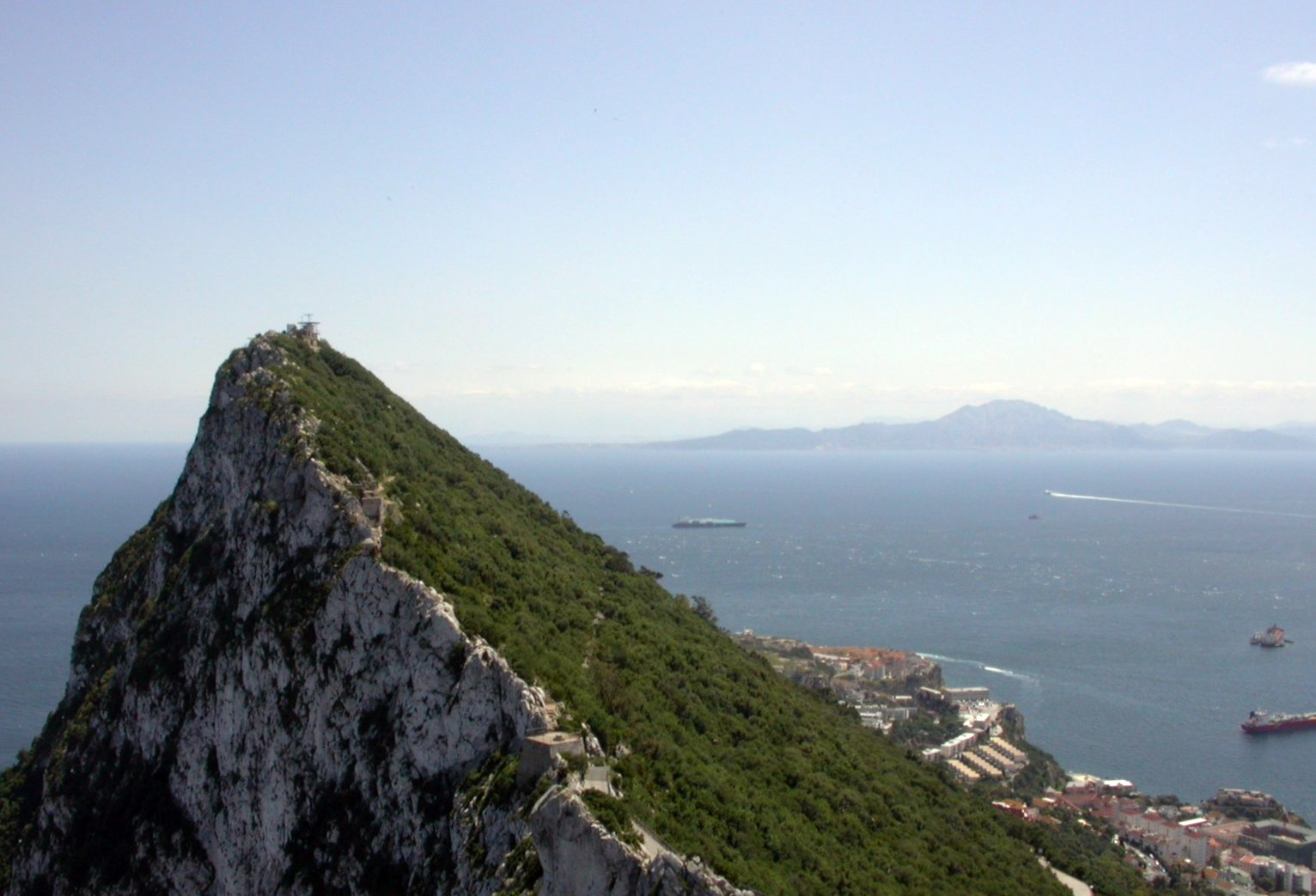
View of the African coast

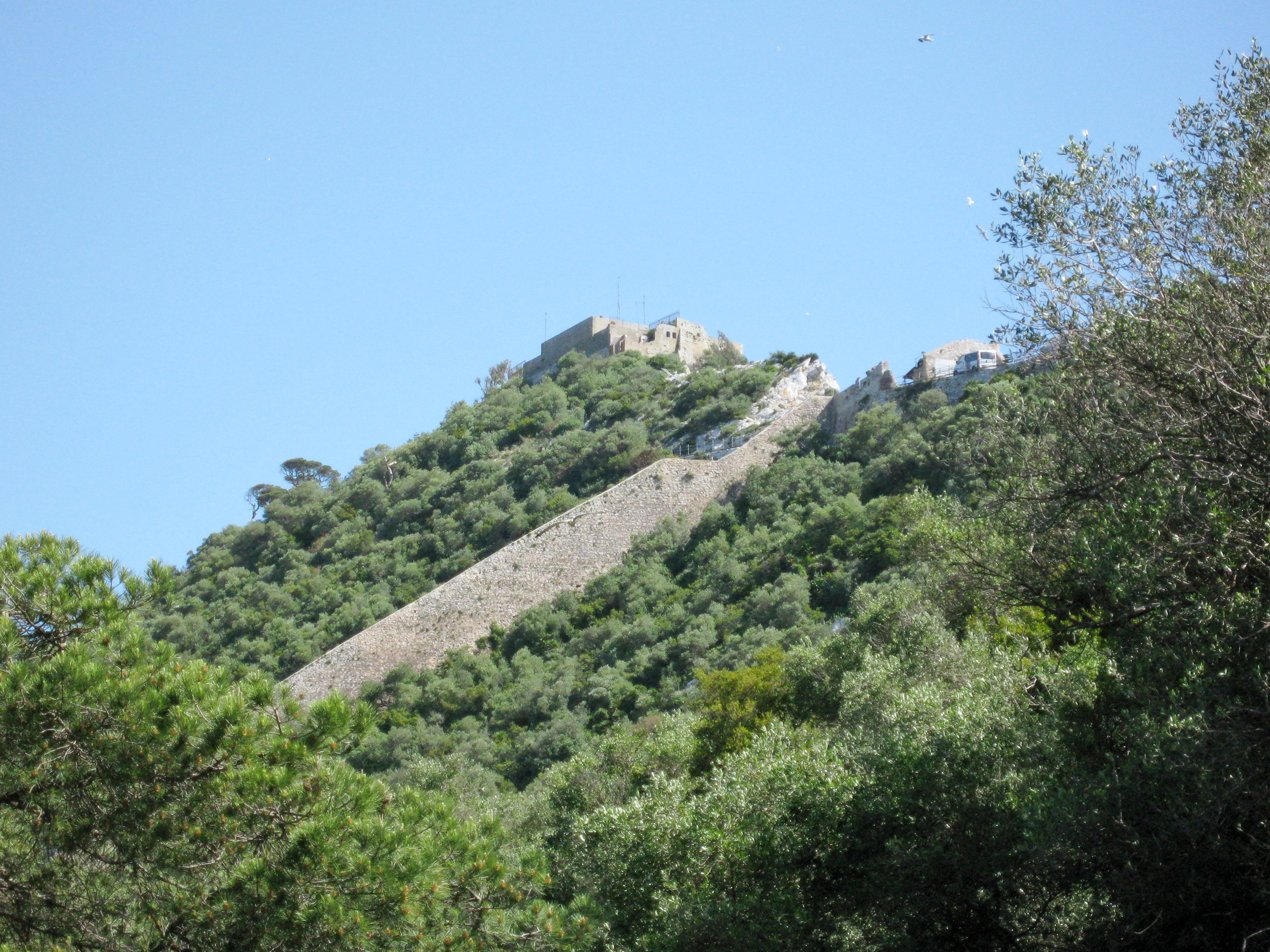
Top of the Charles V Wall
