= List of caves in Gibraltar =

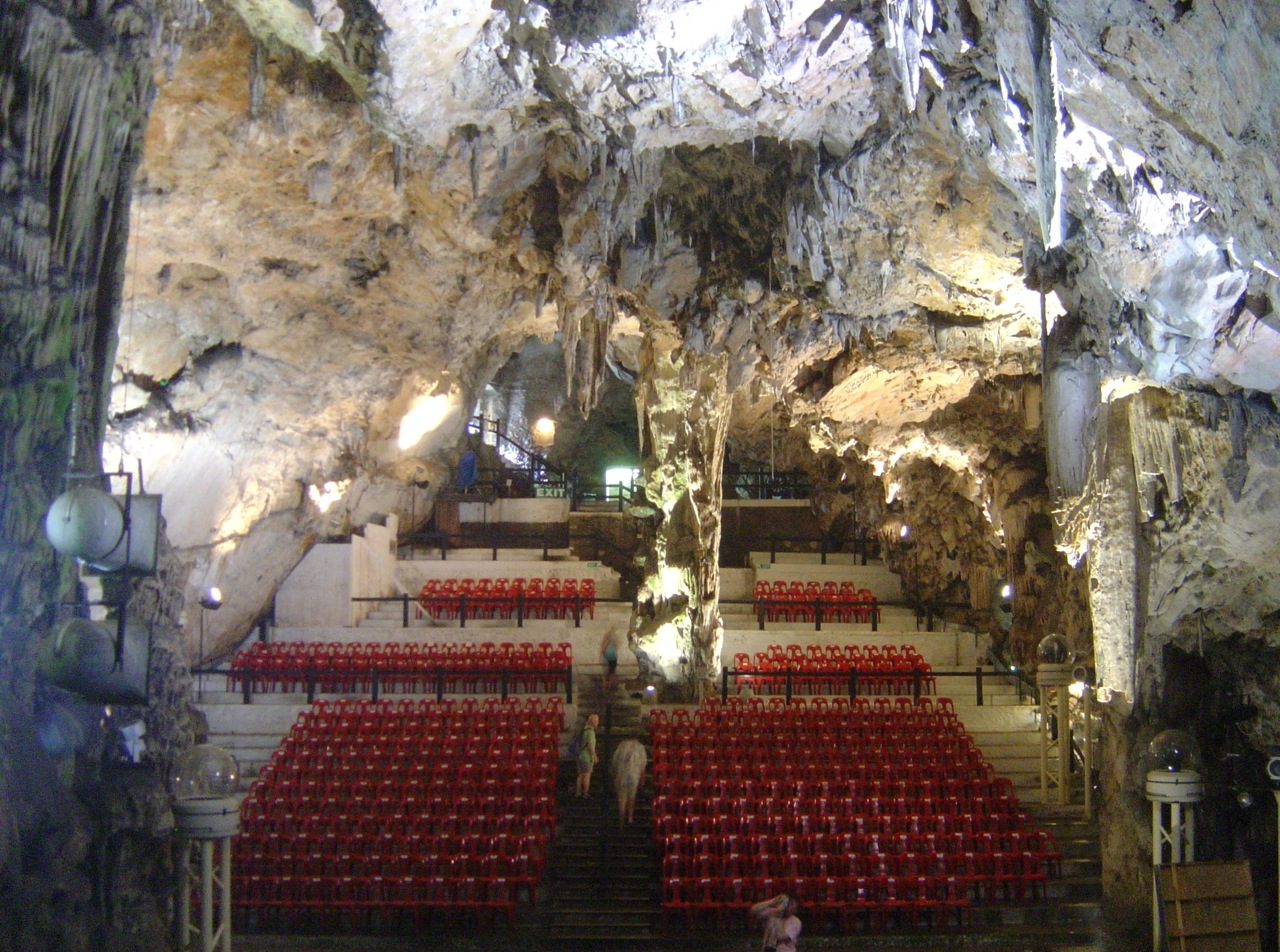
One of the most remarkable of Gibraltar's many caves is St Michael's, large enough to house this comfortable auditorium.

This is a list of all discovered caves in Gibraltar.

== Underwater ==
Caves form above sea level, and the reason for some caves being located below sea level is that for much of the last 100 thousand years, sea level has been lower than its present level, by up to 120m. This means that the caves which are now underwater may at one time have been lived in by people. These caves are the subject of research projects.

== Caves above sea level ==
The caves within the Rock of Gibraltar have been used as shelter during sieges and attacks on the islands for hundreds of years. The caves have also been used to store water and ammunition on a routine basis, and historically Neanderthals lived in a number of the caves.

There are thought to be over 200 caves in Gibraltar. These are the caves that are above ground:

- Abbot's Cave (Cueva de los Abades)
- Alameda Grotto
- Ape's Den Cave
- Beefsteak Cave
- Bell's Backyard Cave
- Bellman's Cave
- Bennett's Cave
- Blackstrap Cave
- Boathoist Cave (Bulman's Cave)
- Bray's Cave
- Brown's Cave
- Buena Vista Cave
- Buffadero Cave
- Caleta Palace Cave
- Camp Bay Cave (Parson's Lodge)
- Catalan Bay Road Cave
- Catalan Bay Cave
- Catchment Cave
- Cave S
- Collin's Cave
- Comcen Cave
- Coptic Cave
- Cormorant Cave
- Cousin's Cave
- Crystal Cave
- Crystal Cavern
- Cumberland Cave
- Dead Man's Cave
- Devil's Dustbin
- Devil's Fall
- Devil's Fall (North)
- Devil's Fall (West-Upper) (Crack Cave)
- Devil's Fall (West-Lower)
- Devil's Gap Cave
- Devil's Tower Cave (Mousterian Shelter)
- Dickson's Cavee
- Diesel's Delight
- Douglas Cave
- Dudley Ward's Cave
- East Queen's Line Cave
- Europa Advance Cave
- Europa Pass Cave
- Fig Tree Cave
- Fig Tree Cave 2
- Forbes' Quarry Cave
- Genista Caves
  - Genista Cave 1
  - Genista Cave 2
  - Genista Cave 3
  - Genista Cave 4
- George's Bottom Cave
- Gibbon's Cave
- Glen Rocky Cave
- Glen Rocky Shelter Cave
- Goat's Hair Twin Caves
- Goat's Head Cave
- Gorham's Cave
- Gunn's Cave
- Harley Street Fissure
- Hayne's Cave
- Holy Boy's Cave
- Horseshoe Cave
- Ince's Cave
- John's Giant Cave
- Judge's Cave
- Landport Cave (Leary's Cave)
- Leonora's Cave
- Levant Cave
- Liddell's Union Fissure
- Lookout Cave (Hole in the Wall)
- Mammoth Cave (Signal Station Cave)
- Marble Arch Cave
- Martin's Cave
- Martin's Guard Cave 1 & 2
- McNeil's Cave
- Mediterranean Cave
- Middle Hill Cave
- Monkey's Cave
- Moorish Castle Barracks Cave
- Moor's Cave (Cueva del Moro)
- Mount Misery Fissure
- Mousterian Rock Shelter
- Mushroom Cave
- "Nameless" Cave
- Nursery Cave
- O'Hara's Cave
- "Operation Monkey" Cave
- Painter's Cave
- Parson's Lodge Cave
- Pete's Paradise Cave
- Poca Roca Cave
- Queen's Cave
- Queen's Lines Cave
- Queen's Road Caves
- Ragged Staff Cave
- Reservoir Cave No. 4
- Reservoir Cave No. 5
- Reservoir Fissure
- Rifle Dustbin
- Rock Fall Cave
- Rock Gun Cave
- Rock Gun Catchment Shelter
- Ronald's Delight
- St. Michael's Cave, Old
- St. Michael's Cave, New
- St. Michael's Cave, Lower Lower
- St. Michael's Cave, Roof Passage
- Sandy Cave Lower
- Sandy Cave Upper
- Sapper's Bog Scorpion Cave
- Sea Caves
- Shed Cave
- Signal Troop Cave
- Smart's Well Reserve
- Smith's Cave
- Smuggler's Cave
- South Cave
- Spanish Mine
- Spider Cave
- Spur Road Cave
- Star Chamber Cave
- Swallow's Nest Cave
- Tina's Fissure
- Transmitter Fissure Treasure Cave
- Vanguard Cave
- Viney Quarry Cave
- William's Cave
- Wilson's Cave
- Winkies Cave

== See also ==
- List of caves
- Speleology
