= Bray's Cave =

Bray Cave in the UK

Coordinates: 36°07′47″N 5°20′43″W

- Interactive map of Bray's Cave
- Location: Upper Rock Nature Reserve, Gibraltar
- Elevation: 400 metres (1,300 ft)
- Geology: limestone
- Entrances: 1
- Show cave opened: No
- Lighting: None

Bray's Cave is a limestone cave in the British Overseas Territory of Gibraltar. The cave has yielded several significant human remains and artifacts from the Neolithic and Bronze Ages. Three almost complete skulls were discovered, along with other cranial fragments from multiple individuals. This suggests that people repeatedly returned to the site to reuse it as a burial ground.

== Description ==
Bray's Cave is located at a height of 400 metres (1,300 ft) above sea level on the western slopes of the Rock of Gibraltar, within the Upper Rock Nature Reserve. It is on the western slopes of the Rock where caves are far less common than on the eastern cliffs where sea caves like Gorham's Cave or Vanguard Cave are located. Before archaeological excavations began, the cave was almost entirely infilled with carstic detritus and some foothill sediments as well as large boulders from past rockfalls, giving the cave the characteristics of a rock shelter. The arduous excavation process not only revealed its important archaeological sequence but also the true nature of this cave; the cave was formed along the stratification joints of the limestone levels, in a north-south direction dipping to the west, with a varied range of speleothems typical of closed cavities with a gallery morphology.

== Archaeology ==
=== Stratigraphy ===
The cave's sequence features three phases of human occupation with clearly differentiated sedimentary levels, in addition to a further two levels which are archaeologically sterile:

==== Level I ====
Period of modern-contemporary use, ranging from the 18th to 20th centuries.

==== Level II ====
Period of medieval occupation. The level has been identified, through the ceramic and zooarchaeological record, as a 14th-century Marinid occupation of a pastoral character, whereby the occupants made use of the cave as a 'refuge' leaving behind the remains of their ceramic belongings and hearths.

==== Level III ====
Bronze Age occupation with funerary use. It develops around rimstone formations as well as the caves floor and walls, forming an organised and hierarchical burial area.

=== Marinid shepherds ===
Madinat al-Fath, or the City of Victory, was built by the Almohads in the 12th century and is the predecessor of modern-day Gibraltar. It was a key stronghold for the Marinid Protectorate in the Iberian Peninsula, and this can be seen in the remaining structures, such as the Moorish Castle and Tower of Homage, as well as archaeological discoveries at the Gibraltar.

The remains at Bray's Cave are characteristic of sporadic pastoral occupations, which during the Middle Ages continued to develop in many caves. A ceramic record was discovered consisting of cooking pots and bowls, along with large amounts of goat bones, many of them young, and hearth remains.

=== Bronze Age burials ===
Given the lack of data available in southern Iberia in relation to the Bronze Age, the discoveries unearthed at Bray's Cave are of great importance. Previous findings, conducted by George Palao at Judge's Cave, Pete's Paradise Cave and Devil's Fall Cave, excavations carried out by non-specialists, suggested that some of the caves of Gibraltar had had a funerary use.

A large circular-shaped rimstone with an approximate diameter of 1.5 metres (4 ft 11 in) is located towards the bottom of the cave; a significant accumulation of angular interlocked limestone clasts were documented here, constituting the closure of a burial of great archaeological interest where several secondary burials had been carried out adapting the rimstone as if it were a cist or niche.

The burials are scattered throughout the cave, demonstrating burial areas and areas resulting from the removal of these to be reused.

Along with the palaeontological remains, a ceramic record emerged consisting of common finds from this chrono-cultural period such as bowls with in-turned, straight or parabolic rims, large globular vessels and some pots. The goat and malacological remains that were documented are a reflection of the sources of nourishment of these communities.

The burials unearthed at Bray's Cave have added to the number of known burial sites of this period in southern Iberia, such as the Necrópolis de los Algarbes in Tarifa, La Loma del Puerco in Chiclana, El Estanquillo in San Fernando and El Cerro del Berrueco in Medina-Sidonia.

The Y-chromosomal haplogroup R1b-P312 and mitochondrial haplogroup T2e1 were identified in the sample I10941/120 (1900-1400 BC, Gibraltar_EBA) of the Bray Cave.
