= Boathoist Cave =

Sea cave in Gibraltar

Coordinates: 36°07′15″N 5°20′31″W

- Bulman's Cave
- Interactive map of Boathoist Cave

Boathoist Cave (or Boat Hoist Cave), also known as Bulman's Cave, is a huge sea cave on the south eastern flank of the British Overseas Territory of Gibraltar.

== Description ==
Boathoist Cave is only accessible from the east coast of Gibraltar by boat or from inside the Rock of Gibraltar. During World War II access steps were built from man-made tunnels inside the Rock. The steps were intended to be used as an escape route for the Governor of Gibraltar if the Rock was invaded under the Axis powers' planned Operation Felix. From the cave he could have been transported to a waiting submarine. This huge cave contains a beach which can be accessed by boat. This beach has been created by sand and debris blown out through the relatively small entrance.

This cave has been mentioned as one of the ten locations which include Vanguard Cave, Gorham's Cave, Ibex Cave and Bennett's Cave that give clear evidence on the Neanderthals of Gibraltar.

== See also ==
- List of caves in Gibraltar

== Sources ==
- Stringer, Chris (2000). "Gibraltar and the Neanderthals 1848-1998". In Stringer, Chris; Barton, R.N.E.; Finlayson, Clive (eds.). Neanderthals on the Edge: Papers from a Conference Marking the 150th Anniversary of the Forbes' Quarry Discovery, Gibraltar. Oxford: Oxbow Books. ISBN 9781842170151.
