= Ibex Cave =

Cave in Gibraltar

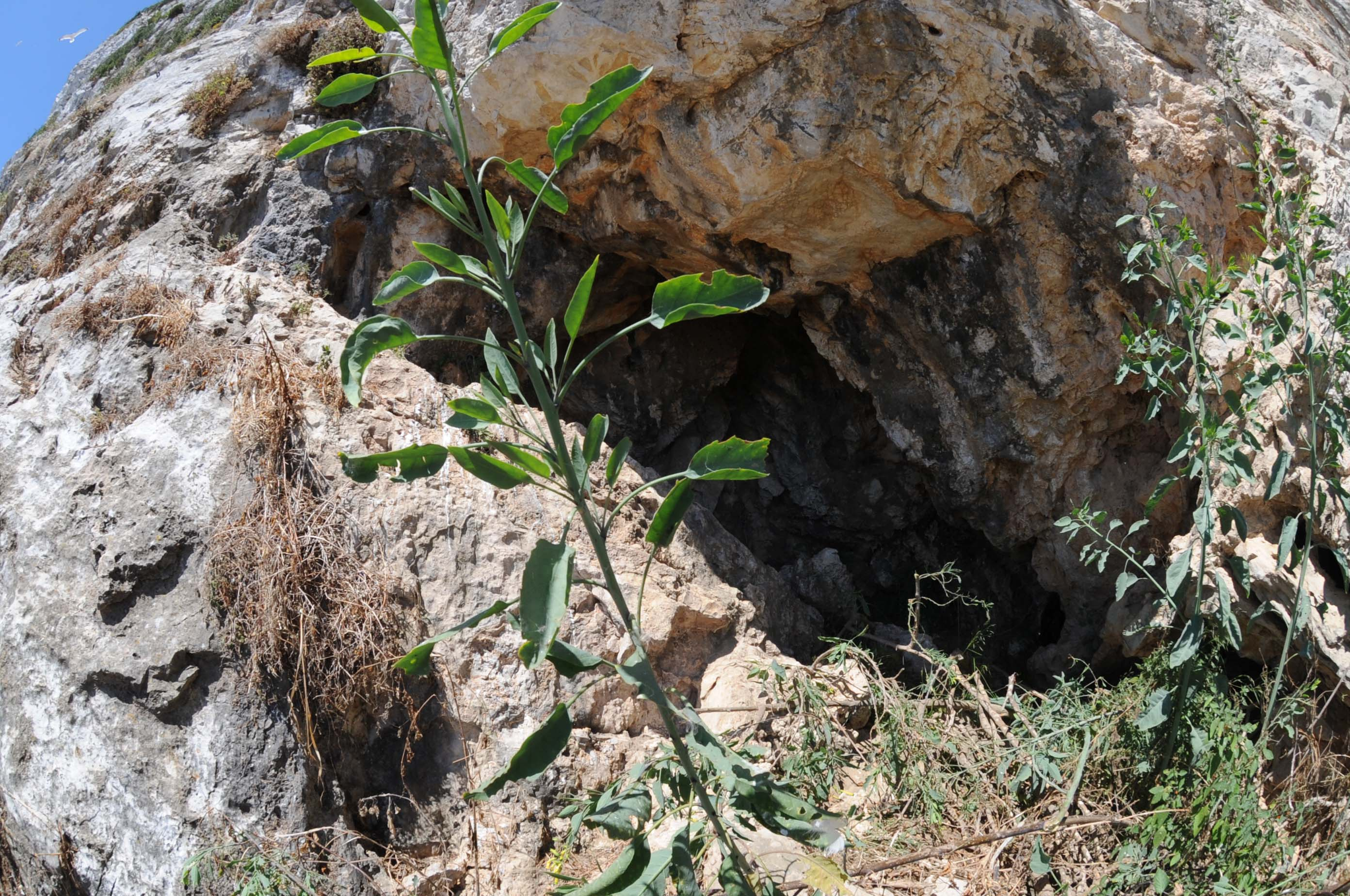
- Entrance to Ibex Cave.

- Location within Gibraltar
- Location: Eastern face of the Rock of Gibraltar, Gibraltar
- Coordinates: 36.134799°N 5.345538°W
- Discovery: 1975
- Geology: Limestone
- Entrances: 1

Ibex Cave is a limestone cave on the Rock of Gibraltar which has yielded stone artifacts of Mousterian tradition. It was discovered in 1975. It is so named as an ibex skull was found within the cave which would have been hunted by the Neanderthals of Gibraltar thousands of years ago. Ibex Cave was named and excavated by the Gibraltar Museum in 1994. Its first formal description was in 1999. It is protected by the Heritage and Antiquities Act 2018 of the Government of Gibraltar.

== History ==
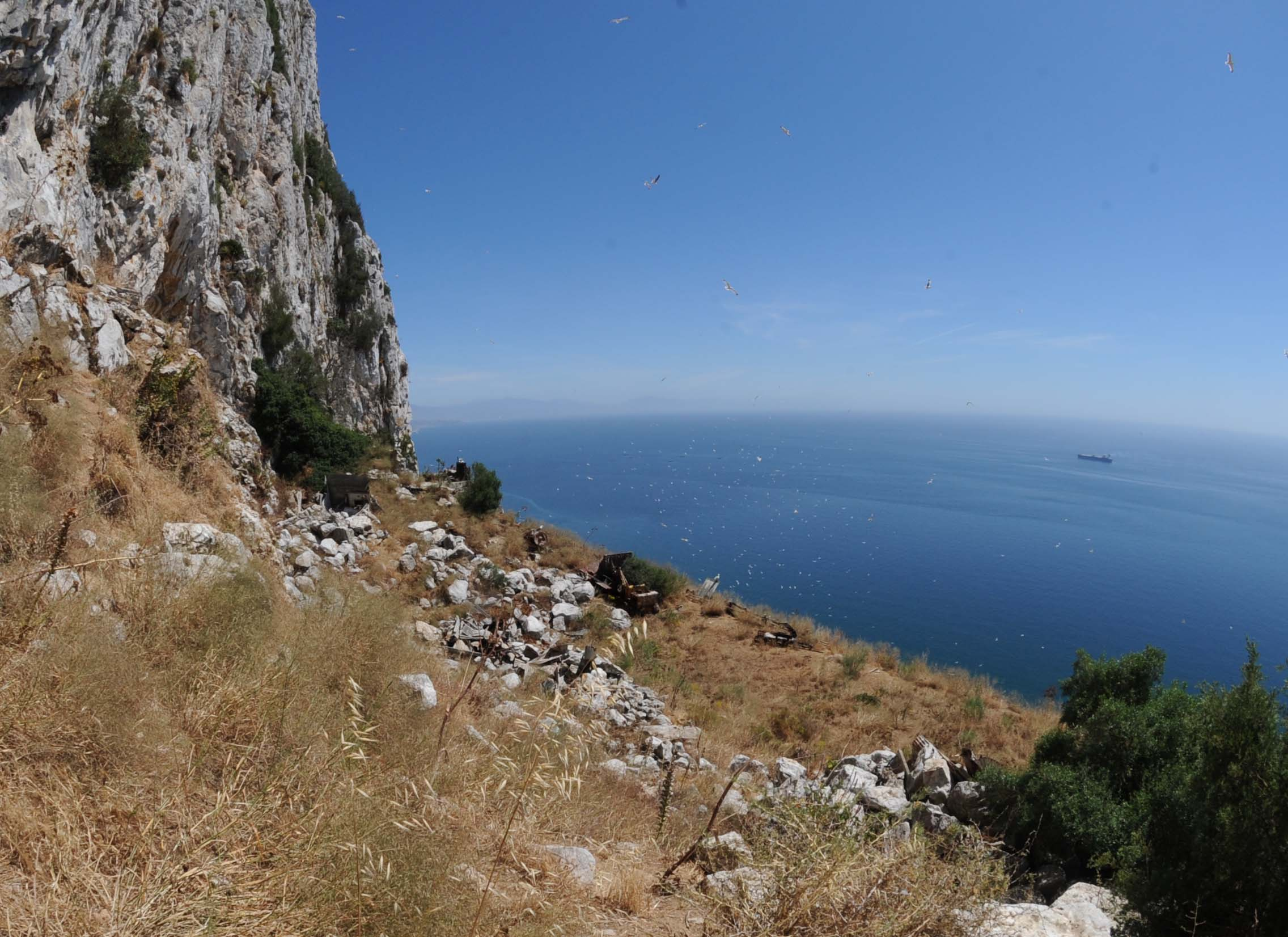
View over the Alboran Sea from the entrance to Ibex Cave.

Ibex Cave was named and excavated by the Gibraltar Museum in 1994. Before this, a sand collection operation had been ongoing on the east side of the Rock of Gibraltar. The sand from the slopes that was then beneath the water catchments was extracted and transported along a conveyor belt system to the road below for industrial use. The decaying skeleton of this conveyor system was visible from Sir Herbert Miles Road until very recently.

=== Discovery and rediscovery ===
In 1985, when workers began removing sand from above the water catchments, they discovered the entrance to a small cave. They recovered stone artifacts and bones until ordered to stop by George Palao of the Public Works Department. Palao gathered the collected items and arranged for the cave to be sealed according to notes found years later in a vault at the Gibraltar Museum. These finds were rediscovered in a bag in 1991 by Prof. Clive Finlayson, Director of the Gibraltar Museum. They included stone tools, made mainly of red jasper and many mammal bones including the almost complete skull of an ibex, a wild mountain goat. In the bag was Palao's report and thus was able to establish where the finds came from. The stone artifacts were of Mousterian tradition, i.e. Neanderthal. A museum collaborator, Julio Gafan, was aware of this find and introduced Prof. Finlayson to one of the former workers at the site who agreed to take them to the site where the artifacts had been recovered.

Writing about the rediscovery, Prof. Finlayson and his wife Dr. Geraldine Finlayson wrote: The area is divided into east and west sides by Rock, which are connected by a quarter-mile tunnel. There are some reservoirs around. The sides of the Rock have different scenes, with the eastern side warmer and better lit than the west. Sandy platform can be reached via the climbing cliff of about 700 steps, which was left over from the sand transported by workers here. Prof. Finlayson and Dr. Geraldine Finlayson mentioned

"The cave needed a name. No matter how much we debated we could not reach agreement. "

It is now known that Ibex Cave was a hunting station for the Neanderthals around 40,000 years ago, a site where they went to hunt the ibexes. Other fauna associated with the site included the now rare lammergeier or bearded vulture (Gypaetus barbatus).

== Protection ==
In 2018 this cave was included in the caves listed in the Heritage and Antiquities Act by the Government of Gibraltar, noting that the cave was a Palaeolithic site.

== See also ==
- Neanderthals of Gibraltar
- List of caves in Gibraltar
