= Robert Foley (academic) =

British anthropologist, archaeologist and academic

Robert Foley FBA
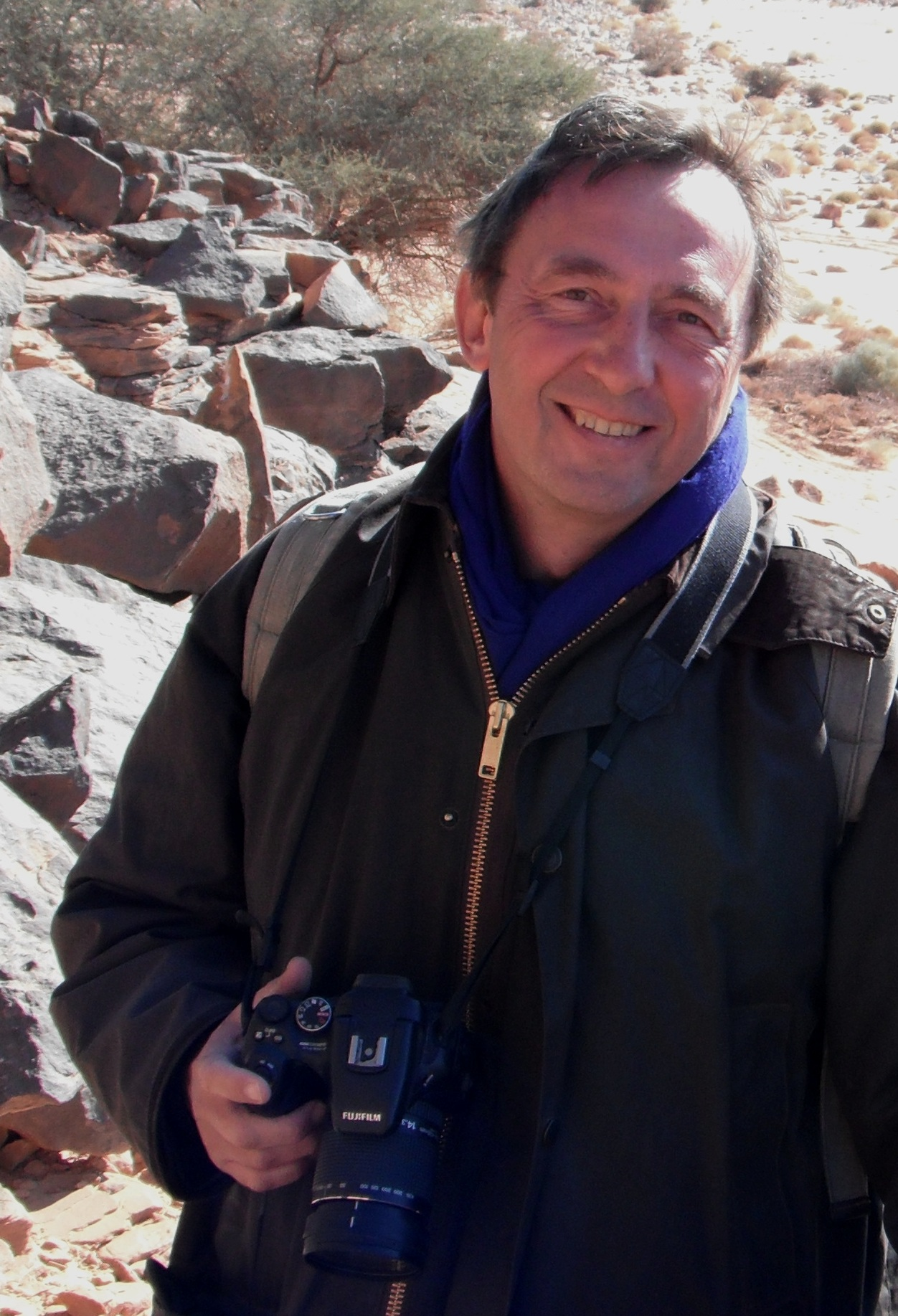
- Foley in 2011
- Born: Robert Andrew Foley; 18 March 1953 (age 73); Sussex, England
- Education: Peterhouse, Cambridge
- Spouse: Marta Mirazón Lahr
- Awards: Fellow of the British Academy (2007)
- Scientific career
- Fields: Human evolution Prehistoric archaeology
- Workplaces: University of Durham; University of Cambridge
- Thesis: Human palaeoecology: an analysis of regional artefact density in the Amboseli Basin, Southern Kenya (1975)

Robert Andrew Foley, FBA (born 18 March 1953) is a British anthropologist, archaeologist, and academic, specialising in human evolution. From 1977 to 1985, he was a lecturer in anthropology at the University of Durham. He has been a fellow of King's College, Cambridge, since 1987, and Leverhulme Professor of Human Evolution at the University of Cambridge since 2003.

== Early career ==
Foley was born on 18 March 1953 in Sussex, England, to Nelson and Jean Foley. He was educated at Ardingly College and Peterhouse, Cambridge where he earned an MA and PhD in archaeology. While an undergraduate at the University of Cambridge, he was a member of the University of Cambridge Archaeological Field Club (AFC).

== Academic career ==
From 1977 to 1985, Foley was a lecturer in anthropology at the University of Durham. He then returned to the University of Cambridge to take up a post in the Department of Biological Anthropology. From 1986 to 1998, he was a lecturer in Biological Anthropology. Since 1987, he has been a fellow of King's College, Cambridge. From 1998 to 2003, he was reader in evolutionary anthropology. He co-founded the Leverhulme Centre for Human Evolutionary Studies in 2001 with Marta Mirazón Lahr, and has been its director since its inception. The centre was designed to provide a home for the Duckworth Collection, and first class laboratories and facilities to support research in human evolution which integrated genetics, anthropology, and other fields. In 2003, he was appointed Leverhulme Professor of Human Evolution.

== Research ==
Foley has carried out research in many aspects of evolutionary theory, human evolution, prehistory and more recently human evolutionary genetics. His early work was on the Later Stone Age of East Africa, where he developed methods and ideas to study the landscape distributions of artefacts, giving rise to the sub-field of Off-Site Archaeology. In his work on human evolution he has emphasized an evolutionary ecological approach, seeing human adaptations as solutions to the problems faced by hominins in the environments in which they were living. This evolutionary research has also explored the relationship between climate and evolutionary change, the evolution of social behavior (finite social space model), and patterns of hominin diversity. This approach was summarized in two books – Another Unique Species, and Humans Before Humanity.

Since the 1990s, Foley has collaborated with Marta Mirazón Lahr on research relating to the evolution of modern humans and their diversity. Their work has argued for multiple dispersals of early humans out of Africa, and the use of the ‘southern route’. Their approach has emphasized the role of geographical factors in shaping human evolution, and a central role for dispersals as the process by which diversity evolves.

He has co-led expeditions and archaeological excavations with Mirazon Lahr in the Solomon Islands, the Central Sahara, and Kenya, particularly in the Turkana Basin. In Turkana, Foley and Mirazon Lahr study the late Quaternary record of human occupation in the basin, and have recently described a group of 10,000 year-old skeletons from the site of Nataruk that died as part of conflict between hunter-gatherer bands.

In the last decade, Foley has been involved in several aspects of evolutionary psychology and linguistics, exploring questions related to the evolution of human cognition, human language and its use as a mechanism is the evolution of society and social boundaries.

He has an h-index of 51 according to Google Scholar.

== Honours ==
In 2007, Foley was elected a Fellow of the British Academy (FBA).

== Selected publications ==
- Foley, R.A (2005), "Species diversity in human evolution: challenges and opportunities", Transactions of the Royal Society of South Africa, 60 (2): 67–72, Bibcode:2005TRSSA..60...67F, doi:10.1080/00359190509520479, S2CID 84189439
- Lewin, Roger; Foley, Robert (2003), Principles of Human Evolution (Second Edition), Blackwells, UK
- Foley, R.A (2001), "Adaptive radiations and dispersals in hominin evolutionary ecology", Evolutionary Anthropology, Supp 1: 32–37, doi:10.1002/evan.10051, S2CID 85326024
- Foley, Robert (1995), Humans before Humanity, Blackwells, UK
- Foley, R.A; Lee, P.C (1991), "Ecology and energies of encephalization in hominid evolution", Philosophical Transactions of the Royal Society B: Biological Sciences, 334 (1270): 223–232, doi:10.1098/rstb.1991.0111, PMID 1685580
- Foley, Robert; Dunbar, Robin (14 October 1989), "Beyond the bones of contention", New Scientist, 124 (1686): 21–25
