= Judge's Cave =

Cave in Gibraltar

- Interactive map of Judge's Cave
- Coordinates: 36°07′05″N 5°20′56″W
- Depth: 47 m (154 ft)
- Length: 250 m (820 ft)
- Elevation: 74 m (243 ft)
- Discovery: 1840s

Judge's Cave is a cave in the British Overseas Territory of Gibraltar. Human remains dated to the late prehistoric period have been unearthed in the cave. This Neolithic Shelter is protected by the law of Gibraltar.

== Discovery ==
Judge's Cave was discovered in the 1840s during the construction of a villa for James Cochrane who was Chief Justice of Gibraltar from 1841 to 1877. The cave was of some importance as it contained human remains and early visitors to the cave included Abbe Henri Breil, George Busk and local William Willoughby Cole Verner.

The human remains from this site have been described as being Neolithic and are currently held by the British Museum. This includes the skulls and thigh bones of two individuals. Gibraltarian cave enthusiast George Palao later visited the cave between January and April 1969 in which time he carried out excavations which produced various ceramic artifacts which are now kept at the Gibraltar Museum. The pottery remains excavated by Palao from this site are described as some of Gibraltar's most beautiful pieces.

Captain Gorham visited the cave during his time in Gibraltar alongside his team consisting of Lt. Anderson and Sgt. Mathews. Captain Gorham, best known for the discovery and naming of Gorham's Cave, was a keen explorer and left an inscription within Judge's cave marking his visit on 12 December 1906. There are areas of archaeological deposits which remain un-excavated and could very possibly yield more human remains. Judge's cave has recently been surveyed to the Grade 6 level of accuracy by a team of Spanish professional speleologists (Jose and Julio Aguilera) working alongside the Gibraltar Museum's team and another survey was carried out separately by the Gibraltar Museum's caving unit on 12 September 2012. The site has a total depth of 47 m (154 ft) below the current ground level and a total length of 250 m (820 ft). As the site is 74 m (243 ft) above sea level, its bottom chambers are only 27 meters above sea level. Judge's Cave is an extensive system based on various levels. The site may have other large chambers which are yet to be discovered. There is also a possibility that this cave could link up with other nearby cave systems.

== Today ==
In 2018 this cave was included in the caves listed in the Heritage and Antiquities Act by the Government of Gibraltar, noting that it was a Neolithic shelter.
