= Colossal Cave =

Colossal Cave may refer to:

- Colossal Cave (Arizona), cave system in Arizona
- Colossal Cavern, cave in Kentucky
- Colossal Cave Adventure, 1976 computer game based on Mammoth Cave National Park in Kentucky
  - Colossal Cave (video game), 2023 reimagining of the 1976 video game

== See also ==
- Mammoth Cave (disambiguation)
- Grotta Gigante
