= Hyaena Cave =

Cave in Gibraltar

- Location within Gibraltar
- Coordinates: 36°07′18″N 5°20′31″W

Hyaena Cave is a cave in the British Overseas Territory of Gibraltar. It forms part of the Gorham's Cave complex which is a UNESCO World Heritage Site. The cave was listed as a Palaeontological site and it was protected by law in 2018.

== Description ==
Hyaena Cave is one of four caves which together make up the Gorham's Cave complex which is a UNESCO World Heritage Site, the others being Vanguard, Gorham's and Bennett's Cave. Hyaena Cave, like the other three in the complex, has been gradually filled with sand that has been blown in through the entrance over thousands of years. These sands remain where they fall and over time they build up to remarkable depths. In the case of Vanguard Cave and Gorham's Cave the deposits are both more than seventeen metres deep. The sands record the environment from 15,000 to 55,000 years ago when the coastline was very different. In the past the sea was over 4.5 kilometres (2.8 miles) away from the caves whereas it is now very close.

== Today ==
In 2018 Hyaena cave was included in the caves listed in the Heritage and Antiquities Act by the Government of Gibraltar, noting it was a Palaeontological site.
