= Collin's Cave =

Cave in Gibraltar

Coordinates: 36°08′23″N 5°20′35″W

- Location within Gibraltar
- Location: above Catalan Bay
- Elevation: 420 feet
- Discovery: late 19th century
- Geology: limestone
- Difficulty: inaccessible

Collin's Cave is a cave in the British Overseas Territory of Gibraltar. It is located in the northeastern part of the Rock, between Reservoir Fissure and Middle Hill Cave. The cave is above Catalan Bay. It is one of the many caves in Gibraltar. It is believed to be archaeologically important and is listed in the government's Heritage and Antiquities Act 2018.

== Description ==
This is a natural cave, but it has archaeological value. Human remains, stone tools and artefacts have been found by the Gibraltar Scientific Society. It was occupied in Neolithic times. The bones found belonged to ibex boar, (probably) lynx, rabbit, ox, eagle or vulture and humans.

Many of these were displayed at Gibraltar Library in 1910 as at that time there was no Gibraltar Museum. They were arranged by Major Howell Jones R.A.. Major General Edward Ranulph Kenyon (1854-1937) realised that a cave at this height could still be a sea-cave and it was possible that the bones had been washed in by the sea.

The cave is over 400 feet above Catalan Bay on the east side of Gibraltar. It was surveyed in the 1960s and its entrance is described as "inaccessible".

== Discovery and namesake ==
It was rediscovered in the nineteenth century by Ernest Rokeby Collins. Collins was commissioned in 1892 and served with the 30th Foot (East Lancs Regiment) and he was promoted to captain in 1896. He would later be awarded a Distinguished Service Order in the Boer War and he became a Major. In 1918 he became a second lieutenant. He died in 1963.

Collin's interest in archaeology continued after he left Gibraltar. When he was in South Africa he collected stone tools which were sometimes found while digging trenches. He later donated his finds to the British Museum. He co-authored and published a 1915 paper with Reginald A. Smith of the British Museum on "Stone implements from South African gravels".

== Today ==
In 2018 this cave on Gibraltar's east cliffs was listed in the Heritage and Antiquities Act by the Government of Gibraltar.
