= Holy Boy's Cave =

Cave in Gibraltar

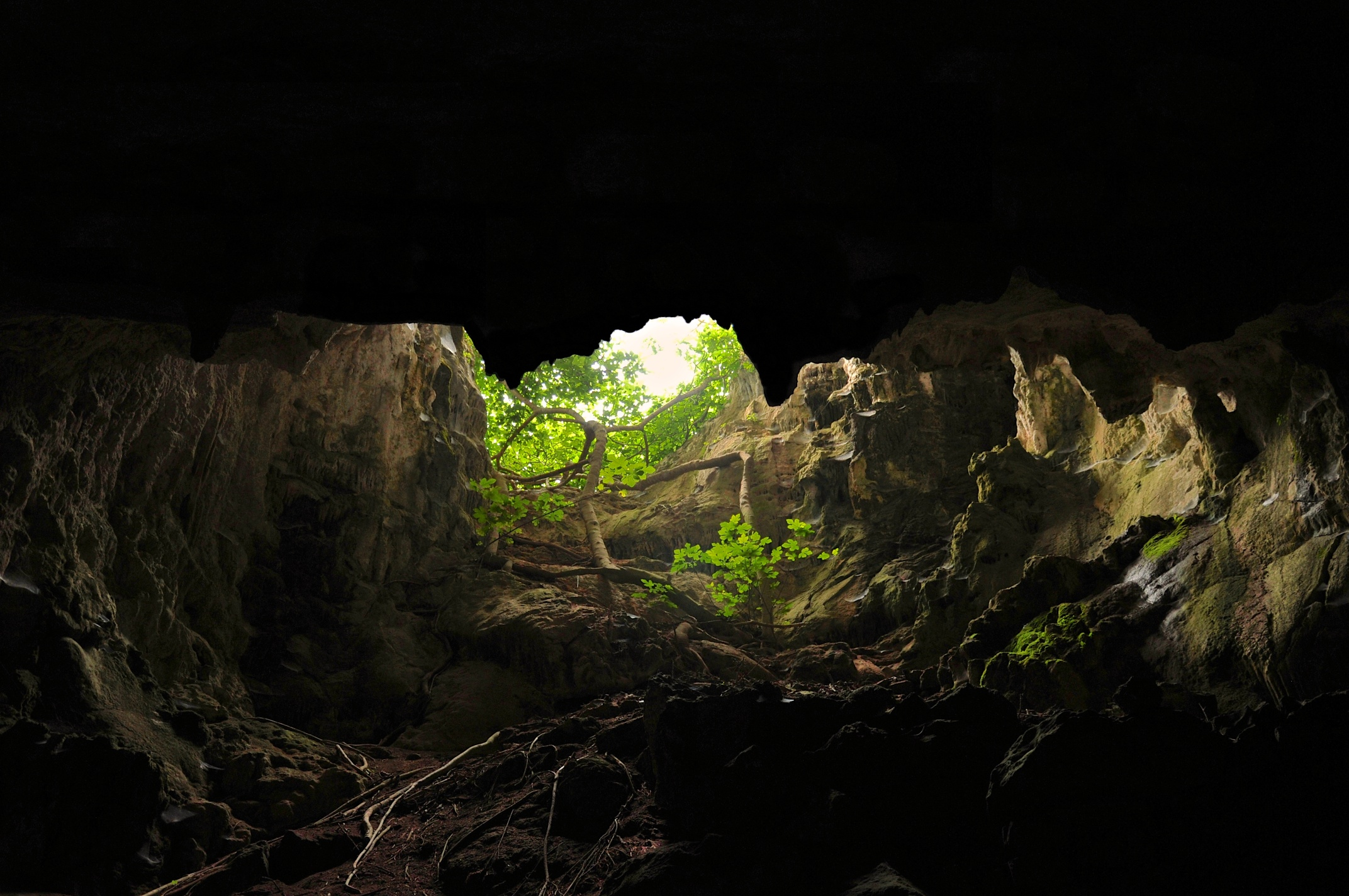

- Location within Gibraltar
- Location: East side of Gibraltar
- Coordinates: 36°07′59″N 5°20′41″W
- Elevation: 300m
- Discovery: 1711
- Geology: limestone
- Features: 1880 graffiti
- Cave survey: Heritage and Antiquities Act 2018

Holy Boy's Cave is a cave in the British Overseas Territory of Gibraltar. It is one of the largest of the many caves in Gibraltar and it is on the eastern side of the Rock, near Cave S. It is believed to be archaeologically important and is listed in the Heritage and Antiquities Act 2018.

== Description ==
The current shape of the Rock of Gibraltar is the result of nature and the work of the Royal Engineers. This cave was named after the nickname of the Royal Norfolk Regiment and the Royal East Anglian Regiment who were here in the 1880s. The Engineers would tunnel and smooth out any likely looking climbing surfaces. When they did this they would sometimes discover new caves like Holy Boys Cave. Inside this cave are marks on the wall recording the IX Regiment of Foot as being here. They had cap badges which the Spanish allegedly thought was the Virgin Mary but was clearly intended to be Britannia. Because of this confusion the regiment was called the Holy Boys and because of the graffiti this cave is called "Holy Boys".

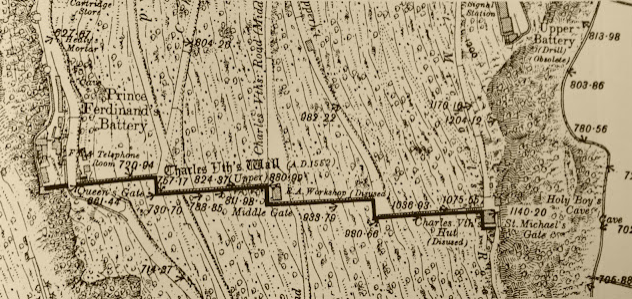
19th century Ordnance Survey map showing the tunnels of the Royal Engineers and Holy Boy's Cave on the eastern side of Gibraltar

The government of Gibraltar believe this cave to be archaeologically important. The History of the Royal Sappers and Miners recounts the cave. It was said to have been discovered in 1711 by some miners of the corps, while scarping the back of the Rock on the eastern side. Its entrance had been covered by undergrowth and they had to get onto all-fours as they climbed into the funnel-shaped crevices. Within the cave they discovered statactites, stalagmites, grottos and chambers. They also recount destroying "frostlike cushions of delicate finish, which, on being rudely touched, dissolved instantly into water." At the back of the hall they found bats and soil in two recesses but there was nothing growing in it. They described

"concretions, some as fleecy as snow, others as crisp as hoar-frost, and others of an opal hue as transparent as crystal. All was rich, beautiful, and sparkling. It was a marvel to adventurers, but unfit for habitation; yet, in later years, this hole of the mountain was possessed by a Spanish goat-herd, who reached his solitude by the same threadlike but dangerous tracks as his goats. There might the recluse have lived till his bones fell among the petrifaction, but he was at length expelled from its gloomy precincts on account of his contraband iniquities."

In 2018 this cave was listed in the Heritage and Antiquities Act by the Government of Gibraltar and in 2024 it was described on-line with photos and a video tour. Today the cave features a tree near its entrance with roots that travel though different chambers to the very bottom of the cave.
