= Leonora's Caves =

Limestone cave system in the British Overseas Territory of Gibraltar

- Location within Gibraltar
- Location: access via St. Michael's Cave
- Coordinates: 36°07′34″N 5°20′44″W
- Entrances: 1
- Entrances list: via St. Michael's Cave auditorium

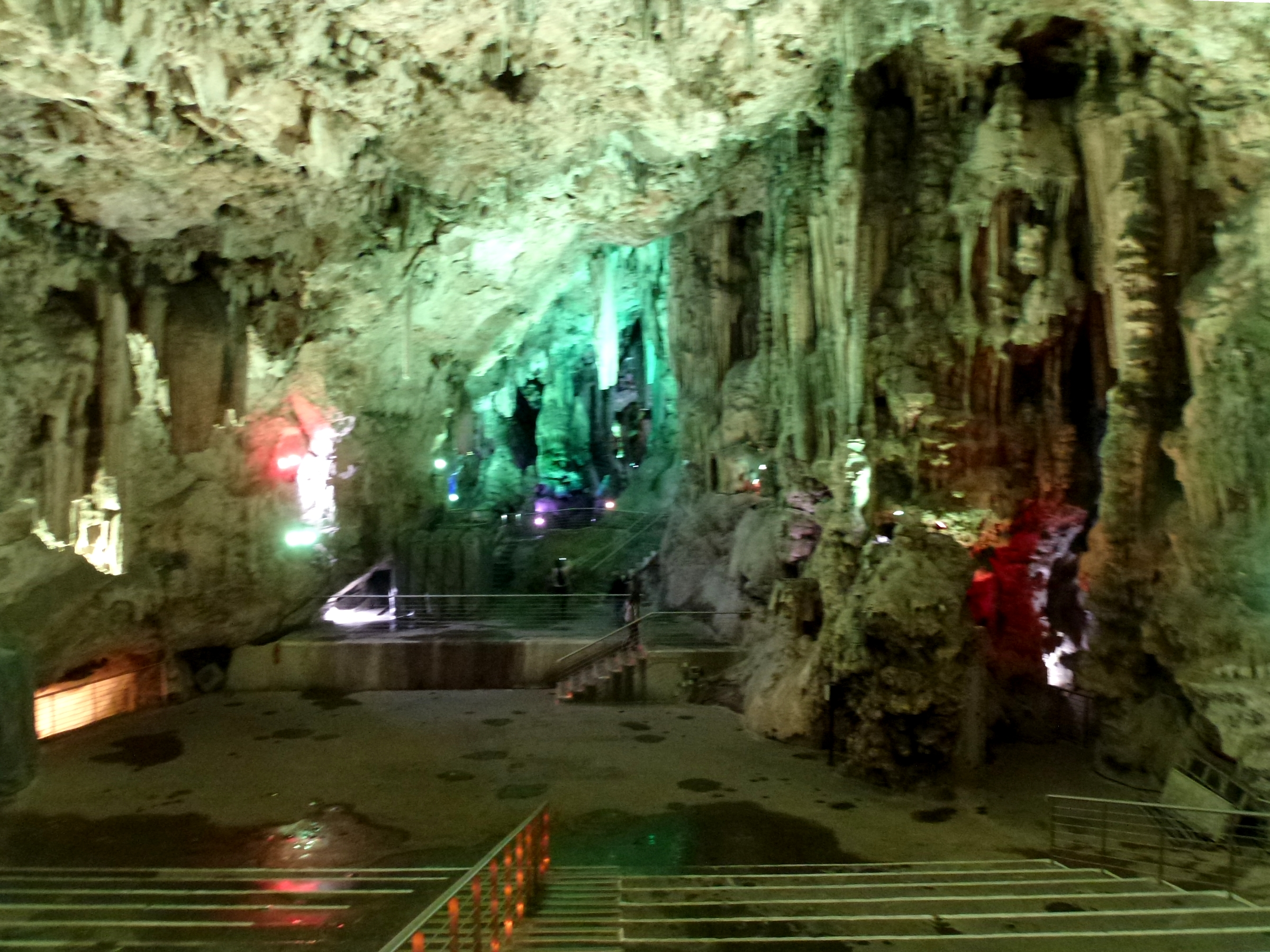
Saint Michael's Cave Gibraltar - panoramio.jpg

Leonora's Caves is a limestone cave system in the British Overseas Territory of Gibraltar. They are located within Old St. Michael's Cave.

== Description ==
The caves are accessed from within the St. Michael's Cave auditorium. Cavers must descend a scree slope to access the entrance which is marked by a sign engraved into the rock with the inscription "To Leonora's Caves 1867". However, it is not clear when the caves were discovered. The caves are difficult to enter and for that reason is largely unspoilt.

Leonora's Caves are a cave system within the popular show cave of St' Michael's Cave and it could be argued that they are an extension of St. Michael's Cave. Leonora's Caves were long believed to be a bottomless pit and it was here where the myth of an underwater cave passage communicating with North Africa emerged. It was said that through this passage, Gibraltar's Barbary macaques made their way to the Rock from Morocco. Leonora's is in fact not a bottomless pit, but is of substantial depth. Graffiti found on stalagmites and columns date back to 1801 and early reports mentioning "passages leading off St. Michaels Cave" suggest that the site was first explored in the 1700s by British troops; however, it was only until 1864 that Captain Frederick Brome explored this system extensively and realised its beauty. In 1867, he named this cave after his wife Leonora saying the site was "of unimaginable beauty". In 1914, the famous French prehistorian Abbe Breuil visited this cave in an attempt to research it properly and was the first to report seeing spiders, isopods, acaris, staphylindis and diptera. Bats were also reported to have been common in these caves although none are found now. In November 1959 George Palao, a Gibraltarian cave enthusiast and surveyor, head of the Gibraltar Cave Research Group also surveyed this cave producing some fine maps of the system. However, they did miss what is now called Lower Leonora's Cave discovered in 2012 by the Gibraltar Museum Caving Unit. Leonora's Caves just like St. Michael's Cave were used as a show cave in the 19th century. This passage by Lt. Col. G.J. Gilbard said:

"Ladies however need not be afraid of proceeding to the explorations of Leonora's Cave, from where, candles only having been used to light up the stalactites, pillar are undimmed by smoke, and the descent, although a little difficult is not too arduous an undertaking".

These trips for ladies would only be to the Main Chamber since attempting the Crawl and later the drop into the Bell Chamber in a long skirt or dress would have been quite dangerous. There are accounts of military personnel having visited the caves in their spare time in an attempt to finally find the passage to Africa and were "never seen again". Some believe though that they were simply trying to find a way of deserting and being lost in a cave and "never seen again" would be a good excuse. In 2012 the Gibraltar Museum Caving Unit carried out a systematic exploration of these caves. It took a few visits to understand the system properly, but discovered two access points to chambers which had not been previously mapped, drawn or described. This part of the system is much harder to navigate involving vertical rope pitches and steep narrow descents. The team has covered over 500 metres (1,600 ft) of new passages going deeper underground. Leonora's Cave has never been archaeologically examined completely. Some of the remains found at this site include an ox found in 1958. There is an abundance of breccia containing bone in some of the chambers.
