= Mediterranean Cave =

Cave in Gibraltar

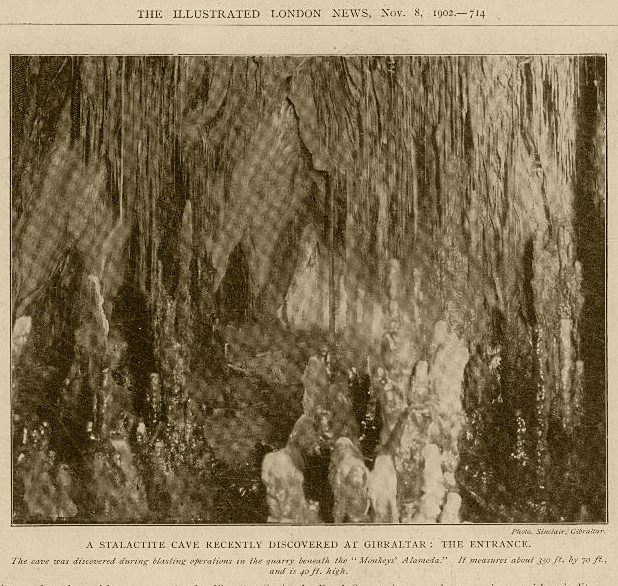
- The newly discovered Mediterranean Cave in The Illustrated London News in 1902

- Location within Gibraltar
- Location: South of Sandy Bay
- Coordinates: 36°07′44″N 5°20′32″W
- Length: 350
- Discovery: 1902 by Royal Engineers
- Geology: limestone
- Cave survey: Heritage and Antiquities Act

Mediterranean Cave is a cave in the British Overseas Territory of Gibraltar. The cave also has pillboxes and a fallout shelter nearby, these all being mentioned in the government's Heritage and Antiquities Act 2018.

== Location ==
Mediterranean Cave is south of Sandy Bay and on the eastern side of Gibraltar and on east of the Rock behind oil tanks (circa 1940).

== History ==
A cave with this name is recorded by Colonel E. R. Kenyon as having been occupied in 1779–1783 during the Great Siege of Gibraltar. However, it is not known which cave that was. The present Mediterranean Cave was discovered in August 1902 as the result of quarrying by the Admiralty. The cave was 40 feet high, 70 feet wide and 350 feet long. Because of its size, it was referred to as a "mammoth cave", but there was already a cave of that name on Gibraltar. A photo of the recently discovered cave's stalactites was included in The Illustrated London News that November, and the story was picked up in Australia. The cave was still being called "Mammoth" in those reports, but it was then called "Mediterranean Cave".

In 1910 a description of the best caves of Gibraltar singled out this "great cave" as "a most remarkably fine stalactite cave, containing stalactites and stalagmites of an infinite variety of form and size."

It became an Admiralty Distillery in 1942.

The cave is considered significant by the Government of Gibraltar and is specifically listed in the Heritage and Antiquities Act passed in 2018. The act notes the pillboxes and the fallout shelter by the cave, and these are also included in the government's listing.

== See also ==
- List of caves in Gibraltar
