= Devil's Fall Cave =

Cave in Gibraltar

Devil's Fall
- Location within Gibraltar
- Coordinates: 36°07′05.1″N 5°21′00.9″W
- Access: dangerous
- Cave survey: Heritage and Antiquities Act 2018

Devil's Fall is a cave in the British Overseas Territory of Gibraltar. It was a prehistoric shelter and is listed and protected by the Heritage and Antiquities Act 2018.

== Description ==
This cave, which is actually four caves, is in the cliff face between Camp Bay and Little Bay. They are known as Devil's Fall Cave, Devil's Fall (North), Devil's Fall (West-Upper) also known as Crack Cave and Devil's Fall (West-Lower). The location is considered dangerous. In the 1950s there were a large number of cannonballs found in the cave. It is surmised that these had rolled down the slopes into the cave during the many times that Gibraltar was under siege.

The Devil's Fall cave is one of few identified as being of particular archaeological interest. The cave is a Class A listed building as designated by the Government of Gibraltar's Gibraltar Heritage Trust Act of 1989. The importance of the cave, and its condition, led to the rejection of a nearby planning application in 2013.

In 2018 the status of the cave was confirmed in the Heritage and Antiquities Act by the Government of Gibraltar noting that it was a prehistoric shelter.

== See also ==
- List of caves in Gibraltar
