= Mammoth Cave (disambiguation) =

Mammoth Cave is a national park and cave system in Kentucky.

Mammoth Cave may also refer to:

- Mammoth Cave (Gibraltar)
- Mammoth Cave (Western Australia)
- California Caverns, originally called Mammoth Cave
- Mammoth Cave (Utah)

== See also ==
- Mammoth Cave Baptist Church and Cemetery, Kentucky
- Mammoth Cave Railroad, Kentucky
- Mammoth Cave Parkway, Kentucky
