= Cave S =

Limestone cave in Gibraltar

Coordinates: 36°07′57″N 5°20′41″W

- Sewell's Cave
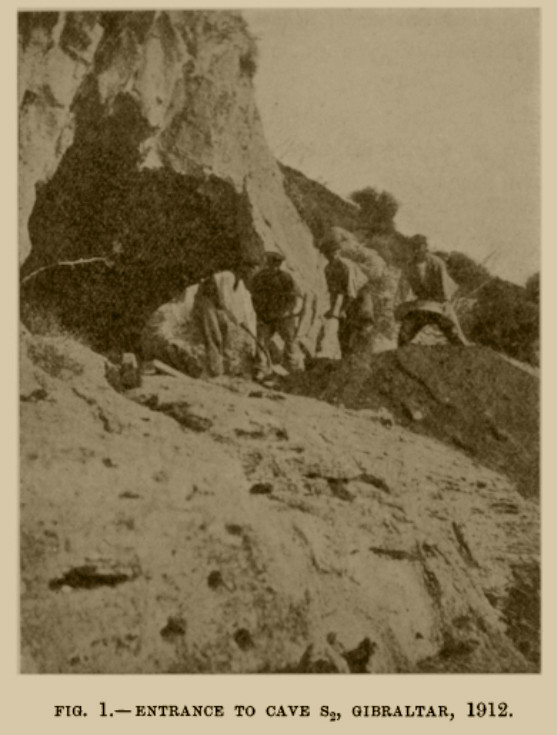
- Entrance to Cave S or Sewell's Cave in Gibraltar in 1912

- Location within Gibraltar
- Location: Rock of Gibraltar
- Discovery: Captain Sewell
- Geology: Limestone
- Entrances: 1
- Show cave opened: No

Cave S or Sewell's Cave is a limestone cave in the British Overseas Territory of Gibraltar. It is located on the eastern side of the Rock of Gibraltar, near Holy Boy's Cave. Prehistoric human remains were found in the cave in 1910, and the cave is listed by the Government of Gibraltar as a Palaeolithic site.

== Description ==
Captain Sewell discovered what is now known as Cave S or Sewell's Cave. Sewell also gave his name to Sewell's Fig Tree Caves which are now known as Goat's Hair Twin Caves. Sewell in time became a Lieutenant Colonel.

Sir Charles Warren carried out a survey of Gibraltar in 1864 which recorded the cave as being 800 feet (240 m) above sea level and 30 feet (9.1 m) below the Great Gibraltar Sand Dune that was once used to capture rainwater which served as Gibraltar's main water supply. The cave is about 1 mile (1.6 km) from the north end of the Rock and opens on the east face of the Rock just above Holy Boy's Cave. The cave provides evidence of marine life indicating that despite its current altitude it was once a sea cave. This is not the only evidence of rising and falling sea levels in Gibraltar which have historically varied greatly.

Wynfrid Duckworth described the cave's floor as falling in height towards the entrance and it was covered in a soil that had the consistency of snuff in 1910. Despite not finding any bats he thought that the snuff-like material was vegetable matter and bat guano. Various human artifacts such as pottery, stone implements and other stone objects, a shell armlet, perforated cyprcea, charcoal, burnt bone and broken shellfish and a wide variety of bird remains and mammalian fauna have been found in the cave. The human bones were thought to come from one male skull-less skeleton which appeared to have notably thick bones.

== Today ==
In 2018 this cave was listed in the Heritage and Antiquities Act by the Government of Gibraltar noting that it was a Palaeolithic site.
