= Painter's Cave =

Cave in Gibraltar

- Interactive map of Painter's Cave
- Coordinates: 36°07′15″N 5°20′58″W

Painter's Cave is a cave in the British Overseas Territory of Gibraltar.

It is located close to Royal Naval Hospital. It is a narrow cave, approximately 5–6 meters long. It has an entrance about 3 meters high. The cave has old graffiti from 1877 when it was discovered. It has two floors loosely connected and various rock formations.

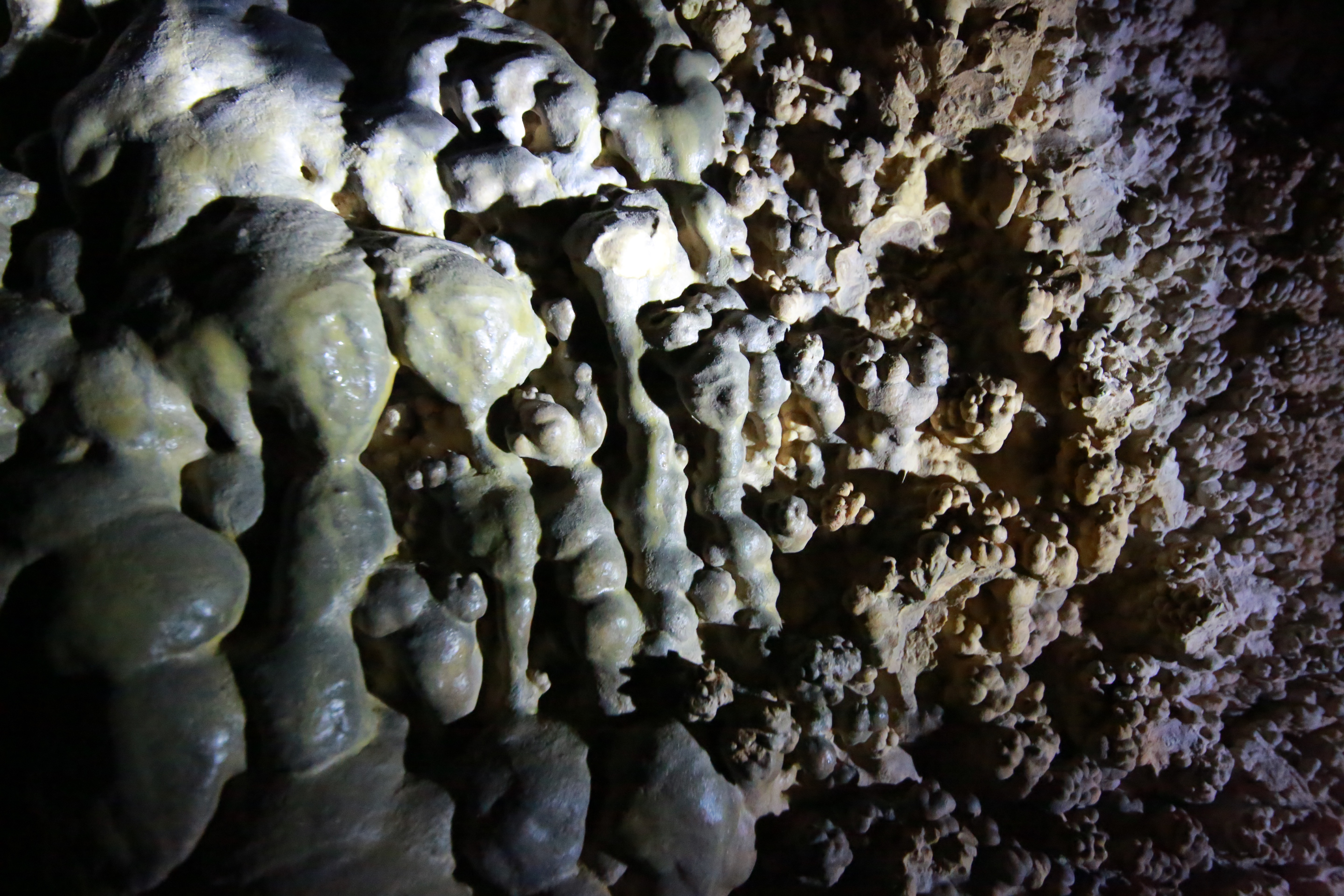
Rock formations in Painter's Cave. Close up.

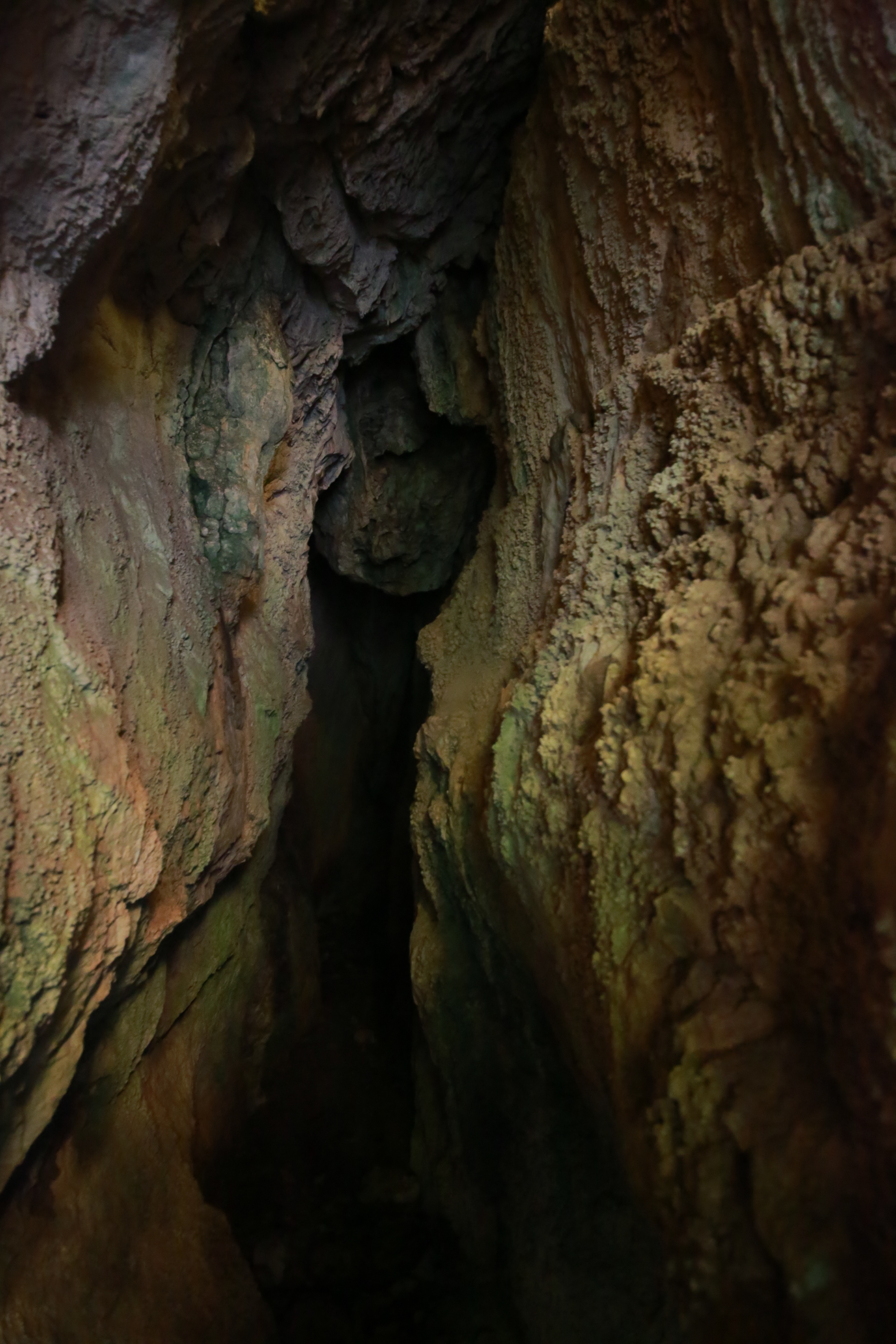

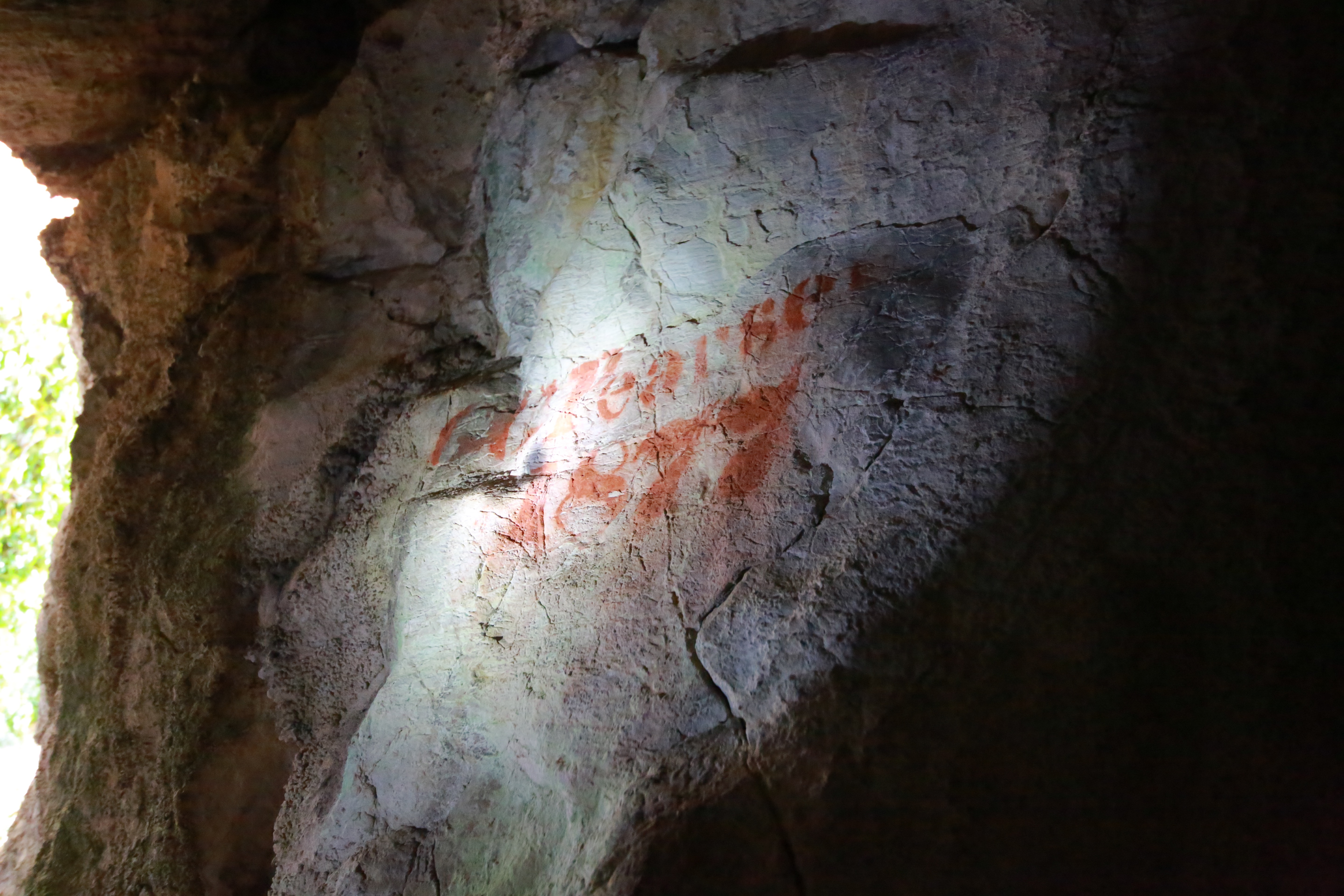
Graffiti from 1877 in Painter's Cave.

== See also ==
- List of caves in Gibraltar
