= AROW Street =

Tunnel in Gibraltar

Coordinates: 36°07′17″N 5°20′36″W

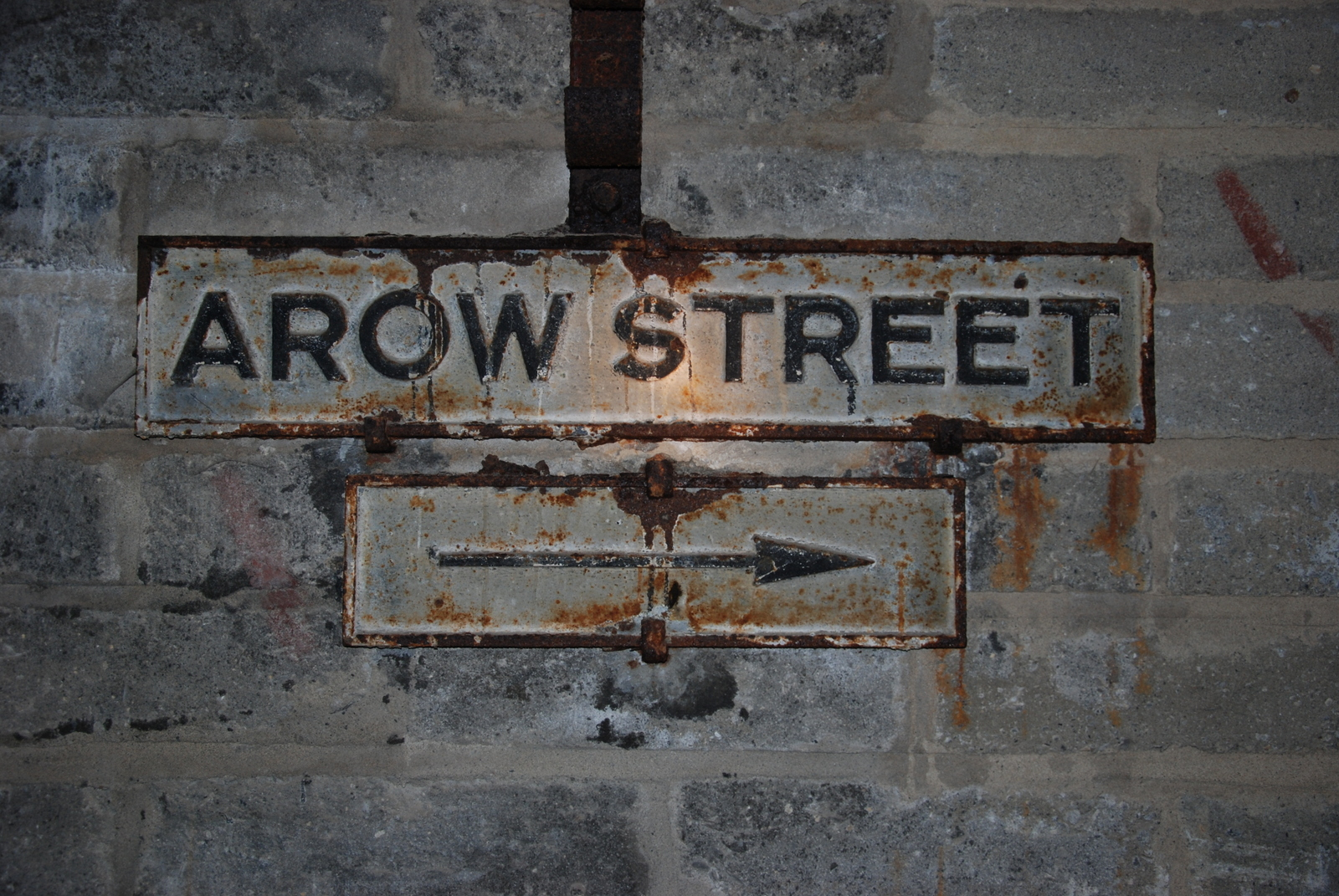
- AROW Street tunnel, Gibraltar
- Interactive map of AROW Street

Overview
- Location: Gibraltar
- Start: Monkey's Cave

Operation
- Work began: 1942
- Constructed: limestone
- Owner: Government of Gibraltar

Technical
- Tunnel clearance: lorry

AROW Street is a tunnel in Gibraltar that was excavated in 1942. The tunnel, like Gibraltar's Great North Road, was large enough to take Army ammunition trucks.

== Description ==
The tunnel was planned in January 1942 and was designed to be large enough to accept Army trucks carrying ammunition. Along the tunnel were chambers intended to contain stores of ammunition and supplies. The tunnel is entirely within the Rock of Gibraltar behind the east side which overlooks the Mediterranean.

The name of the tunnel was based on the initials of the man in charge of the tunnel, Lt Col Arthur Robert Owen Williams (1905–1989) of 178 Tunnelling Company, Royal Engineers. He had trained as a miner in South Africa and was in charge of tunnelling operations in Gibraltar during World War II. When he left the army he was also given an OBE. Williams also gave his name to a road tunnel on the east side of the Rock called Williams Way.

One entrance during the Second World War was via Monkey's Cave. Soldiers in the Royal Electrical & Mechanical Engineers would enter AROW Street through Monkey's Cave and make their way to their instrument workshop located in the Rock. The engineers would get to their cave along this internal road. Their cave had windows which allowed them to work with natural light and they could see views of the Straits of Gibraltar.
