= Mammoth Cave (Gibraltar) =

Cave in Gibraltar

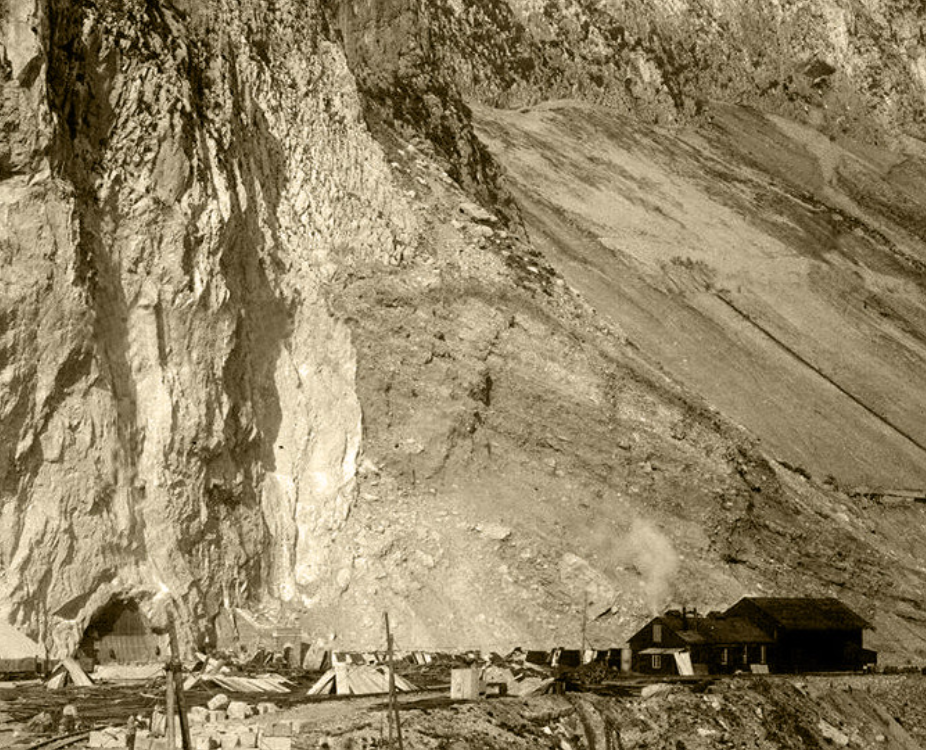
- Mediterranean Cave at left and Mammoth Cave (at top right) entrances in 1902 during quarrying in Gibraltar

Mammoth Cave or Signal Station Cave is in the British Overseas Territory of Gibraltar. It is one of Gibraltar's largest caves and a Neolithic site. It is listed in the Heritage and Antiquities Act 2018.

== History ==
The cave had already been named when another "Mammoth Cave" was discovered in August 1902. That cave was later called Mediterranean Cave, but for several months it was also being called Mammoth in London and Australia.

This cave had always been called the Mammoth Cave or Signal Station Cave. It is one of Gibraltar's largest caves and was below the signal station. It is also a Neolithic site and an important asset to Gibraltar. It is specifically listed in the Heritage and Antiquities Act which the Government of Gibraltar passed in 2018.
