= Marta Mirazón Lahr =

British-Argentine palaeoanthropologist

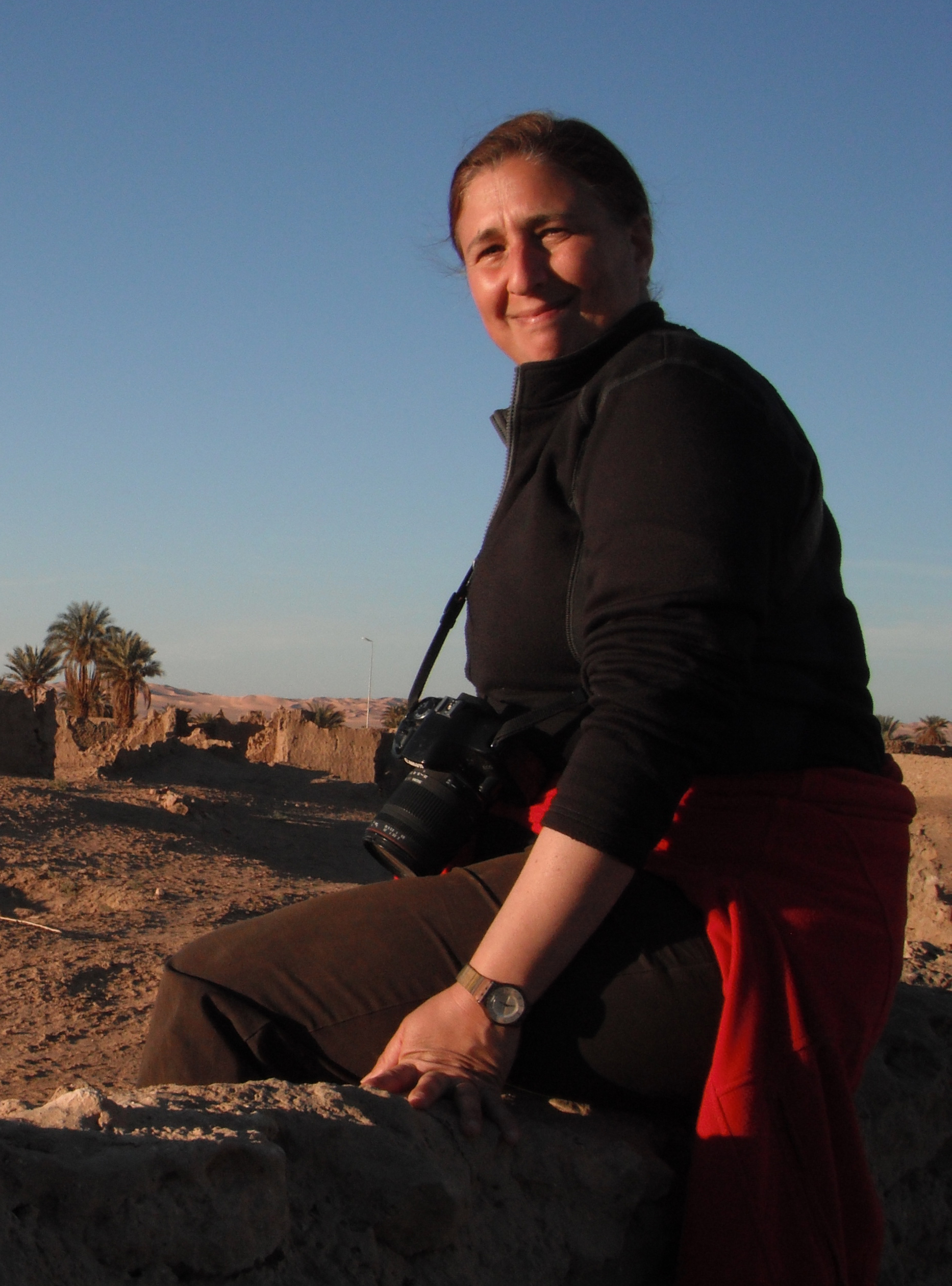
- Born: 1965 (age 60–61); Buenos Aires, Argentina
- Education: University of São Paulo; University of Cambridge
- Occupation: Evolutionary Biologist
- Partner: Robert Foley (academic)

Marta Mirazón Lahr (born 1965) is a palaeoanthropologist and director of the Duckworth Laboratory at the University of Cambridge.

== Academic career ==
Born in Buenos Aires, Argentina, Mirazon Lahr graduated in biology from the University of São Paulo, Brazil. She later earned a master's and PhD in biological anthropology from the University of Cambridge, following which she was elected to a junior research fellowship at Clare College. She was then an assistant professor at the Department of Biology of University of São Paulo (1995–98), before returning to Cambridge in 1999 as a lecturer in biological anthropology and fellow of Clare College. Mirazon Lahr was promoted to University Reader in Human Evolutionary Biology in 2005.

In 2001 Mirazon Lahr, with co-founder and husband Robert Foley, established the Leverhulme Centre for Human Evolutionary Studies (LCHES) at the University of Cambridge, with funding from the Wellcome Trust and the Leverhulme Trust. The Centre was designed to provide a home for the Duckworth Collection, and up-to-date laboratories and facilities to support research in human evolution which integrated genetics, anthropology, and other fields.

Mirazon Lahr was awarded the Philip Leverhulme Prize in 2004.

== Research ==
Lahr's research is in human evolution, and ranges across human and hominin morphology, prehistory and genetics. Her early work provided a test of the Multiregional Hypothesis of modern humans origins, and underlined much of the argument against models of regional continuity in traits between archaic and modern humans. This research expanded into a fuller consideration of the origins of modern human diversity, published as a book in 1996 - The Evolution of Human Diversity - by Cambridge University Press. Her subsequent research continues to explore human diversity from a number of different perspectives and methodological approaches, and includes archaeology, palaeobiology, genomics and human biology.

She and Robert Foley were the first to propose a 'southern route' for humans out of Africa, and for human diversity to be the product of multiple dispersals as well as local adaptation. She has led field projects in the Amazon, the Solomon Islands, India, the Central Sahara and Kenya, the last two focusing on issues to do with the origins and dispersals of modern humans in Africa.

Mirazon Lahr is currently the director of the IN-AFRICA Project, an Advanced Investigator Award from the European Research Council (ERC) to examine the role of east Africa in modern human origins. As part of the IN-AFRICA Project, she has led the excavations at the site of Nataruk in Turkana, Kenya, establishing the existence of prehistoric warfare among nomadic hunter-gatherers 10,000 years ago.

She was interviewed alongside Richard and Meave Leakey as part of the documentary 'Bones of Turkana', a National Geographic Special about palaeoanthropology and human evolution in the Turkana Basin, Kenya.

== Selected publications ==
- Lahr, M.M. (1992), The origins of modern humans: A test of the Multiregional Hypothesis, Cambridge University Press, UK
- Lahr, M. M. & Foley, R. A. (2003), "On stony ground: Lithic technology, human evolution, and the emergence of culture", Evolutionary Anthropology, 12 (3): 109–122, doi:10.1002/evan.10108, S2CID 32857294
- Bateson, P., Barker, D., Clutton-Brock, T., Deb, D., D'Udine, B., Foley, R. A., Gluckman, P., Godfrey, K., Kirkwood, T., Lahr, M.M., McNamara, J., Metcalfe, N. B., Monaghan, P., Spencer, G., & Sultan, S. E. (2004), "Developmental plasticity and human health", Nature, 430 (6998): 419–421, Bibcode:2004Natur.430..419B, doi:10.1038/nature02725, PMID 15269759, S2CID 4374045
- Field, J. S. & Lahr, M. M. (2006), "Assessment of the Southern Dispersal: GIS-Based Analyses of Potential Routes at Oxygen Isotopic Stage 4", Journal of World Prehistory, 19 (1): 1–45, doi:10.1007/s10963-005-9000-6, S2CID 55130757
- Migliano, A.B.; Vinicius, L. (December 2007). "Mirazón Lahr, M. (2007) Life-history trade-offs explain the evolution of human pygmies". Proceedings of the National Academy of Sciences of the United States of America. 104 (51): 20216–20219. doi:10.1073/pnas.0708024105. PMC 2154411. PMID 18077366.
- Petraglia, M.; Korisettar, R.; Boivin, N.; Clarkson, C.; Ditchfield, P.; Jones, S.; Koshy, J. (July 2007). "Lahr, M.M.; Oppenheimer, C.; Pyle, D.; Roberts, R.; Schwenninger, J.-L.; Arnold, L. & White, K. (2007) Middle Paleolithic assemblages from the Indian subcontinent before and after the Toba super-eruption". Science. 317 (5834): 114–116. Bibcode:2007Sci...317..114P. doi:10.1126/science.1141564. hdl:10072/412769. PMID 17615356. S2CID 20380351.
- Mirazón Lahr, M.; Foley, R.; Armitage, S.; Barton, H.; Crivellaro, F.; Drake, N.; Hounslow, M.; Maher, L.; Mattingly, D.; Salem, M.; Stock, J. & White, K. (2008) DMP III: Pleistocene and Holocene palaeoenvironments and prehistoric occupation of Fazzan, Libyan Sahara. Libyan Studies 39: 263-294.
- Petraglia, M.; Clarkson, C.; Boivin, N.; Haslam, M.; Korisettar, R.; Chaubey, G.; Ditchfield, P.; Fuller, D.; James, H.; Jones, S.; Kivisild, T.; Koshy, J. (2009). "Mirazon Lahr, M.; Metspalu, M.; Roberts, R. & Arnold, L. (2009) Population increase and environmental deterioration correspond with microlithic innovations in South Asia ca. 35,000 years ago" (PDF). Proceedings of the National Academy of Sciences. 106 (30): 12261–12266. Bibcode:2009PNAS..10612261P. doi:10.1073/pnas.0810842106. PMC 2718386. PMID 19620737.
- Mirazon Lahr, M. (2010), "Saharan Corridors and their role in the Evolutionary Geography of 'Out of Africa I'", in Fleagle, J.G.; et al. (eds.), Out of Africa I, Vertebrate Paleobiology and Paleoanthropology, pp. 27–46
- Rasmussen, M.; Guo, X.; Wang, Y.; Lohmueller, K.E.; Rasmussen, S.; Albrechtsen, A.; Skotte, L.; Lindgreen, S.; Metspalu, M.; Jombart, T.; Kivisild, T.; Zhai, W.; Eriksson, A.; Manica, A.; Orlando, L.; De La Vega, F.; Tridico, S.; Metspalu, E.; Nielsen, K.; Ávila-Arcos, M.C.; Moreno-Mayar, J.V.; Muller, C.; Dortch, J.; Gilbert, M.T.P.; Lund, O.; Wesolowska, A.; Karmin, M.; Weinert, L.A.; Wang, B.; Li, J.; Tai, S.; Xiao, F.; Haninara, T.; van Driem, G.; Jha, A.R.; Ricaut, F.-X.; de Knijff, P.; Migliano, A.B.; Gallego-Romero, I.; Kristiansen, K.; Lambert, D.M.; Brunak, S.; Forster, P.; Brinkmann, B.; Nehlich, O.; Bunce, M.; Richards, M.; Gupta, R.; Bustamante, C.; Krogh, A.; Foley, R.A. (2011). "Lahr, M.M.; Balloux, F.; Sicheritz-Pontén, T.; Villems, R.; Nielsen, R.; Jun, W. & Willerslev, E. (2011) Aboriginal Australian Genome Obtained from Hundred-Year-Old Lock of Hair Reveals Separate Human Dispersals into Asia". Science. 334 (6052): 94–98. Bibcode:2011Sci...334...94R. doi:10.1126/science.1211177. PMC 3991479. PMID 21940856.
- Foley, R.A. (2011). "Mirazón Lahr, M. (2011) The evolution of the diversity of cultures". Philosophical Transactions of the Royal Society of London B. 366 (1567): 1080–1089. doi:10.1098/rstb.2010.0370. PMC 3049104. PMID 21357230.
- Mirazon Lahr, M. (2013) Genetic and fossil evidence for modern human origins. In: P. Mitchell & P. Lane (Eds.). Oxford Handbook of African Archaeology, pp 325–340. Oxford: OUP.
- Foley, R. (2014). "Mirazon Lahr, M. (2014) The role of 'the aquatic' in human evolution: constraining the aquatic ape hypothesis". Evolutionary Anthropology. 23 (2): 56–59. doi:10.1002/evan.21405. PMID 24753345. S2CID 849419.
- Raghavan, Maanasa; DeGiorgio, Michael; Albrechtsen, Anders; Moltke, Ida; Skoglund, Pontus; Korneliussen, Thorfinn S.; Grønnow, Bjarne; Appelt, Martin; Gulløv, Hans Christian; Friesen, T. Max; Fitzhugh, William; Malmström, Helena; Rasmussen, Simon; Olsen, Jesper; Melchior, Linea; Fuller, Benjamin T.; Fahrni, Simon M.; Stafford, Thomas; Grimes, Vaughan; Renouf, M. A. Priscilla; Cybulski, Jerome; Lynnerup, Niels; Mirazon Lahr, Marta; Britton, Kate; Knecht, Rick; Arneborg, Jette; Metspalu, Mait; Cornejo, Omar E.; Malaspinas, Anna-Sapfo; Wang, Yong; Rasmussen, Morten; Raghavan, Vibha; Hansen, Thomas V. O.; Khusnutdinova, Elza; Pierre, Tracey; Dneprovsky, Kirill; Andreasen, Claus; Lange, Hans; Hayes, M. Geoffrey; Coltrain, Joan; Spitsyn, Victor A.; Götherström, Anders; Orlando, Ludovic; Kivisild, Toomas; Villems, Richard; Crawford, Michael H.; Nielsen, Finn C.; Dissing, Jørgen; Heinemeier, Jan; Meldgaard, Morten; Bustamante, Carlos; O'Rourke, Dennis H.; Jakobsson, Mattias; Gilbert, M. Thomas P.; Nielsen, Rasmus; Willerslev, Eske (29 August 2014). "The genetic prehistory of the New World Arctic". Science. 345 (6200). doi:10.1126/science.1255832. PMID 25170159. S2CID 353853.
- Seguin-Orlando, A; Korneliussen, TS; Sikora, M; Malaspinas, A-S; Manica, A; Moltke, I; Albrechtsen, A; Ko, A; Margaryan, A; Moiseyev, V; Goebel, T; Westaway, M; Lambert, D; Khartanovich, V; Wall, JD; Nigst, PR; Foley, RA (2014). "Mirazon Lahr M, Nielsen R, Orlando L & Willerslev E (2014) Genomic structure in Europeans dating back at least 36,200 years". Science. 346 (6213): 1113–1118. Bibcode:2014Sci...346.1113S. doi:10.1126/science.aaa0114. PMID 25378462. S2CID 206632421.
- Foley, RA (2015). "Mirazon Lahr M (2015) Lithic landscapes: Early human impact from stone tool production on the Central Saharan environment". PLOS ONE. 10 (3) e0116482. doi:10.1371/journal.pone.0116482. PMC 4356577. PMID 25760999.
- Rasmussen, S; Allentoft, ME; Nielsen, K; Orlando, L; Sikora, M; Sjögren, K-G; Pedersen, AG; Van Dam, A; Kapel, CMO; Nielsen, HB; Brunak, S; Avetisyan, P; Epimakhov, A; Gnuni, A; Kriiska, A; Lasak, I; Metspalu, M; Moiseyev, V; Gromov, A; Pokutta, D; Saag, L; Varul, L; Yepiskoposyan, L; Sicheritz-Pontén, T; Foley, RA (2015). "Mirazón Lahr, M, Nielsen R, Kristiansen K & Willerslev E (2015) Early divergent strains of Yersinia pestis in Eurasia five thousand years ago". Cell. 163 (3): 571–582. doi:10.1016/j.cell.2015.10.009. PMC 4644222. PMID 26496604.
- Mirazon Lahr, M.; et al. (2016). "Inter-group violence among early Holocene hunter-gatherers of West Turkana, Kenya". Nature. 529 (7586): 394–398. Bibcode:2016Natur.529..394L. doi:10.1038/nature16477. PMID 26791728. S2CID 4462435.
