= Williams Way, Gibraltar =

Williams Way
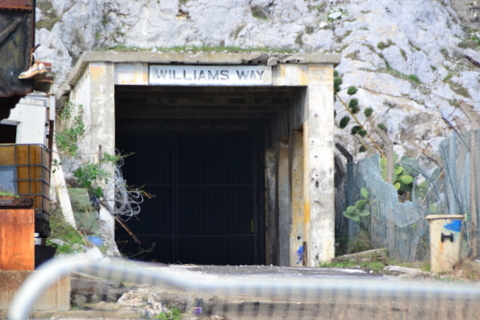
- Entrance to Williams Way
- Interactive map of Williams Way

Overview
- Location: Gibraltar
- Coordinates: 36.14333°N 5.34083°W
- Status: Closed
- Start: Catalan Bay Road
- End: Sir Herbert Miles Road

Operation
- Work began: 1942
- Constructed: limestone
- Owner: Government of Gibraltar

Williams Way is a tunnel through the eastern part of the Rock of Gibraltar.

== Description ==
It is one of two tunnels in Gibraltar named after Lt Col A R O Williams, of 178 Tunnelling Company, Royal Engineers. Arthur Robert Owen Williams (1905-1989) was known as "ARO". He had trained as a miner in South Africa and was in charge of tunnelling operation in Gibraltar during World War II. When he left the army he was also given an OBE. Williams also gave his name to Arow Street which is a tunnel entirely inside the rock.

The tunnel's entrance starts at Catalan Bay Road and exits at Sir Herbert Miles Road. It was built in 1942 to bypass a landslide which had been triggered by a large detonation of explosives during quarrying operations. The landslide completely blocked off the road to Catalan Bay Village. This tunnel also provides access to MacFarlane's Gallery and during 1944/1945 was used to provide an entrance to a fuel storage area known as Project 'C'.

On 1 October 2012 a fire occurred inside the tunnel in a disused control room which took two hours to extinguish.

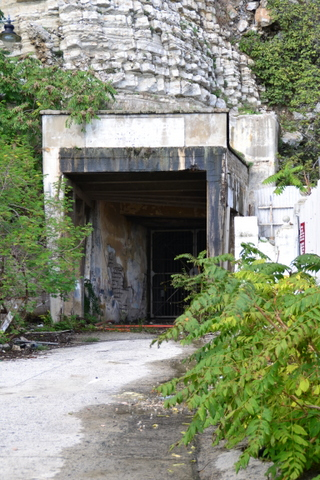
Tunnel Exit at Catalan Bay
