= Pete's Paradise Cave =

Cave in Gibraltar

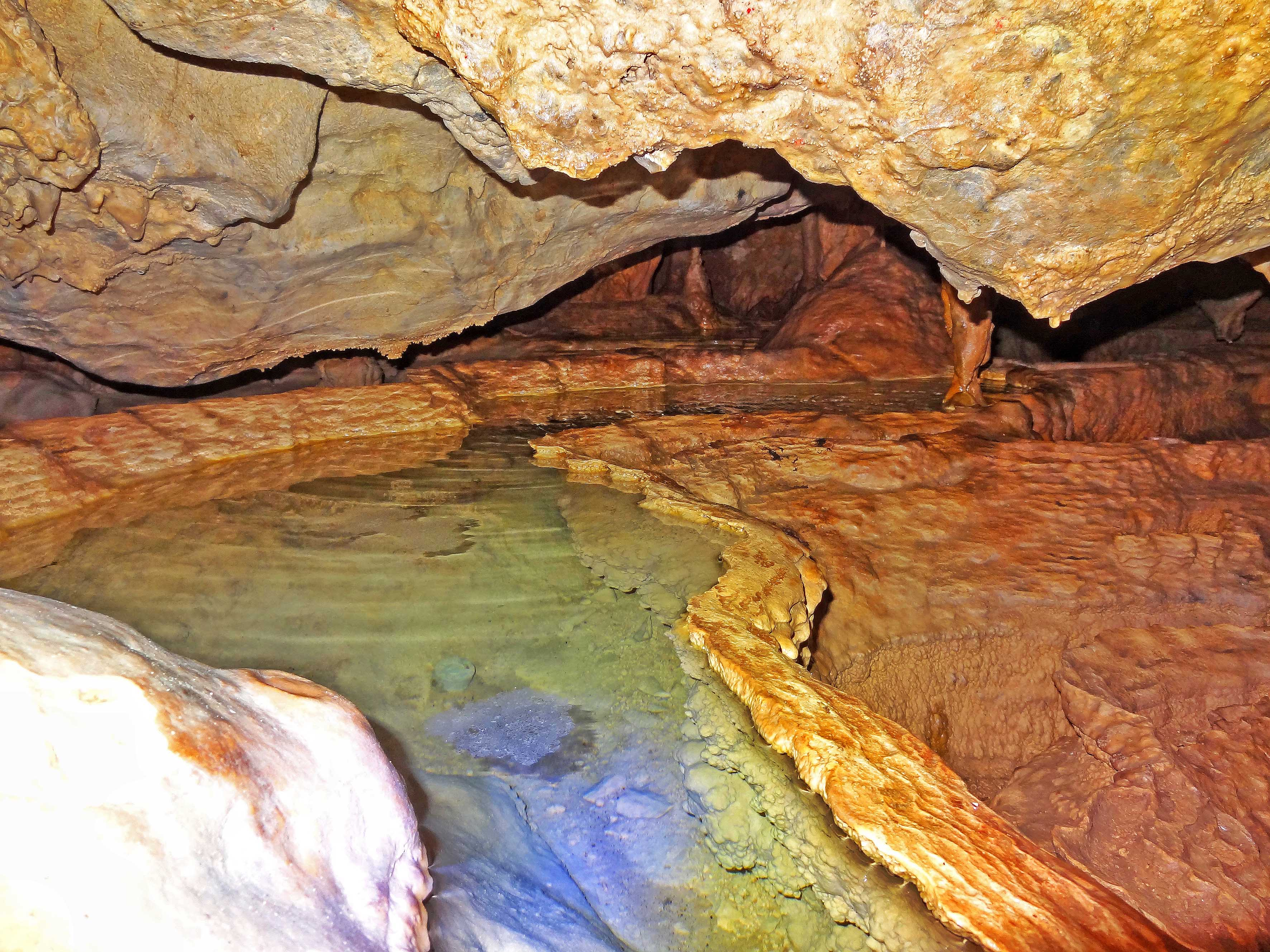

- Location within Gibraltar
- Location: below Queen's Road, Gibraltar
- Coordinates: 36°8′3.9″N 5°20′58.2″W
- Entrances: 1
- Features: 4 chambers

Pete's Paradise Cave is a cave in the British Overseas Territory of Gibraltar. Explored in the 1960s and 1970s by a team led by George Palao, four skeletons have been unearthed in the cave, two of which were female skeletons with crushed skulls.

== Description ==
The cave is found sixteen metres below Queens Road. The entrance is a metre high and six metres wide and the floor on entry is made of earth. This was named Nun's chamber. The next chamber is called Rimstone Chamber because of the rimstone pools which fall away at different levels. From here it is possible to crawl through a tight hole for eight metres to come out at what was called Pearl's Chamber because of the presence of cave pearls. These are formed around grains of sand and they become coated with calcium carbonate which can grow in time to be 3 cm in diameter. A moving body of water is required to keep these pearls turning whilst they form. The last, and described as the best, chamber is the Hall of Pillars. This chamber contains another perfect rimstone. This is one of three in this cave and only one of three in the whole of Gibraltar.

== Discovery and archaeology ==
Pete’s Paradise is a unique structure with crystal-clear rim stone pools and a maze-like network of crawls and chambers. This cave was discovered by the Gibraltar Cave Research Group on 26 February 1966 by members who were abseiling down the rock. The cave was named after Peter Mann from the research group. The Gibraltar Cave Research Group then carried out grade 6 surveys and an excavation of the cave later in 1966 and a structure and site plan was produced. During excavation in 1966 numerous prehistoric artefacts were found such as shards of Neolithic pottery, bones and stone tools. Bones were found at different levels and strewn throughout the cave, the majority of these were of rabbit, ape and ox mixed with many rodent bones. Chert engraving tools were found along with engraved bone bead (necklace) possibly engraved with one of those stone tools. A human burial was also discovered during the excavation. The discovery was made by George Palao in 1966 where four human remains possibly from Neolithic period were found, two female skeletons and two male skeletons. Unfortunately there is no record of this excavation in the Gibraltar Museum.

== Preservation ==
The cave also represents an example of why it is important to preserve these caves. This cave was only discovered in 1966 but surveys have shown that many of the stalactites have been broken off and the pools have been stirred. This cave contains three perfect palettes. This is a phenomenon where calcium carbonate floats on the very still water and over the millennia it creates a stone rim that appears to float on the water. The final effect can appear like a painter's palette.
