= Wynfrid Duckworth =

British anatomist (1870–1956)

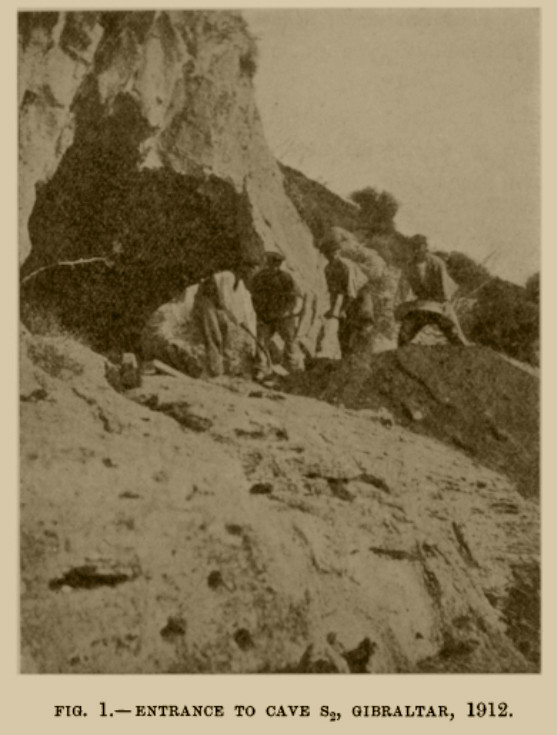
Entrance to Cave S in 1910

Wynfrid Lawrence Henry Duckworth (5 June 1870 – 14 February 1956) was a British anatomist, and former Master of Jesus College, Cambridge. The Duckworth Laboratory (Department of Biological Anthropology) at Cambridge University is named after him.

== Life ==
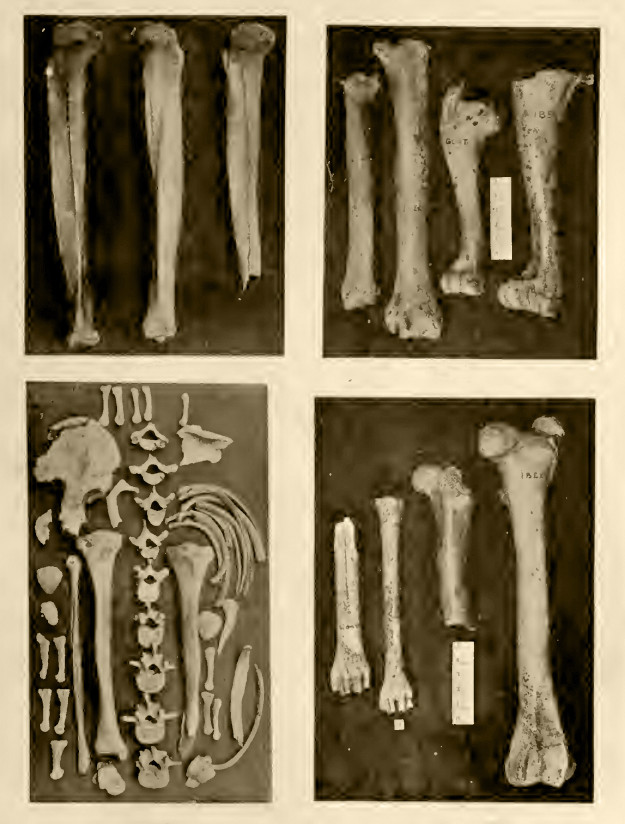
Specimens found in Cave S by Dr Wynfrid Duckworth – possibly from an exhibition in the Garrison Library in 1910

Wynfrid Lawrence Henry Duckworth was born in Liverpool to Henry Duckworth and Mary Bennett, Duckworth attended Birkenhead School and the École Libre des Cordéliers before studying sciences at Jesus College, Cambridge. He began a lifelong college fellowship in 1893, and during the Second World War served as Master. Duckworth obtained his medical degree in 1905 after training at St Bartholomew's Hospital. in 1910 he was reporting on excavations that he was involved with in Gibraltar. He found an ancient skeleton in Cave S. Duckworth taught physical anthropology and anatomy during various periods, interrupted by a term on the General Medical Council and a commission in the Royal Army Medical Corps. He also served as the president of the Anatomical Society of Great Britain and Ireland from 1941 to 1943. Duckworth was the last surviving member of the Anatomical Society to have been elected in the 1800s. Duckworth lived for exactly one year after his wife, dying at a nursing home in Cambridge.

== The Duckworth Collection ==
Duckworth performed anthropological and anatomical research for much of his career, and accumulated a collection that supplied both the Cambridge anatomy school museum and the new Duckworth Laboratory in the University Museum of Archaeology and Anthropology. The Duckworth Collection is now held in the Leverhulme Centre for Human Evolutionary Studies, University of Cambridge, where it is available for academic study

Directors

- Marta Mirazón Lahr (2000—2021)
