= Monkey's Cave =

Cave in Gibraltar

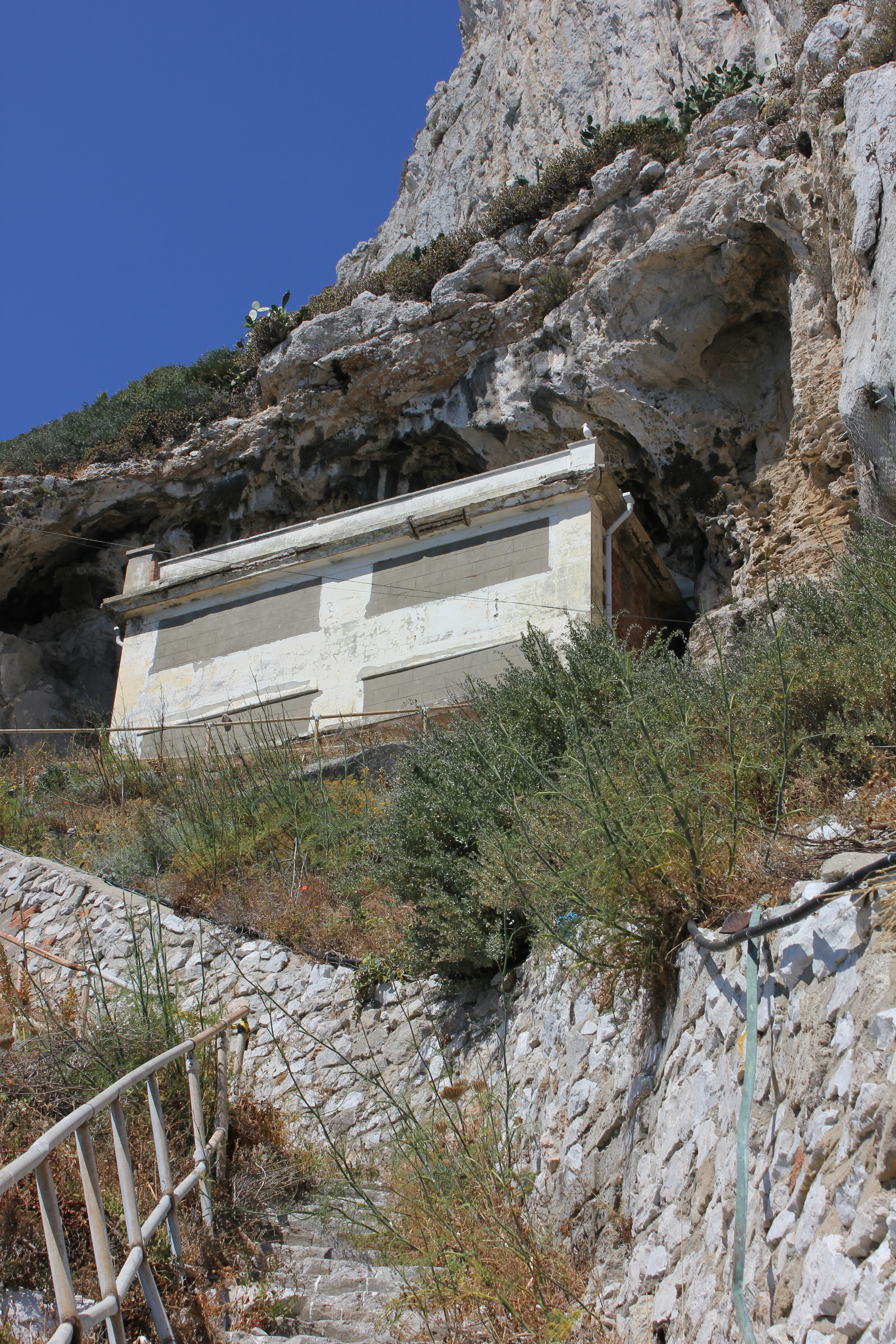
- Abandoned Monkey’s Cave Convalescent Hospital
- Interactive map of Monkey's Cave
- Coordinates: 36°7′15.94″N 5°20′31.49″W

Monkey's Cave is a cave in the British Overseas Territory of Gibraltar. It has been used as part of the Fortifications of Gibraltar and in 1942 there was a convalescent hospital here. This building was later used as the HQ of the Royal Electrical & Mechanical Engineers.

== Description ==
Blocks of Quaternary Monkey's Cave Sandstone are said to be "still visible in gun embrasures fringing the cliffs of the southwest Europa coast." This cave was described as Batterie de la Caverne in a French map of 1811 and Monkey Cave in 1859 and it was itself one of the few fortifications on the east side of Gibraltar, although the details of its armament are not given.

Monkey's Cave was used during the Second World War as an entrance to the artificial tunnel named AROW Street, which was used for storing ammunition and supplies. Within the cave entrance a convalescent hospital was constructed.

Soldiers in 1953 who were in the Royal Electrical & Mechanical Engineers would enter AROW Street through this cave and make their way to their instrument workshop located in the Rock. The engineers would get to their cave along one of the many internal roads that run within the Rock of Gibraltar. Their cave had windows which allowed the engineers to work with natural light and they were able to see views across the Straits of Gibraltar to Africa.
