= Bennett's Cave =

Cave in Gibraltar

- Interactive map of Bennett's Cave
- Coordinates: 36°07′12.4″N 5°20′31.9″W

Bennett's Cave is a cave in the British Overseas Territory of Gibraltar. It forms part of the Gorham's Cave complex which is a UNESCO World Heritage Site.

== Description ==
Bennett's Cave is one of four caves which together make up the Gorham's Cave complex which is a UNESCO World Heritage Site. The other caves are Vanguard, Gorham's and Hyaena Cave. Bennett's cave, like the other three, has been gradually filled with sand that has been blown in over thousands of years. These sands fall and over time they build up to remarkable depths. In the case of Vanguard Cave and Gorham's Cave the deposits are more than seventeen metres deep. Because of this the layers of sand record the environment from 15,000 to 55,000 years ago when the area was very different. In the past, the sea level was lower and the shoreline was over 4,500 metres from the caves whereas today it is very close.

The cave is listed in the Gibraltar Government's Heritage and Antiquities Act 2018.
