= Gorham's Cave =

Cave and archaeological site in Gibraltar

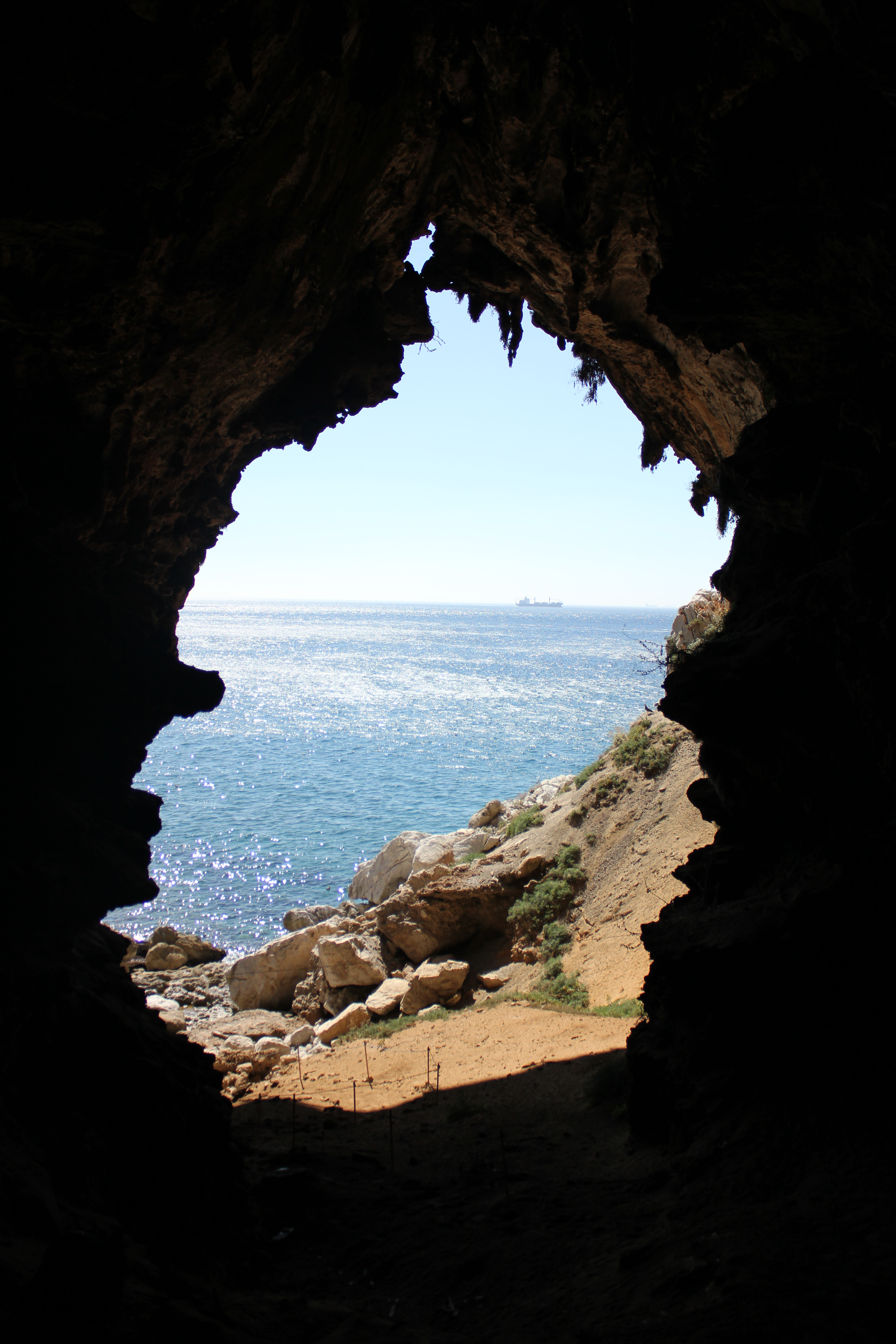
- View of the Alboran Sea from inside Gorham's Cave, Gibraltar

- Location within Gibraltar
- Location: Southeast face of the Rock of Gibraltar, Gibraltar
- Coordinates: 36°07′13″N 5°20′31″W
- Depth: 18 metres (59 ft)
- Discovery: 1907
- Geology: Limestone

UNESCO World Heritage Site
- Official name: Gorham's Cave Complex
- Type: Cultural
- Criteria: iii
- Designated: 2016 (40th session)
- Reference no.: 1500
- Region: Europe

Gorham's Cave (Spanish: Cueva de Gorham, pronounced [ɡoˈɾam]) is a sea-level cave in the British overseas territory of Gibraltar. Though not a sea cave, it is often mistaken for one. Considered to be one of the last known habitations of the Neanderthals in Europe, the cave gives its name to the Gorham's Cave complex, which is a combination of four distinct caves of such importance that they are combined into a UNESCO World Heritage Site, the only one in Gibraltar. The three other caves are Vanguard Cave, Hyaena Cave, and Bennett's Cave.

It is located at Governor's Beach on the southeastern face of the Rock of Gibraltar. When first inhabited some 55,000 years ago, it would have been approximately 5 km (3.1 mi) from the shore, but, due to changes in sea level, it is now only a few metres from the Mediterranean Sea.

== Discovery ==
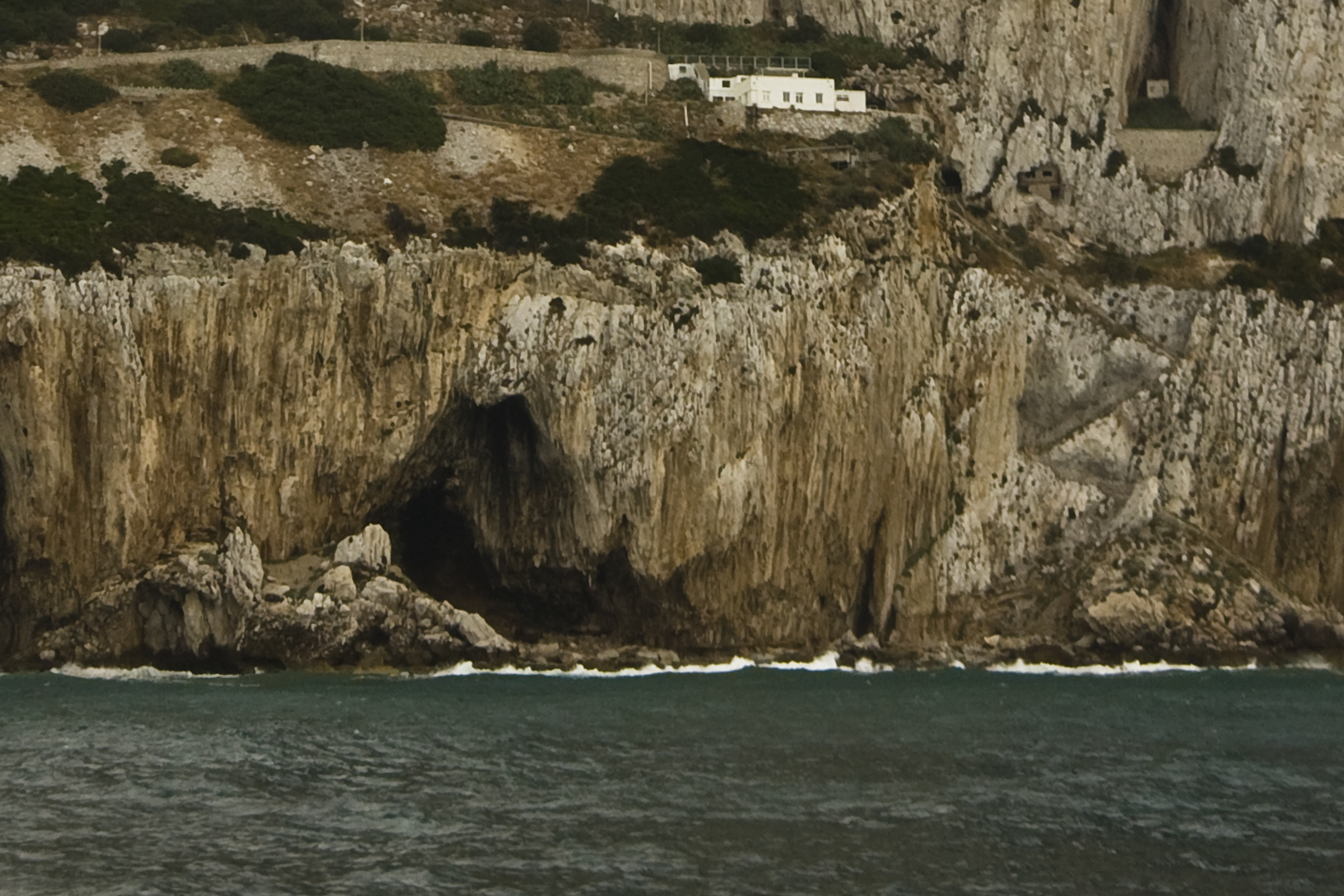
View of Gorham's Cave on the east face of the Rock of Gibraltar

The cave is named after Captain A. Gorham of the 2nd Battalion Royal Munster Fusiliers, who discovered it in 1907 while opening a fissure at the rear of a sea cavern. Gorham inscribed his name and the date of his discovery in lamp-black on the wall of the cave, which has borne his name ever since. After this initial discovery, it seems the cave was forgotten—at least at an official level—as Gibraltarian historian and potholer George Palao recalls an inscription on the cave wall that read J. J. Davies 1943.

== Description ==
Gorham's Cave is a cave situated on the east side of Gibraltar a few meters above sea level which has formed in Jurassic limestone. Total length of this cave is approximately 100 m (330 ft) and at the entrance it is approximately 35 m (115 ft) high. Farther inside, the cave becomes narrower and turns at approximately 90 degrees. From the entrance of the cave, the view opens onto the Alboran Sea. It is possible that after further research, the cave will become longer.

== Archaeology ==
=== Discovery and early work ===
Gorham's Cave has been a site of archaeological interest since its importance was first recognised. The beach below the cave (Governor's Beach) had been inaccessible from the cliffs above; however, after one episode of a tunnelling project in the rock, the beach and cave became accessible due to the pile of spoil that was created.

Royal Engineers Keighley and Ward were the first to report artefacts of archaeological interest in the cave via the Gibraltar newspapers. They had found pottery and stone tools. Moreover, they reported that human and animal remains had been discovered in Gorham's cave. Rev. F. E. Brown of the Gibraltar Society reported these findings to the governor of Gibraltar who requested further investigations after a site visit. These investigations were reported to the British Museum for their deliberation.

Lieutenant George Baker Alexander, Royal Engineer and a graduate geologist from the University of Cambridge, arrived in Gibraltar in 1945. He decided to make a geological survey of Gibraltar that resulted in a detailed geological map. Alexander was the first to excavate Gorham’s Cave, before his departure from Gibraltar in 1948 after the Gibraltar Museum challenged his methods. There are no preserved materials about these excavations.

In 1945, the governor wrote to the British Museum requesting that they continue further explorations of the cave. The museum had no resources, however, so they forwarded his enquiry to Professor Dorothy Garrod at Cambridge, who had found a Neanderthal skull at Devil's Tower Cave during her earlier work in Gibraltar in the 1920s. Garrod sought the assistance of Dr. John d'Arcy Waechter, a fellow of the British Institute of Archaeology at Ankara. Waechter arrived in September 1948 and spent two months digging test pits to see if further excavation would be justified. Waechter's success resulted in his return in June 1950. He went back to England in 1951, without concluding the work and returned from February to July 1952. During a final visit in 1954 he successfully requested financial assistance from the local government to complete his work.

In September 2021, archaeologists from the Gibraltar National Museum led by Prof Clive Finlayson announced the discovery of a 40,000 year-old Neanderthal cave chamber in the Gorham's Cave Complex, including a carving that may have been early Neanderthal artwork.

=== Periods, dates, human species ===
Excavation of this site has resulted in the discovery of four layers of stratigraphy, one below the other:

- Level I has produced evidence for eighth to third centuries BC use by Phoenicians.
- Level II produced evidence for brief Neolithic use.
- Level III has yielded at least 240 Upper Paleolithic artefacts of Magdalenian and Solutrean origin.
- Level IV has produced 103 items, including spear-points, knives, and scraping devices that are identified as Mousterian, and shows repeated use over thousands of years.

Accelerator mass spectrometry (AMS) dating gives dates for level IV of between 33 and 23 thousand years before the present (kyr BP)—the researchers felt that the uncertainties at this time depth made calibration impractical. They suggest occupation until at least 28 kyr BP and possibly 24 kyr BP.

No fossil remains have been found that would allow identification pointing to either Neanderthal or anatomically modern human inhabitants, nor associated with findings of a modern human in a site at nearby Abrigo do Lagar Velho, Portugal of 24,500 years ago who may have featured Neanderthal genetic admixtures, although Mousterian culture normally is identified with Neanderthals in Europe.

=== Scratched floor ===
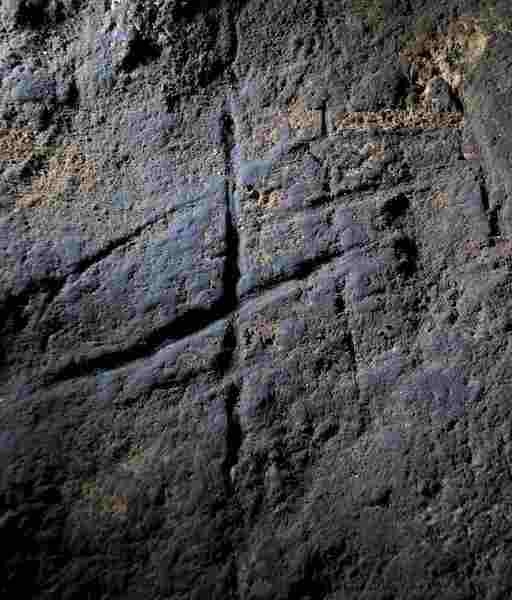
The scratched floor of Gorham's Cave

In July 2012, the floor of the cave was found to be deeply scratched. Researchers uncovered a series of criss-crossing lines over ~1 m^{2} (11 sq ft), cut into the surface of a ledge about 100 metres (330 ft) from its entrance. The scratches consist of eight lines arranged in two groups of three long lines and intersected by two shorter ones, which has been used to suggest it is a symbol. The scratches are thought to be at least 39,000 years old, because they were found below a layer of undisturbed sediment of that age in which hundreds of Neanderthal stone tools were discovered.

The attribution of the scratches to Neanderthals is disputed. Matt Pope of University College London cautions that "linking them directly to Neanderthal populations, or proving Neanderthals made them without any contact with modern humans is harder. The dates were indirectly obtained and refer to the material from within sediments covering the scratches and not the marks themselves. Given the dates also span a period when we know modern humans have reached Europe, a period where we have unresolved 'transitional' archaeological evidence difficult to attribute to either population, I'd be cautious in accepting Neanderthal authorship." Harold Dibble of the University of Pennsylvania also questioned the accuracy of the dating. He suggests that the scratches could have been made by modern humans and subsequently been covered by older sediments shifting within the cave.

Nevertheless, it has been described as "abstract art" by Joaquín Rodríguez-Vidal of the University of Huelva, for whom it is "the first directly demonstrable example of an abstract work, carried out consistently and with care and requiring prolonged and concentrated work, that has been produced in a cave." He claims that "creating paintings or carvings in caves is seen as a cognitive step in human development. This behaviour was considered exclusive to modern humans and has been used as an argument to distinguish our direct ancestors from ancient man, including Neanderthals." The issue of the artistic abilities of Neanderthals has been a long-running topic of controversy. Other alleged examples of Neanderthal art have been found in other caves in Europe, including motifs in Spain, and possible "jewellery" in France.

The team researching the Gorham's Cave scratches sought to determine whether it might have been produced accidentally, for example as a by-product of using the rock as a surface for cutting meat or fur. They carried out experiments with tools similar to those that would have been available at the time to carve grooves into blocks of similar dolomite rock, to identify how the scratches might have been made. They decided that the lines were most likely created by using a pointed tool or cutting edge to scrape repeatedly along, and deepen, an existing groove, taking as many as 300 strokes and requiring at least an hour's work. In addition, the scratches are in what would have been a very visible location and would have been immediately noticeable to anyone entering the cave.

Those who claim it has symbolic meaning cannot explain what it would have meant. Clive Finlayson of the Gibraltar Museum notes that "the engraving is at the point in the cave where the cave's orientation changes by 90 degrees" and speculates whether the scratches were related to the location: "It's almost like Clapham Junction, like it's showing an intersection. I'm speculating, but it does make you wonder whether it has something to do with mapping, or saying: 'This is where you are'." Francesco d'Errico, the director of research at CRNS, comments: "It's in a fixed location so, for example, it could be something to indicate to other Neanderthals visiting the cave that somebody was already using it, or that there was a group that owned that cave." Harrold Dibble comments that "It takes more than a few scratches—deliberate or not—to identify symbolic behaviour on the part of Neanderthals."

== UNESCO World Heritage Site ==
Gorham's Cave gives its name to the Gorham's Cave complex, which is a grouping of four distinct caves of such importance that they are combined into a UNESCO World Heritage Site. The three other caves are the nearby Vanguard Cave, the Hyaena Cave, and Bennett's Cave.

In November 2010, the Gorham's Cave complex was put forward to compete for a nomination as a UNESCO World Heritage Site. Professor Clive Finlayson, director of the Gibraltar Museum, was responsible for co-ordinating the efforts to obtain this nomination. The first step was a proposal to the United Kingdom cultural authorities to get Gorham's Cave complex added to the UK's World Heritage tentative list. Such a list is revised every ten years, and the process for a new list was ongoing at the date of the submission.

The ownership of land associated with Gorham's Cave was passed from the UK Ministry of Defence to the government of Gibraltar in 2011. The agreement swapped this MOD land and more than 300 MOD houses with the government of Gibraltar, who in exchange agreed to build 90 new houses on remaining MOD land.

In May 2012 Gorham's Cave complex was on the short list of two sites, along with the Forth Rail Bridge, that was forwarded for submission to UNESCO. The site was inscribed by UNESCO as a World Heritage site on 15 July 2016, and is Gibraltar's only World Heritage site.

== Fauna ==
The Gorham's Cave Complex is home to various species of bat, among them the European free-tailed bat.

The cave complex also forms the largest wintering roost of Eurasian crag martins in the world, peaking at 12,000 birds in the 2020-2021 winter season, making up 1–2% of the entire European population of this species.

== See also ==
- Gibraltar 1
- Gibraltar 2
