= Vanguard Cave =

Cave and archaeological site in Gibraltar

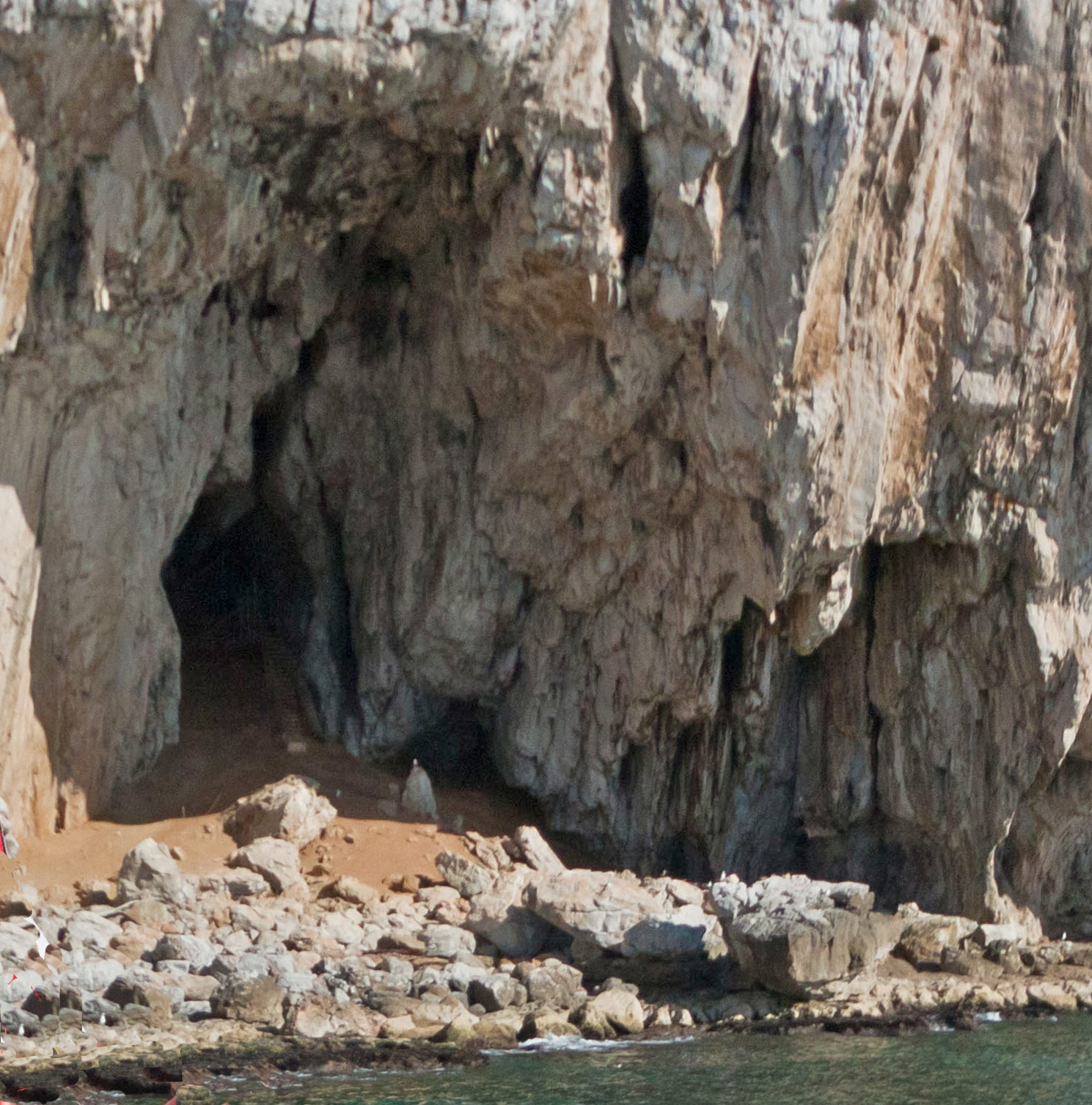

- Location within Gibraltar
- Location: Below the eastern side of the Rock of Gibraltar
- Coordinates: 36°07′17.5″N 05°20′31″W
- Depth: 17 metres (56 ft)
- Height variation: 35 metres (115 ft)
- Geology: Limestone

Vanguard Cave is a natural sea cave in the British Overseas Territory of Gibraltar which is part of the Gorham's Cave complex. This complex of four caves is a UNESCO World Heritage Site. The cave complex is one of the last known habitations of the Neanderthals, with a period of inhabitation from 55,000 to 28,000 years ago. It is located on the southeast face of the Rock of Gibraltar.

== Description ==
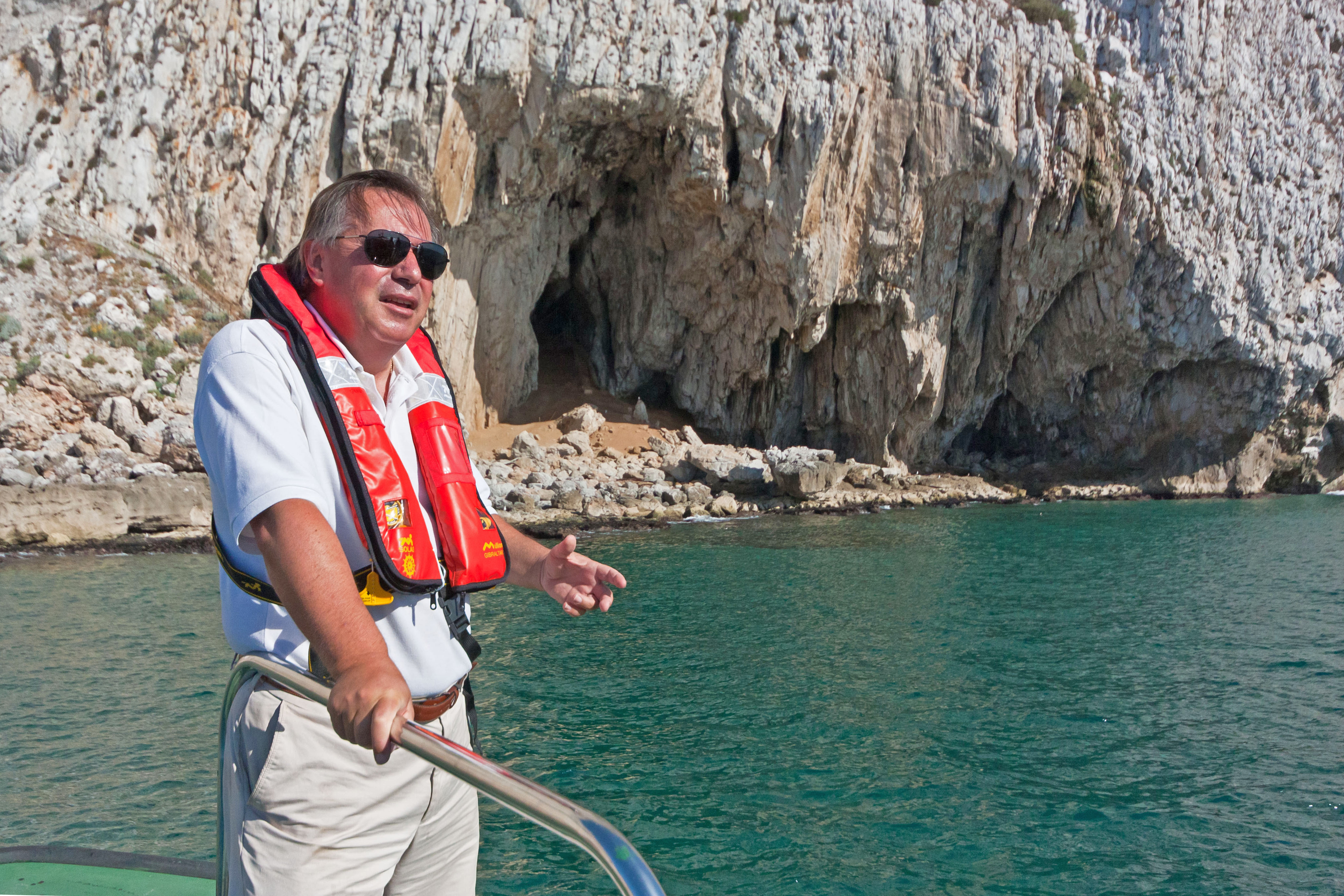
Prof. Clive Finlayson delivering a short talk for Gibraltarpedia just off Vanguard Cave.

Vanguard Cave is one of four caves which together make up the Gorham's Cave complex which is a UNESCO World Heritage Site, the others being Bennett's, Gorham's, and Hyaena Cave. Vanguard is a 35-metre (115 ft) high cave which contains 1.7 metres (5.6 ft) of deposits. These deposits have been blown into the cave over time and are mixed in with archaeological evidence. These can be excavated and analysed to reveal how the geography and life has changed during the time that they were deposited. Vanguard was first excavated in 1989, and lies just a few metres north of Gorham's Cave, which was excavated in 1951.

== Neanderthal inhabitation ==
In 2008 it was revealed that the cave supplied evidence that Homo neanderthalensis had a more varied diet than previously thought. The diet of H. neanderthalensis is now thought to have included fish and molluscs and marine animals like monk seal and dolphin. This may seem obvious given that Vanguard cave now looks out onto the Alboran Sea; however, scientists think that the cave was around 4.5 kilometres (2.8 mi) from the shore at the time of H. neanderthalensis. Lower sea levels may have also assisted ancient man by revealing islands between Gibraltar and the North African coast. This may have made the now 14 kilometres (8.7 mi) wide Strait of Gibraltar easier to cross and there are similar Mousterian sites in Morocco at Grottes des Pigeons and Jebel Irhoud.

The evidence does not just consist of a few bones. Researchers have been able to establish that the people there selected, collected and transported mussels to the cave. The cave contains a hearth, and H. neanderthalensis left evidence of burning which could be used to open the shells. The shellfish also included limpets and these are widely found at other H. neanderthalensis sites, however experts remain divided as to whether these were a significant part of the diet or just a useful snack. Clive Finlayson has argued that the diet was very varied and that evidence found within the caves indicates that six types of vegetation were within easy reach of the caves. H. neanderthalensis lived there for a short time but evidence shows that they were knapping stones as they ate the molluscs. Carcasses of seals were brought to the cave and comparison with H. neanderthalensis sites at Capellades in Catalonia indicate that after being hunted they were butchered in the cave. The stains on monk seal, ibex, and red deer bones support this theory. The list of animals eaten in Vanguard include bream, dolphins, sea urchins, and bluefin tuna.

Excavations in the middle part of the cave revealed a hearth that was used through at least three successive periods by H. neanderthalensis, with another ash layer containing a hearth, marine shells and stone tools in the upper part of the cave marking a shorter period of occupation.

== Archaeology today ==
Vanguard Cave is a site of continuing archaeological interest. There was a long investigation in August 2012 which involved an international team brought to Gibraltar. The team spent three weeks excavating at Gorham's cave and three weeks at Vanguard.

In September 2021, archaeologists from the Gibraltar National Museum led by Prof Clive Finlayson announced the discovery of a 40.000 year-old Neanderthal cave chamber in the Gorham's Cave Complex, including a carving that may have been early Neanderthal artwork.

== See also ==
- Gorham's Cave
- Gibraltar 1
- Gibraltar 2
