= George Palao =

Gibraltarian historian

George L. Palao BEM
- Palao c. 1977 assembling pottery from fragments found in the caves of Gibraltar.
- Born: 4 October 1940; Kensington, London, United Kingdom
- Died: 24 June 2009 (aged 68); Gibraltar
- Citizenship: Gibraltarian
- Education: Gibraltar Technical School; Gibraltar Dockyard School
- Alma mater: South East London Technical College
- Occupation: Draughtsman
- Employer: Government of Gibraltar
- Awards: British Empire Medal

George L. Palao BEM (4 October 1940, Kensington, United Kingdom - 2009, Gibraltar) was a Gibraltarian historian and potholer and illustrator. He was particularly known for his excavations and finds in many caves of Gibraltar.

== Early years ==
Born in Kensington, London on 4 October 1940, George Palao became part of an entire generation of Gibraltarians who were born away from the Rock after their parents were evacuated from Gibraltar along with most of the civilian population during World War II. When the war ended he and his family were repatriated to Gibraltar where he attended the Gibraltar Technical School and the Gibraltar Dockyard School. In 1958 Palao took up employment as a draghtsman for the Government of Gibraltar at their Public Works Department Drawing Office. He returned to London in 1970 to further his studies, enrolling on a two-year course at the South East London Technical College where he attended their Department of Building and Structural Engineering. He returned to Gibraltar in 1972.

== Historical and caving research ==
Palao had actively pursued his interests in Gibraltar's history, pre-history, geology and archaeology since 1965, which led him to the discovery and excavation of many of the caves of Gibraltar, uncovering valuable material and information in the process. He led the Gibraltar Cave Research Group in the late 1950s and 60s, with many of the group's finds now kept at the Gibraltar Museum. He was also a keen diver, a skill he exploited to excavate a number of underwater sites along Gibraltar's coast. Palao's passion for history and archaeology saw him become a member of the Royal Archaeological Institute and the Prehistoric Society of Britain. His work in these research fields was officially recognised when he was awarded the British Empire Medal by Queen Elizabeth II in her Birthday Honours of 1976.

== Works ==
Palao wrote many articles and constantly delivered talks and lectures to various organisations and schools on the subjects of geology and pre-history. His best known research are five of his books which were published between 1975 and 1985:

- Palao, George (1975). The Guns and Towers of Gibraltar. Ashford, Buchan & Enright. ISBN 0948466014.
- Palao, George (1977). Gibraltar: Our Forgotten Past. Ferma.
- Palao, George (1979). Gibraltar: Our Heritage. Ferma.
- Palao, George (1981). Gibraltar: Tales of Our Past. Ferma.
- Palao, George (1982). Gibraltar: Genesis and Evolution. Ferma.

By writing these books Palao wanted "to increase the understanding and appreciation of Gibraltar's vast historical assets by those who live on the Rock and visitors alike". He managed to achieve this by bringing Gibraltar's rich history and heritage to the fore of the general public as no one had previously achieved.

Palao was also an accomplished illustrator, a skill he developed during his career as a draughtsman. He often complemented his written works with simple yet detailed line drawings of representations of events, people, costumes, warfare technologies, monuments and artefacts which have been used as resources at various schools in Gibraltar. His collection of illustrations includes many technical drawings of caves and other historical sites in Gibraltar. Palao was also commissioned to illustrate The Rock of the Gibraltarians: A History of Gibraltar, a book authored by former Governor of Gibraltar Sir William Jackson in 1987, considered to be the most complete history of Gibraltar and its people.

Although it was lesser known by the general public, Palao was also an accomplished model maker.
