= Heritage and Antiquities Act 2018 =

2018 Gibraltar heritage conservation law

Gibraltar Parliament
- Commenced: 16 August 2018

Legislative history
- Introduced: 22 March 2018

Repeals
- Gibraltar Heritage Act 1989

Summary
- Conservation of physical and intangible heritage
- Status: Current legislation

The Heritage and Antiquities Act 2018 is a Gibraltar law unanimously passed in 2018 by the Gibraltar Parliament to conserve the territory's physical and intangible heritage. The act repeals the previous Gibraltar Heritage Trust Act 1989 but does not eliminate the Gibraltar Heritage Trust established by the repealed act. The bill had been in the drafting process for 18 years. The drafting process took an especially long time due to consultation with restorers. The command paper was published in 2015, the bill was published on 22 March 2018, and the act's commencement date was 16 August 2018. The legislation was welcomed by the Gibraltar Heritage Trust.

The full list of protected buildings and monuments is available electronically. The act protects about 80 more buildings and monuments than the Gibraltar Heritage Trust Act 1989. Unlike the previous act, submerged sites are included in this list.

In 2020, city wall names were repainted as a result of the 2018 act.
