= Cengiz Yalçın =

Cengiz Yalçın was one of three men arrested by Spanish authorities on Wednesday, 1 August 2012, on suspicion that they were planning a terrorist attack for al-Qaeda.

Cengiz Yalcin, a Turkish national, was characterised as a "facilitator" in the cell. Yalcin was arrested in an apartment in La Línea de la Concepción where he resided; there authorities found computers, explosives, light aircraft handbooks, and radio-controlled aircraft. The suspect had been employed by Profield Contractors in Gibraltar for at least three years, and he crossed the border each day. He was identified as a site manager on the company's website, and he had participated in a construction project at Western Beach in July 2012. Yalcin was recognized by an acquaintance when the interior ministry of Spain released photos of the three men; an employee of Profield Contractors confirmed his identity. On the photographs that were released, the suspects were identified only by initials: C.Y., A.A.A., and M.A. On 1 August 2012, the Royal Gibraltar Police searched the company depot at Eastern Beach.

The two other men, Russian nationals eventually identified as Eldar Magomedov and Muhamed Ankari Adamov, were arrested earlier that day in Ciudad Real on a bus bound for France. All three suspects had been under surveillance by police and, in recent weeks, they had been operating a motorized paraglider in Gibraltar. Yalcin had purchased paragliding lessons for the other two suspects. There was concern that the trio had been planning an airborne terrorist attack. Before residing in Spain, the men had trained at camps in Afghanistan and Pakistan, and at least one was reported to be proficient with poisons and explosives. The three suspects appeared in Spain's National Court where they were questioned by a judge. Security at the border between Gibraltar and Spain was tightened, resulting in lengthy delays.

It was reported shortly thereafter that the Turk had requested that an instructor, from whom he'd been taking motorized paragliding lessons, assist him in obtaining aerial photographs of a supermarket or shopping centre in Gibraltar, "whatever it costs." After being informed that it was impossible, Yalcin questioned whether the photographs could be acquired in a light aircraft, claiming that he needed the image for a construction project he was undertaking at that location. It was later learned that one of the two Russians, Magomedov, had been using a false identity. The French alerted authorities that the two planned a trip to Spain to acquire explosives; they entered the country between April and May, although one source specified 20 May 2012. UK and American authorities had connected the two Russians with a Pakistani group. On 5 August 2012, Spanish judge Pablo Ruz issued a statement that the Royal Gibraltar Police, as well as authorities in France, Russia, and the United States, had been instrumental in the investigation surrounding the apprehension of the suspected terrorist cell.

Spanish investigating magistrate Pablo Ruz closed the investigation on March 21, 2013, at least partly because of a lack of cooperation from US authorities. The three men were freed without charge after serving nine months in solitary confinement. Adamov and Magomedov were subsequently deported to Russia while Yalcin remained in Spain.
