= Eastern Beach =

Eastern Beach can refer to:

- Eastern Beach, Gibraltar
- Eastern Beach, New Zealand
- Eastern Beach (Victoria), Geelong, Australia
