= Sailing at the 2019 Island Games =

- Venue: Royal Gibraltar Yacht Club
- Dates: 7–11 July

Sailing, for the 2019 Island Games, held at the Royal Gibraltar Yacht Club, Gibraltar in July 2019.

== Medal table ==
Rank	Nation	Gold	Silver	Bronze	Total
1	Guernsey	1	2	0	3
2	Saaremaa	1	1	2	4
3	Ynys Môn	1	0	0	1
4	Bermuda	0	0	1	1
Totals (4 entries)		3	3	3	9

== Results ==
Event	Gold		Silver		Bronze	
Laser Standard Rig	Dominic Breen-Turner; Ynys Môn	17	Andrew Bridgman; Guernsey	21	Peeter Kaju; Saaremaa	27
Laser Radial Rig	Clementine Thompson; Guernsey	10	Silver Vahstein; Saaremaa	14	Daniel Rüütel; Saaremaa	27
Team	Saaremaa; Peeter Kaju; Joosep Laus; Daniel Rüütel; Silver Vahstein	74	Guernsey; David Aslett; Andrew Bridgman; Eloise Tanguy; Clementine Thompson	105	Bermuda; Jordan Etemadi; Kalin Hillier; Scott Mello; Adriana Penruddocke	200
