= Profield Contractors =

Construction Company in Gibraltar

- Company type: Construction
- Founded: 1989
- Headquarters: Gibraltar
- Area served: Gibraltar
- Owner: John Summerfield
- Website: www.profield.gi

Profield Contractors, also referred to as Profield Contractors Ltd, is a Gibraltar-based construction company founded in 1989. The company has worked on a number of general construction and civil engineering projects in Gibraltar.

== History ==
The construction company Profield Contractors was established in 1989. Also known as Profield Contractors Ltd, the company is based in Gibraltar and owned by John Summerfield. The general building contractor's clients include the Government of Gibraltar, as well as private customers. Included among their projects are general construction works including design-build, and civil engineering works including geotechnical engineering. Their construction projects have ranged from £200,000 to over £6,000,000. Profield Contractors is a government-approved bidder for works of civil engineering and general construction.

== Portfolio ==
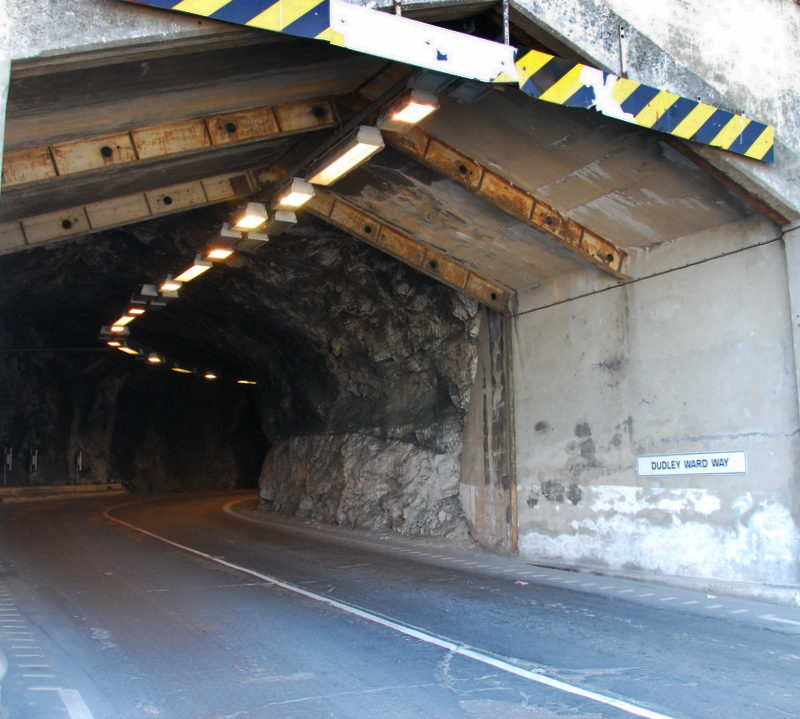
Dudley Ward Tunnel

Profield Contractors was one of the companies involved in the renovation of Dudley Ward Tunnel, also known as Dudley Ward Way, and the road approaching it. Gibraltarian Brian Navarro died in February 2002 in a rockfall accident on the road leading to the tunnel, after which the road and tunnel were closed. It was reopened eight years later, on 2 November 2010. The company's involvement in the project commissioned by the government included rockfall mitigation, including a protective canopy over the road approaching the tunnel, earthworks, and infrastructure, as well as building of a new road. Another civil engineering project undertaken by the company is the superstructure for a parking lot to accommodate 1,000 automobiles. The company also engineered the sewage diversion along Devil's Tower Road for Taylor Woodrow. The diversion was necessary for the construction of Filomena House (see below).

The Europa Road Incinerator is a geotechnical engineering project commissioned by the Government of Gibraltar. Profield Contractors was responsible for removal of rocks and installation of rock anchors and catch fences. The government also contracted with the company for the rockfall mitigation works for Cumberland Terraces, a project of affordable homes. This required the permanent installation of a catch fence.

The company built Gardiners House, an apartment building containing six luxury units, on Gardiners Road. Maida Vale House is a block of five townhouses on Engineer Road. The Catalan Terraces, thirteen townhouses at Catalan Bay, are a third example of general construction. All three examples represent new construction for private developers. In addition, Profield Contractors built the Cliftons for Taylor Woodrow. That project entailed renovation of a portion of the Royal Naval Hospital Gibraltar and its conversion to an apartment building with luxury units, Orchid House. In addition, a new floor was added for two penthouses. New construction in that project included three townhouses and a villa.

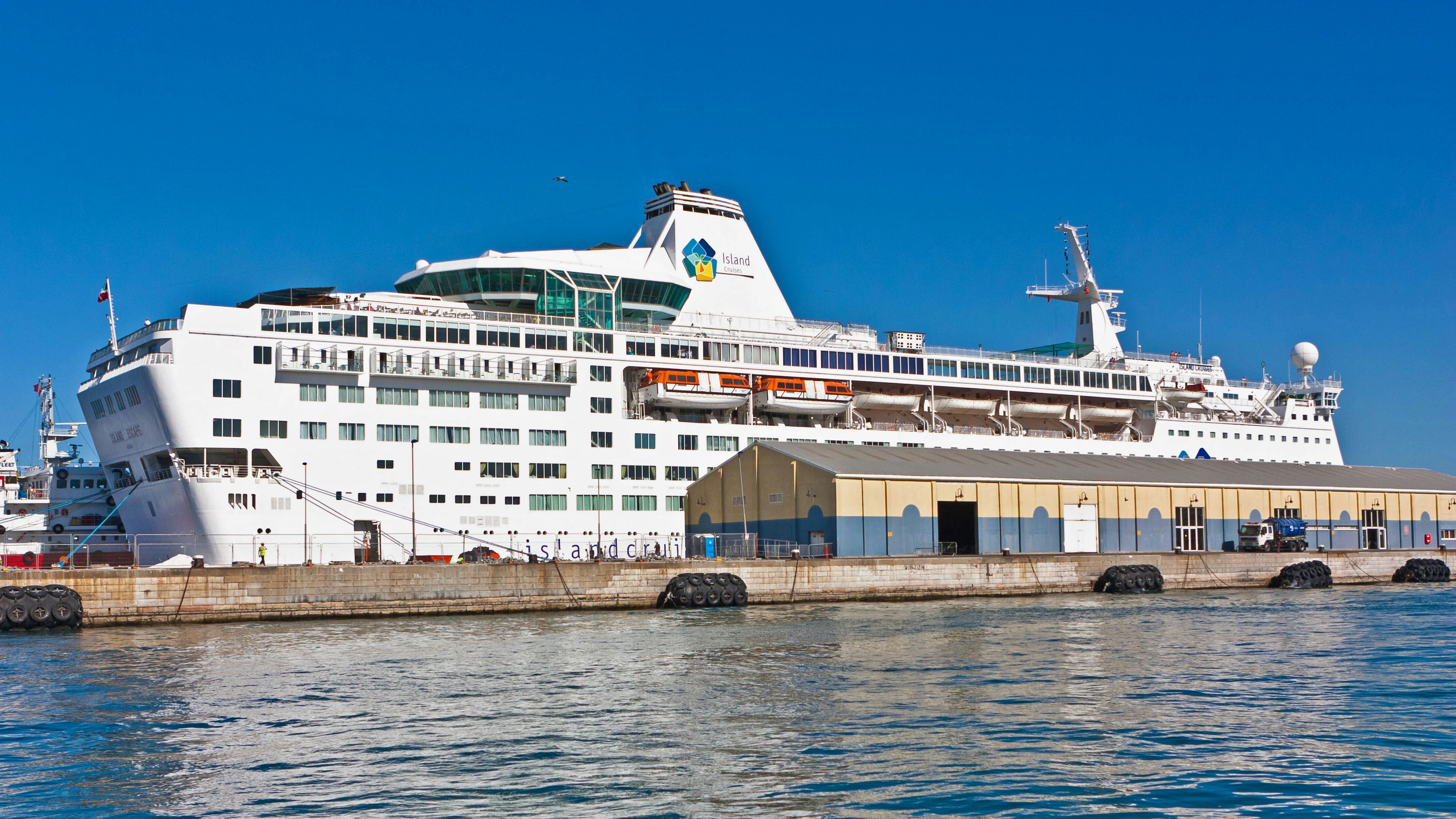
Gibraltar Cruise Terminal

Their design-build projects include the Gibraltar Cruise Terminal, a government commission. Construction of the terminal entailed renovation and conversion of an unused warehouse on the Western Arm of the North Mole at Gibraltar Harbour. After the walls of the warehouse were deemed structurally sound, the building was gutted, and given a new floor and roof. White stone walls and sunny, Mediterranean hues give the interior an airy, neoclassical appearance. Bishop Canilla House is an apartment building for the aged, with 84 units, including 14 for residents with special needs. The apartment building for the elderly was also commissioned by the Government of Gibraltar, and opened in 2000. Filomena House, for the developer Taylor Woodrow, is a ten-storey apartment building with 44 apartments. The flats range from studios to penthouses and are located on the east side of Gibraltar. Filomena House represents the first "affordable plus" project developed by Taylor Woodrow. Other examples of design-build projects undertaken by Profield Contractors are the additions to St Anne's School and Bishop Fitzgerald's School, both government contracts, and the addition of a new floor to 237 Main Street for a private client.

== Current projects ==
In June 2011, the Minister for Housing Fabian Vinet revealed that the contract for the renovation of the exterior of the Governor's Meadow House had been won by Profield Contractors. The contract from the Government of Gibraltar for the building at Alameda Estate is for £1M. The project includes installation of a new roof, windows, and blinds. Another contract that has been awarded by the government is that of management of the eastside reclamation project which also includes a temporary sea wall. The Royal Gibraltar Yacht Club moved from its location at 26 Queensway to temporary premises at 2 Queensway when the mid-harbour reclamation project left the yacht club landlocked in 2009. Profield Contractors has won the contract to construct a new club house and associated facilities on Coaling Island.
