= Great Gibraltar Sand Dune =

Sand dune in Gibraltar

- Sand dune
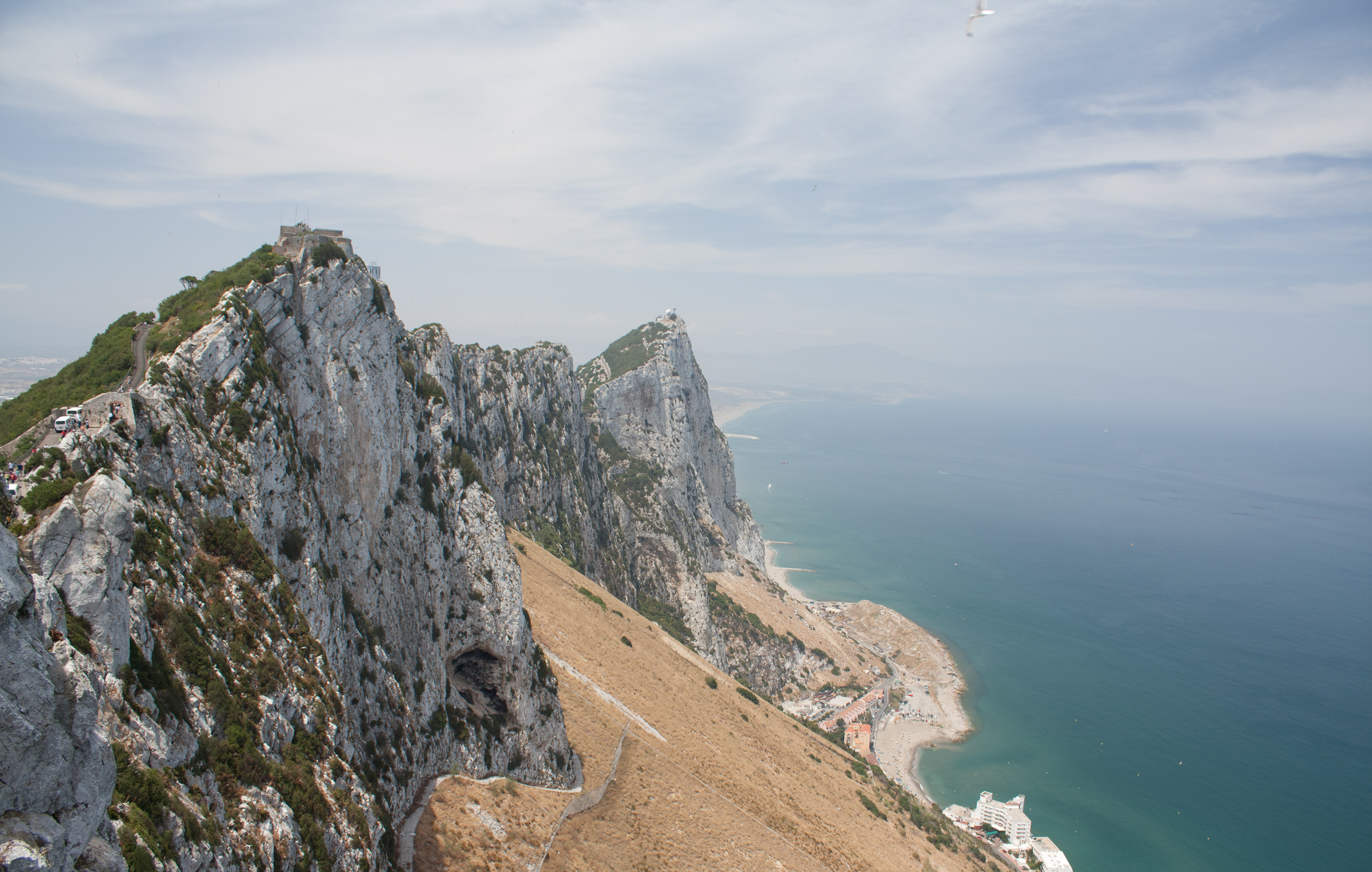
- View of the dune and eastern Mediterranean coast of Gibraltar from the Rock of Gibraltar.

- Location of the Great Sand Dune within Gibraltar.
- Coordinates: 36°08′03″N 5°20′36″W
- Age: Pleistocene
- Topo map: OS Gibraltar

The Great Gibraltar Sand Dune is an ancient sand dune in the British Overseas Territory of Gibraltar. It forms part of the Upper Rock Nature Reserve and dominates the eastern cliffs of the Rock of Gibraltar. It was once used to capture rainwater which was contained in underground tanks within the Rock to satisfy the population's potable water needs.

== Geology ==
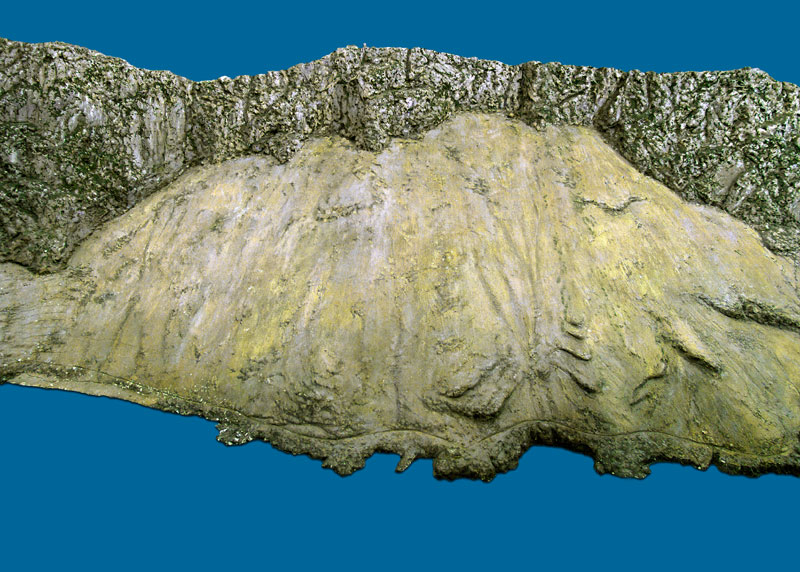
The Great Sand Dune as depicted in the 1865 scale model of Gibraltar, now at the Gibraltar Museum.

The prehistoric dune is made from yellow, windblown sands lacking the red component of the sands on the west side of the Rock. It is made of the same sand that once formed part of a vast savanna of the late Pleistocene where Neanderthals hunted. The levant winds of prehistory continuously blew sand from this savanna westwards, accumulating against the eastern cliffs of the Rock, reaching from the base of the cliff right down to sea level (at that time there was no road where Sir Herbert Miles Road is today). The occasional rockfall from the precipice above added boulders to the dune so the formation seen today is a consolidated composite of rocks and windblown sands. The upper limits of the dune were scarped by the British garrison for two reasons - to avoid soldiers deserting the place and to prevent surprise attacks by Spanish troops. The Great Sand Dune was constantly shifting right up to the late 19th century when corrugated iron sheets were laid over the dune for the collection of rainwater. John White described this and the efforts to make it inaccessible:

"The Eastern side of the hill consists of an immense sloping bank of whitish sand interspersed with huge fragments of rock, and reaching from the sea nearly to the summit of the rock in some parts not far from the Signal House, and the Middle-hill Guards. These parts were formerly accessible, which made it necessary to keep constant guards there, as well to prevent desertions from within as a surprise from without. Of late years, much labour has been bestowed in making all these parts more abrupt and difficult, yet it is still necessary to watch them, as there are always some hardy adventurers who will wantonly risk their lives down these perilous cliffs, either in attempting to desert or in search of flowers."

== Water catchments ==
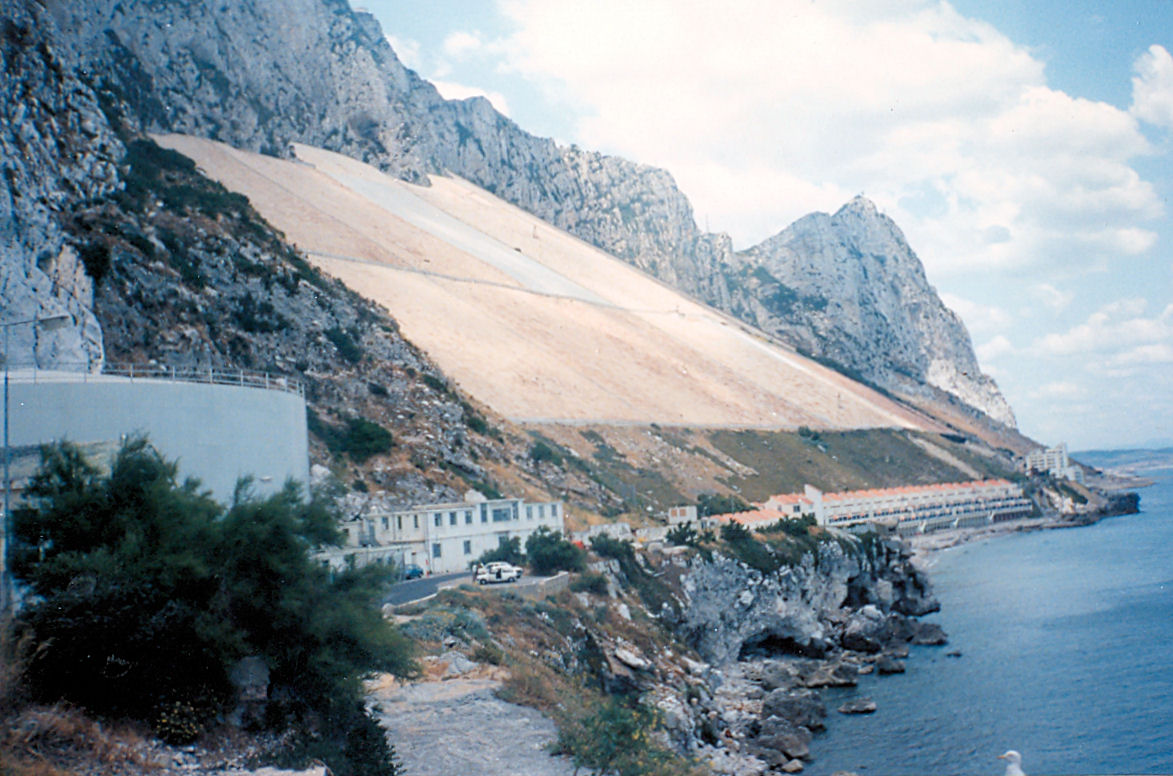
View of Sandy Bay, Gibraltar in 1992 showing the catchment areas

Gibraltar has few natural sources of fresh water, creating a constraint upon its population over the centuries. In 1898, the construction on the waterworks began with the construction of four 5,000,000 imperial gallons (23,000,000 L) reservoirs cut inside the western side of the Rock at an elevation of 103.6 metres (340 ft) above sea level, each being 60.96 metres (200.0 ft) long 15.24 metres (50.0 ft) high and with an average width of 6.1 metres (20 ft), with a total capacity of 22,727 square metres (244,630 ft^{2}). They were officially inaugurated by Governor of Gibraltar Sir George White in 1901. These reservoirs were initially fed by relatively small water catchment areas on the western side of the Rock above the Moorish Castle.

As Gibraltar's population and demand for a fresh water supply increased, further sources of supply were required and a scheme to expand the system was proposed and carried out. This consisted of the construction of a 40,000 square metres (4.0 ha) water catchment area on the east side of the Rock and the driving of an 800 metres (2,600 ft) tunnel through the Rock running east-west to channel the water to the existing reservoirs. The catchment which was the original idea of the then City Engineer of Gibraltar and was constructed in 1903 on the Great Sand Dune which has an average inclination of 1⅓ to 1. The largest of the boulders embedded in the dune were blasted away in order to trim the surface as even as possible. A footpath and channel for the collection of rainwater were constructed along the lower perimeter of the catchment area. Timber piles 1,500 millimetres (59 in) x 150 millimetres (5.9 in) x 40 millimetres (1.6 in) were driven their full length into the smoothed dune. To these a timber framing of 75 millimetres (3.0 in) x 75 millimetres (3.0 in) x 4,500 millimetres (180 in) purlins and 75 millimetres (3.0 in) x 75 millimetres (3.0 in) x 2,400 millimetres (94 in) rafters were nailed to them which was followed by screwing corrugated galvanised iron sheets 2,400 millimetres (94 in) x 900 millimetres (35 in) round the edges. The timber had been previously pressure treated with creosote at a pressure of 170 pounds per square inch (1,200 kPa). Further expansions of the Great Sand Dune catchments were carried out in stages up until 1961. The original plan was to cover an area of 10 acres (40,000 m^{2}). Between 1911 and 1914 a fifth reservoir was excavated inside the Rock and the catchment area increased to 24 acres (97,000 m^{2}). By 1961 the total catchment area had increased to its maximum of 34 acres (140,000 m^{2}). It took roughly 5,928 rafters, 1,112 purlins, 1,161 piles, 5,928 sheets, 2,920 kg of screws and 850 kg of washers for every hectare of the Great Dune that was covered.

== Other uses ==
The Great Dune served to maintain a regular supply of sand on the eastern beaches of Gibraltar, especially Sandy Bay particularly when the sea removed material from the beach. This dynamic nature meant that little vegetation of any significant height could grow on the dune with any permanence as many pre-catchment photographs demonstrate.

In 2001, the Gibraltar Ornithological and Natural History Society began to manage the phased work of dismantling the catchment construction. By 2006 the slope was entirely restored to its natural state and is now completely covered in vegetation native to the habitat of Gibraltar.

== See also ==
- Upper Rock Nature Reserve
- Sandy Bay, Gibraltar
- Water supply and sanitation in Gibraltar
