= Sandy Bay, Gibraltar =

Village and beach in Gibraltar

Sandy Bay
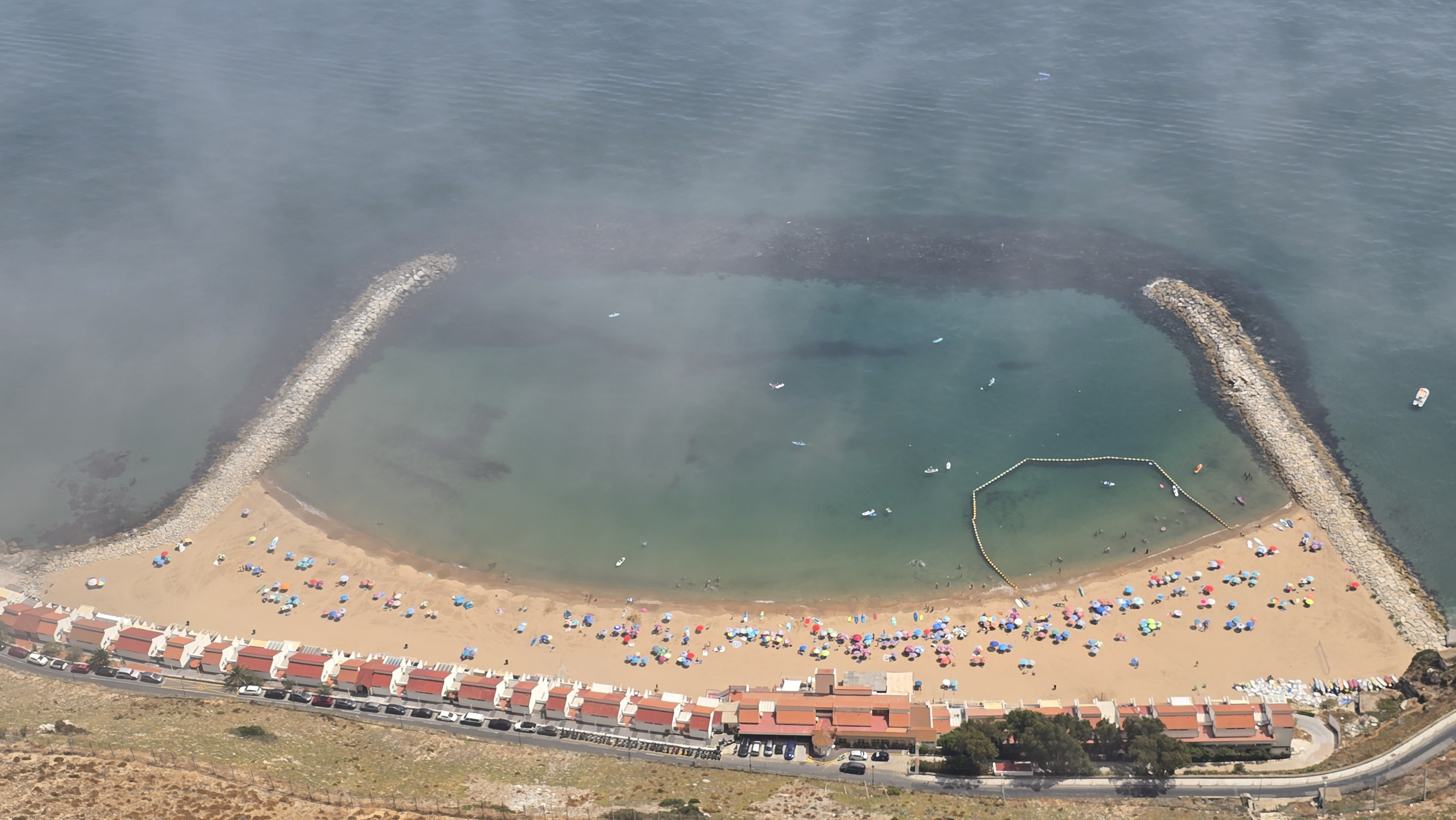
- Sandy Bay as seen from The Rock of Gibraltar Skywalk.

Location
- Country: Gibraltar
- Location: Gibraltar
- Coordinates: 36.131058°N 5.341514°W

Details
- Owned by: Government of Gibraltar
- Type of harbour: Natural/Artificial

Sandy Bay is a village, bay and beach located on a small bay on the eastern Mediterranean coast of Gibraltar, on the opposite side of The Rock from the main city. It is situated to the south of Catalan Bay and is accessible via Sir Herbert Miles Road.

== Water catchments ==
Directly above Sandy Bay and the Sir Herbert Miles coast road were Gibraltar's large water catchments, which are no longer in use. The slope on which they sat is the Great Gibraltar Sand Dune, an ancient consolidated sand dune which dominates the east side of the Rock of Gibraltar. The dune's naturally smooth surface allowed for the construction of a water catchment area made up of a corrugated steel sheets and a layer of concrete. Rainwater flowed down the slope into an open channel which fed into the reservoir system inside The Rock.

In 1898, work began on four 5 million gallon water reservoirs which were cut into the western side of The Rock. They were officially opened by Governor George Stuart White in 1901. These reservoirs were fed by relatively small water catchment areas on the western side of The Rock.

The water catchments above Sandy Bay were built in stages between 1903 and 1961, and were designed to cater for Gibraltar's ever increasing demand. The original plan was to cover an area of 10 acres (40,000 m^{2}). Between 1911 and 1914 a fifth reservoir was excavated inside the Rock and the catchment area increased to 24 acres (97,000 m^{2}). By 1961 the total catchment area had increased to its maximum of 34 acres (140,000 m^{2}).

== Today ==
In 2001, the Gibraltar Ornithological and Natural History Society began to manage the phased work of dismantling this catchment construction. By 2006 the slope was entirely restored to its natural state and is now completely covered in vegetation native to this unique habitat of Gibraltar.

It is possible to continue south along Sir Herbert Miles road and through Dudley Ward Tunnel all the way to Europa Point at the southern tip of Gibraltar. Following a rockfall on 18 February 2002, which killed a man, the Government concluded that the risk of further such incidents was too great, and the tunnel was closed indefinitely. However, in 2007 its reopening was suggested by the Government to ease traffic flow in the area of the new Rosia residential developments. The tunnel re-opened in November 2010, on completion of extensive engineering works.

Sandy Bay is home to one of the few residential areas on the east side of The Rock, known as Both Worlds.

=== Regeneration works ===
On 25 June 2014, officials of Gibraltar inaugurated the new Sandy Bay after a considerable public investment to recover the almost non-existent beach. The works enlarged the beach with approximately 50,000 tons of sand imported from Laayoune in the Western Sahara. Two curved groynes and a frontal breakwater were constructed to protect the beach from the full erosional impact of wave action and trap shifting sand, including a submerged breakwater connecting the ends of both groynes.

== See also ==
- Catalan Bay
- Eastern Beach, Gibraltar
