= MV Aurora (2000) =

Cruise ship

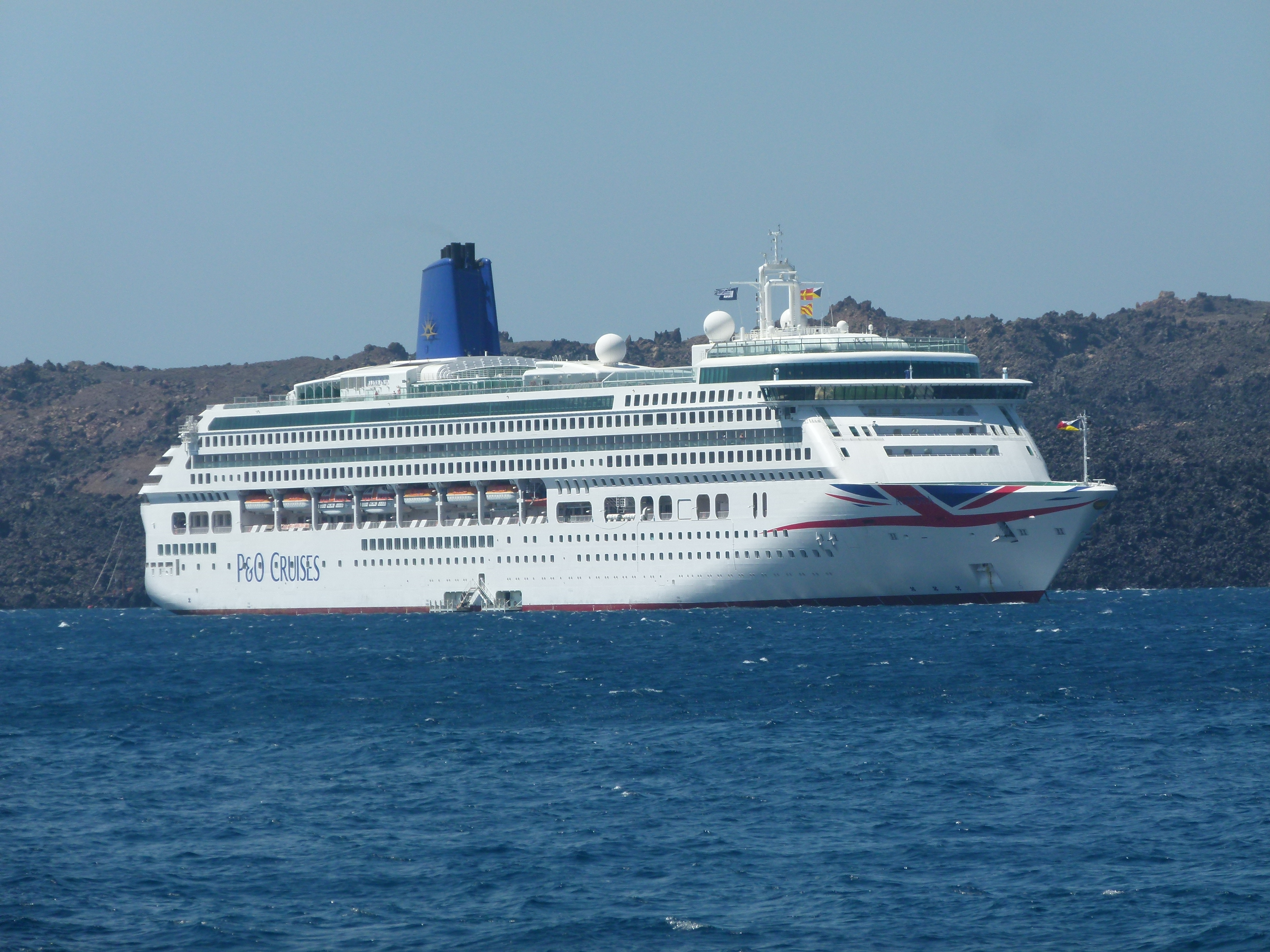
- Aurora at anchor in the Santorini basin, showing post 2014 livery

History

Bermuda
- Name: Aurora
- Owner: Carnival Corporation
- Operator: P&O Cruises
- Port of registry: (United Kingdom) London, England (2000–2007); Hamilton, Bermuda (2007–present)
- Builder: Meyer Werft, Papenburg, Germany
- Cost: $375 million
- Yard number: 640
- Laid down: 15 December 1998
- Launched: 18 January 2000
- Christened: 27 April 2000
- Maiden voyage: 1 May 2000
- In service: 2000–present
- Identification: Call sign: ZCDW9; IMO number: 9169524; MMSI number: 310556000
- Status: In service

General characteristics
- Tonnage: 76,152 GT; 8,486 DWT
- Length: 270.0 m (885 ft 10 in)
- Beam: 32.2 m (105 ft 8 in)
- Draught: 8.95 m (29.4 ft)
- Decks: 14
- Installed power: 4 MAN B&W 14V48/60 14-cyl diesels 19,710bhp each. Approximate fuel consumption 300 litres per nautical mile at 24 knots.
- Propulsion: Diesel-Electric
- Speed: 29 knots (54 km/h; 33 mph)
- Capacity: 1,878 passengers (regular); 1,950 passengers (maximum)
- Crew: 850

MV Aurora is a cruise ship of the P&O Cruises fleet. The ship was built by Meyer Werft at its shipyard in Papenburg, Germany. At over 76,000 tonnes, Aurora is the smallest and oldest of seven ships currently in service with P&O Cruises. She officially entered service with the company in April 2000 and was named by Anne, Princess Royal in Southampton, England. Aurora was refitted in 2014, during which the ship was the first of P&O's ships to receive an updated British Union Flag design on her bow and her funnel repainted from yellow to blue.

== Specifications ==
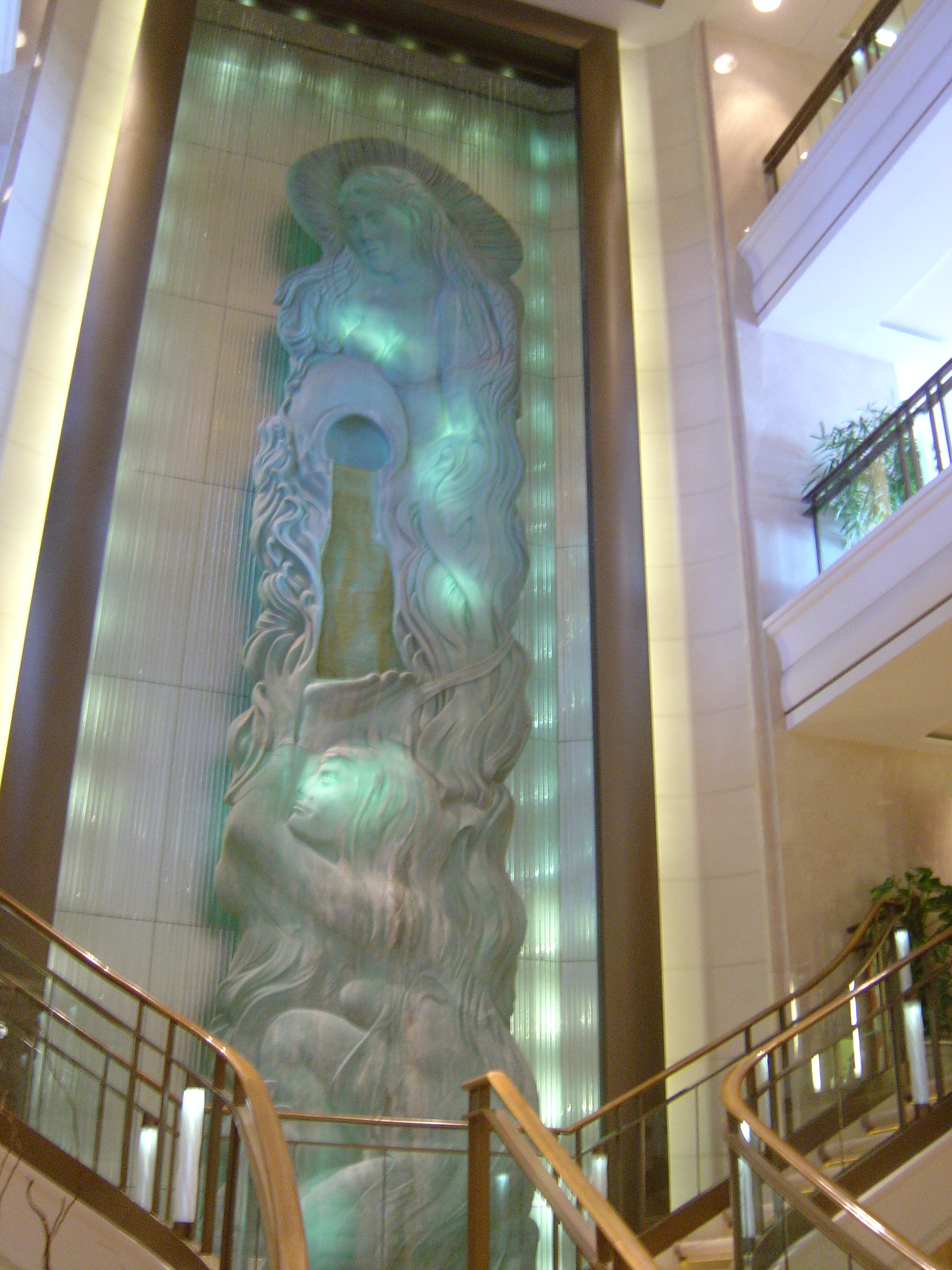
Aurora's atrium

Aurora is a mid-sized cruise ship, with an overall length of 270.0 metres (885 ft 10 in), moulded beam of 32.2 metres (105 ft 8 in) and draught of 7.90 metres (25 ft 11 in). Her gross tonnage is 76,152 and her deadweight tonnage is 8,486 tonnes. The ship can accommodate up to 1,878 passengers in 939 cabins, with a maximum crew complement of 936.

Aurora is powered by four 4-stroke, 14-cylinder MAN B&W 14V48/60 (48 cm Bore, 60 cm Stroke) medium-speed diesel engines with a total power output of over 78,800 brake horsepower (58,800 kW). These engines provide power for various ship's services and for two STN AEG propulsion motors. The propulsion motors drive two propellers, each of which measures 5.8 metres (19 ft 0 in) in diameter. Fuel consumption at 24 knots (44 km/h; 28 mph) is around 300 litres (66 imp gal; 79 US gal) of heavy oil per nautical mile. For manoeuvring, the ship has three bow thrusters and a stern thruster. The ship's service speed is 24 knots, though during sea trials she reached a maximum speed of 29 knots (54 km/h; 33 mph).

Aurora was designed to appeal to the British market, and was built as an extended and improved version of P&O Cruises' Oriana. The ship's hull and superstructure were designed to be attractive to this market with features similar to more traditional ocean liners, such as her raked, tiered stern.

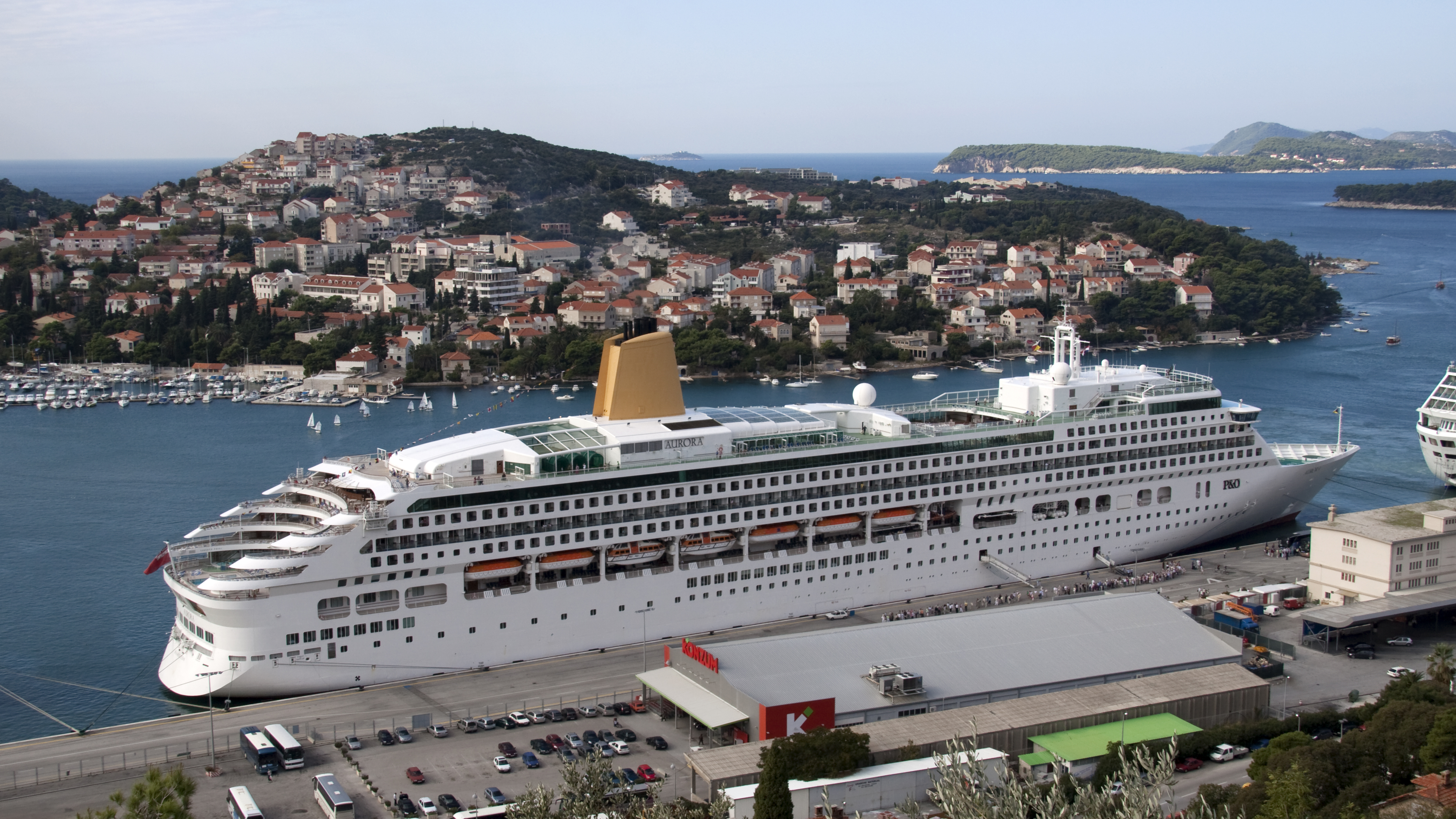
Aurora docked at Dubrovnik in pre 2014 livery.

== History ==
=== Construction and naming ===
Aurora was built by Meyer Werft in Germany. Her keel was laid in December 1998 and she was launched in January 2000. She was delivered to P&O Cruises in April 2000. The ship left the shipyard on 19 February 2000.

The ship was christened on 27 April 2000, by Princess Anne. The champagne bottle did not shatter when it hit the ship's side and fell unopened into the sea. This type of occurrence is considered a bad omen among seafarers, and this incident has been blamed for the numerous setbacks that Aurora has encountered throughout her career.

=== Maiden voyage ===
Aurora departed on her maiden voyage on 1 May 2000—a 14-night cruise to various Mediterranean destinations. The ship's crew identified a major technical problem, and the cruise was abandoned after 16 hours at sea. The cause was a propeller shaft bearing which had been damaged by overheating and required urgent repair while the ship was out of service.

On 3 May 2000, the ship returned to Southampton, where passengers disembarked. Passengers expressed disappointment about the incident but reported that they were mainly satisfied with P&O Cruises' response to the situation. P&O Cruises offered all passengers a full refund and compensation package, worth about GBP£6 million.

Aurora sailed to Blohm+Voss in Germany, where repairs were carried out. The ship returned to service on 15 May 2000, to undertake her second scheduled cruise to the Canary Islands.

=== Pamela Dream rescue effort ===
In March 2001, Aurora was sailing through the Taiwan Strait on her first world cruise when she was called to assist Pamela Dream, a Cambodian registered ship crewed by Russian officers and crew which had capsized in rough seas. Aurora launched her fast rescue boats to retrieve survivors from the water. The crew were able to retrieve three survivors. A crewmember described the sea state as "very rough, with waves of about 5 m (16 ft)". One of Aurora's propellers was damaged by flotsam, an inspection of the propeller was carried out in Singapore where it was polished by divers. The damaged propeller was eventually replaced in dry dock in Southampton in December 2002.

=== Norovirus breakout ===
During a cruise around the eastern Mediterranean in October 2003, over 500 passengers suffered stomach infections caused by the highly contagious Norovirus. During the outbreak, the ship's passengers were denied the right to land at Piraeus, Greece, as the ship was held in quarantine. Aurora departed from Piraeus on 31 October having loaded medical supplies.

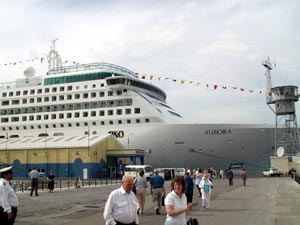
Aurora moored adjacent to the Gibraltar Cruise Terminal on the Western Arm of the North Mole in Gibraltar Harbour.

On arrival in Dubrovnik, Croatia, a health inspector boarded the vessel and ordered the sick passengers to remain in their cabins "as a precautionary measure". Those unaffected by the virus were allowed to leave the ship. There was uncertainty as to whether the ship would be allowed to dock in Gibraltar, the next scheduled port.

Aurora was allowed to dock in Gibraltar on 3 November. A small number of passengers who were still recovering were required to stay on board. Passengers who went ashore were required to leave their passports behind. One passenger had died from a heart attack, unrelated to the norovirus breakout. The Spanish government decided to close the border between Gibraltar and Spain on advice from its health ministry. It was reopened a few hours after Aurora departed from Gibraltar. The incident caused some diplomatic tension between the United Kingdom and Spain.

Aurora returned to Southampton on 6 November, where passengers disembarked. There was a widespread expression of disappointment, with some passengers threatening legal action against P&O Cruises. P&O Cruises said that while they would not offer a standard compensation package, cases would be considered individually.

=== World cruise 2005 ===
In January 2005, Aurora began a 103-day world cruise with more than 1,700 passengers on board. While bound for Madeira, the ship repeatedly had problems with one of the propulsion motors. Since the problems could not be solved quickly, the world cruise was abandoned. During the ship's time waiting in Southampton, passengers were offered free drinks in the onboard bars and were able to exit the ship at any time. Passengers were also permitted to cancel their booking for a full refund. After P&O Cruises cancelled the cruise, the company donated all of the food purchased for the trip to local charities around Southampton. Aurora set sail for a dry dock in Bremerhaven, Germany, where her damaged motor would be removed and replaced.

The planned world cruise hence affectionately became known as a voyage around the Isle of Wight or "the largest ever Isle of Wight ferry". The cruise was also dubbed the "World Booze Cruise" as the Company offered free drinks, free excursions and a 50 percent discount for the 2007 World Cruise after reimbursing all the fares for the 2005 World Cruise. P&O Cruises also arranged for entertainers such as Elaine Paige and Paul Daniels to come on board.

The cancellation of the cruise is reported to have cost the company GBP £25 million.

=== World cruise 2009 ===
During the 2009 World Cruise, Aurora again experienced problems with her propulsion system shortly after leaving Sydney, Australia. The ship continued to Auckland, New Zealand, to undergo repairs. The ship left Auckland for Hawaii on 12 March 2009. More than 600 passengers on the 93-night cruise attended an emergency meeting and formed a protest committee after the ship failed to dock at three ports in New Zealand and at two Pacific Islands. While P&O Cruises made offers of compensation, some passengers branded these offers "derisory" and threatened legal action against the company.

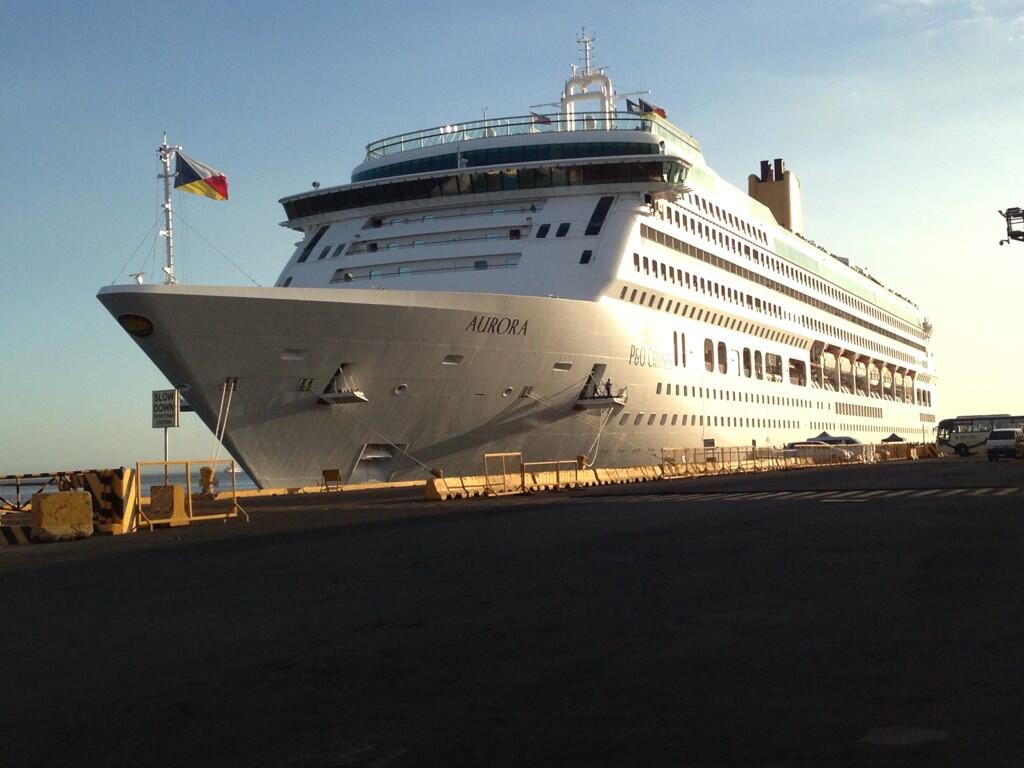
Aurora docked at Manila, Philippines in February 2014

=== Refits ===
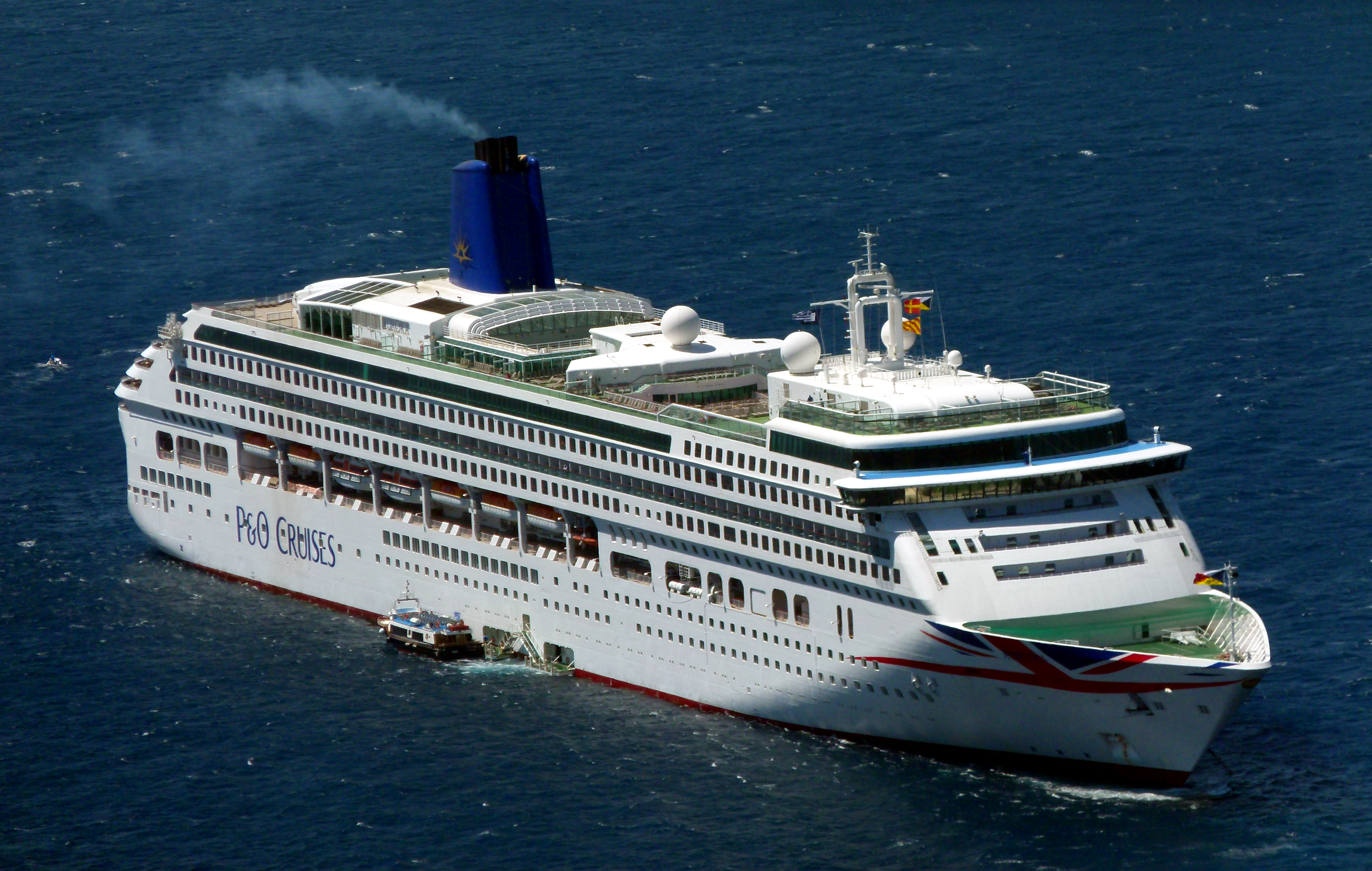
Aurora at anchor in the Santorini basin.

In 2014, Aurora was repainted in P&O's new house livery with a stylised Union Flag on the bows, and the funnel painted blue instead of the customary P&O yellow.

She underwent a further dry dock refurbishment during March and April 2019.

During the 2020 coronavirus layoff, the vessel spent some time anchored off Bournemouth.

On 28 March 2023, P&O Cruises announced that it was updating the guest areas on Aurora including new balcony chairs, chairs in cabins and furniture on the open decks. These changes were expected to be completed by May 2023. P&O Cruises has also announced that Aurora will have a refit in April 2025.
