= Our Lady of Sorrows Church, Gibraltar =

Our Lady of Sorrows Church
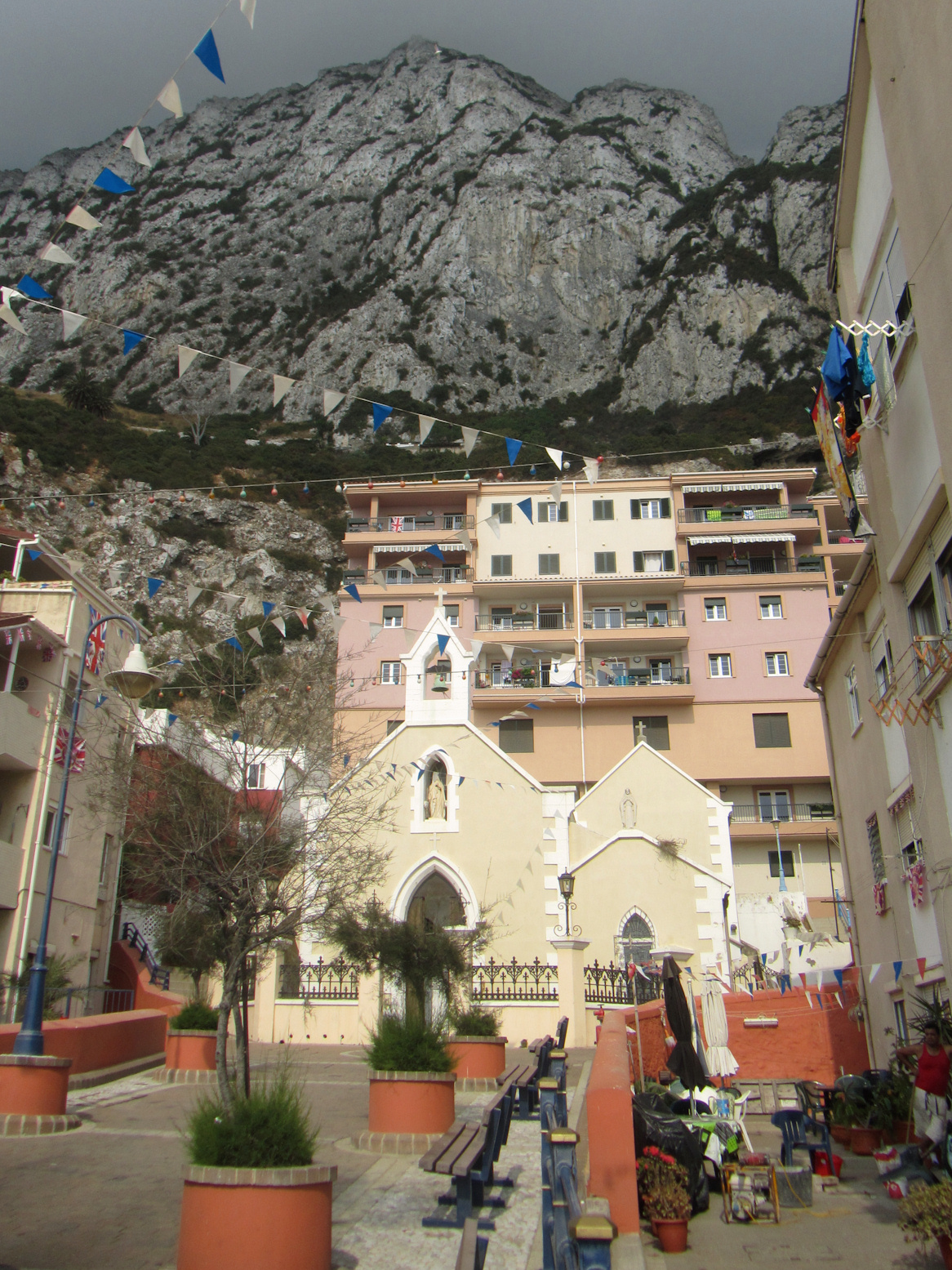
- Our Lady of Sorrows Church
- 36.111322°N 5.348314°W
- Location: 32, Catalan Bay
- Country: Gibraltar
- Denomination: Roman Catholic

Our Lady of Sorrows Church is a Catholic church in Gibraltar. It is in the heart of the old village at Catalan Bay (La Caleta), overlooking the sea.

The Church's statue of Our Lady of Sorrows is carried in procession to the Catalan Bay beach each September when the Bishop of Gibraltar blesses the sea in the village's main religious festival.
