= Caleta Hotel =

Hotel in Gibraltar

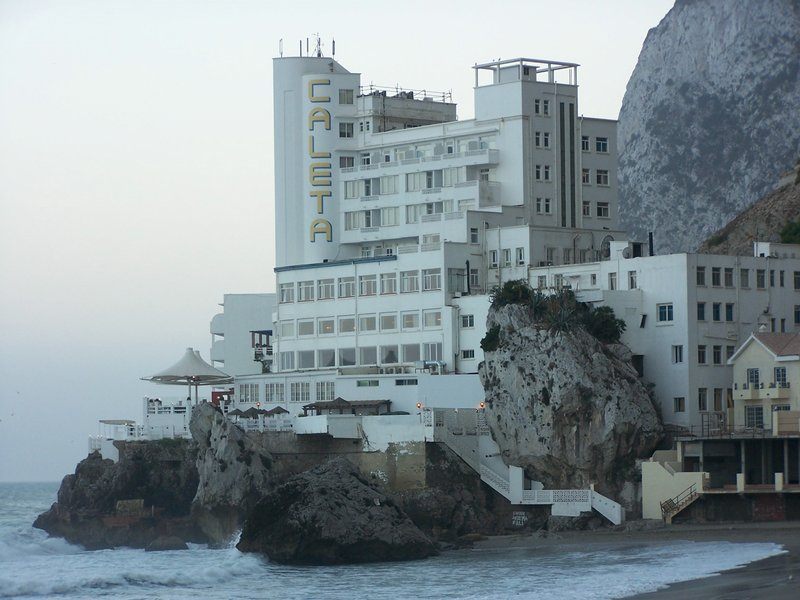

- Location within Gibraltar

General information
- Location: Catalan Bay, Gibraltar
- Coordinates: 36°8′15.15″N 5°20′27.39″W

Website
- caletahotel.com

The Caleta Hotel, also known as Caleta Palace Hotel, was a four star hotel in the British Overseas Territory of Gibraltar. It was located at Catalan Bay on the east coast of the territory overlooking the Mediterranean Sea. It owed its name to La Caleta (Catalan for "Small Cove"), the traditional name given from the Spanish period to Catalan Bay and the fishing village located in its shore. The Caleta Hotel carried guest rooms and suites.

The hotel received Gibraltar's Leading Hotel Award on four occasions, from 2009 to 2012, at the World Travel Awards.

In 2021 the hotel was closed permanently, and demolished in 2022.

== Location ==
The Caleta Palace Hotel was in Gibraltar, the British Overseas Territory at the southern end of the Iberian Peninsula. It was located at Catalan Bay, a small bay and fishing village, on the eastern side of The Rock. Catalan Bay is located separate from Gibraltar's main town and overlooks the Mediterranean Sea.

== History ==
The hotel was built in 1964 and received funds from the Government of Gibraltar in 1972 under its Hotel Development Aid Programme to increase the total beds capacity of hotel by over 100.

== Amenities ==
The hotel operated one Italian restaurant and had guest rooms and suites. Nunos Italian Restaurant received two rosettes by The Automobile Association. The Caleta Hotel earned the Gibraltar's Leading Hotel Award consecutively from 2009 to 2012. The award is presented at the World Travel Awards, an annual award ceremony which acknowledges and rewards across all sectors of the tourism industry. The award was previously won by The Rock Hotel from 2004 to 2008.

The hotel also had a spa, outdoor grill, business centre and café.
