= Royal Gibraltar Yacht Club =

- Burgee

- Ensign
- Short name: RGYC
- Founded: 1829
- Location: Gibraltar Harbour, Gibraltar
- Website: https://www.rgyc.gi/

The Royal Gibraltar Yacht Club, formerly the Gibraltar Yacht Club, was established by officers of the Royal Navy in 1829. It was one of the first yacht clubs founded outside of Britain. British monarchs and Gibraltarian governors have been patrons of the club; the first visit by a reigning monarch was in 1954. During the latter twentieth century, the naval presence waned and the membership of locals dominated. The club's sailing school was established in 2001, accredited as a teaching facility in 2004, and became a testing centre in 2010. The reclamation projects in the middle section of Gibraltar Harbour necessitated the club's move from 26 Queensway to temporary premises. A new facility is under construction.

== History ==
Ensign of the Royal Gibraltar Yacht Club

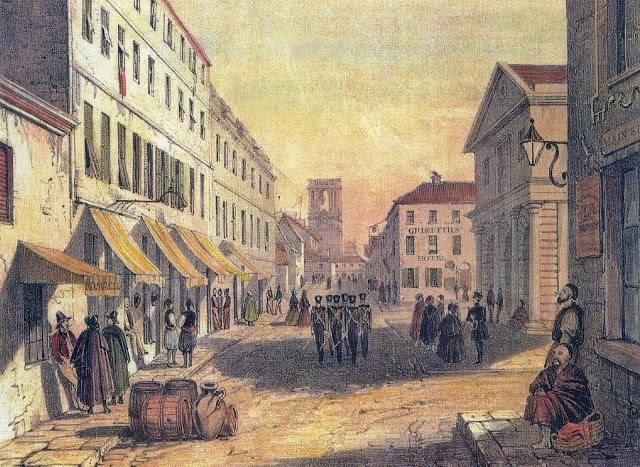
The first meeting of the Gibraltar Yacht Club took place at the Griffiths Hotel.

The Gibraltar Yacht Club was established in 1829 in the British overseas territory of Gibraltar by officers of the Royal Navy stationed at the garrison. It was one of the first yacht clubs to be founded outside of Britain; the Singapore Yacht Club was established three years earlier. The first mention of a meeting of the club appeared in the Gibraltar Chronicle on 15 July 1829: "The members of the Gibraltar Yacht Club will hold a meeting at Griffiths Hotel on Friday 17th instant at 1 o’ clock p. m. when any officers of the Garrison wishing to join the club are requested to attend." The first meeting of the yacht club took place at the Griffiths Hotel in Commercial Square, now referred to as John Mackintosh Square and, colloquially, as the Piazza. Later, gatherings of the membership were at the Garrison Library. At the end of the nineteenth century, the club relocated to Gibraltar Harbour, near King's Bastion. During the late nineteenth century, those who wanted to register their yachts with the Gibraltar Yacht Club required approval of the Governor of Gibraltar.

While the earliest records of the yacht club have been lost, the club does have in its custody a notice of 27 October 1837 from the Admiralty to the Governor. In it, a warrant grants the members of the club permission to fly a "St. George’s or White Ensign and a cornet or burgee." A letter of 22 July 1842 then revokes that permission and instead authorizes wearing of the Blue Ensign.

The first regatta for which records exist is that of 22 July 1893. In addition to sailing, the schedule for that day featured swimming, water polo, rowing, and the greasy pole. In 1910, King George V, then the Prince of Wales, gave to the club a cup, now referred to as the King's Cup, for an annual sailing competition. The next year, the prince became the club's patron. More than two decades later, on 13 October 1933, the king bestowed the title "Royal" upon the Gibraltar Yacht Club. The first visit by a reigning monarch was in May 1954, as the then patron Queen Elizabeth II and her husband Prince Philip, Duke of Edinburgh visited the club after arriving in Gibraltar on the royal yacht HMY Britannia. Prince Philip continues to be a member of the club. Membership in the club during its early years was limited to officers of the Royal Navy, and the Governor of Gibraltar was consistently one of its patrons. Other amusements afforded to the officers included the Royal Calpe Hunt and the Garrison Library.

Over the course of the nineteenth century, there was a marked increase in the number of yacht clubs in the British Empire. While it was due in part to an increase in wealth of the middle class, the social prestige associated with sailing was a factor, particularly given the association with royalty, and its promotion by Queen Victoria and Prince Albert. The percentage of Gibraltarians in the yacht club increased slowly during the nineteenth century. However, during the latter part of the twentieth century, as the presence of the Royal Navy waned, the membership of locals increased more substantially. January 1991 marked the start of Europa 92, billed as the world's first "around the world rally," the first race of small yachts around the world. During the week prior to the start of the race, the Royal Gibraltar Yacht Club gave all the participants temporary membership privileges and served as the hosting club.

== Twenty-first century ==
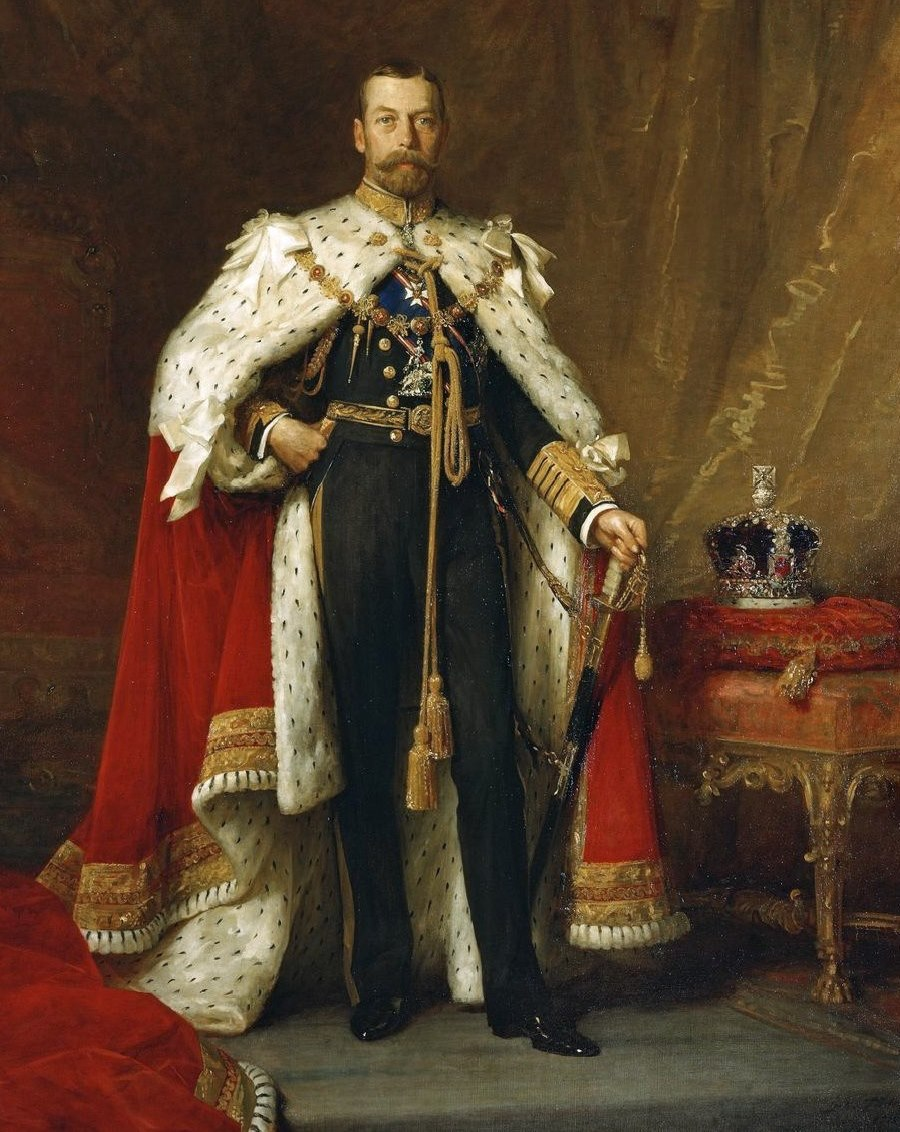
King George V bestowed the title "Royal" upon the Gibraltar Yacht Club in 1933.

The primary mission of the Royal Gibraltar Yacht Club is to promote sailing in the Gibraltar area. The organisation uses Victory Class yachts and 420s; it has 17 of the Victory Class yachts. Sailors compete for a total of 21 trophies during the course of the season, from May to October. The King's Cup is the most desirable trophy, awarded for the best performance of the season in Victory Class vessels. The United Kingdom's R.A.F. Sailing Association competes annually at the club. The Tango Laser Open is the final club competition of the summer and is held annually. It includes a competition for adults that is also open to non-club members. This draws a large number of competitors from Spain such as the yacht club of La Línea, across the border.

The fifteenth annual Gibraltar Regatta was organised by the Royal Gibraltar Yacht Club and sponsored by Beck's and the Gibraltar Sports and Leisure Authority. The event took place in the Bay of Gibraltar on the weekend of the 29th through 31 July 2011. Participants registered in one of four divisions, with awards given to the first three vessels in each division. An additional award was given to the vessel with the shortest elapsed time in the "Round the Rock" competition. In 2012, the Gibraltar Regatta was held the weekend of 28 and 29 July.

The club's sailing academy was founded in May 2001 and, in 2004, it was credentialed by the Royal Yachting Association (RYA) as a teaching facility. The Teaching Centre is staffed by volunteers and financially supported by the yacht club. Lessons run from March to November, and are available to both members and nonmembers of the RGYC. Neophytes take a one-week introductory course during the summer, with three such weeks available every year. In 2004, the club also became an RYA training facility for powerboating. Six years later, in 2010, the club became an ICC testing centre for both sailing and powerboating. Registrants can earn an International Certificate of Competence.

The eleventh annual Gibraltar Day was held in London on 18 October 2010. The front cover of the twelve page brochure distributed to those attending Gibraltar Day featured a colour photograph of Victory Class vessels of the Royal Gibraltar Yacht Club in the Bay of Gibraltar. The club participated in the 2011 Festival of the Seas, a fundraiser.

December 2008 was the last time that club members were able to set sail from the club. In early 2009, sand dredged from the seabed along the east side of Gibraltar was utilised to reclaim land in front of the yacht club. The project has been referred to as the Rooke reclamation or mid-harbour reclamation. The club relocated from 26 Queensway to temporary premises at 2 Queensway after the reclamation. Temporary mooring sites for the club were built behind what had been a Ministry of Defence health facility. The construction company Profield Contractors won the contract to construct a new club house and associated facilities on Coaling Island. In July 2011, it was announced that the government had included £1.5 million in the year's budget for relocation of the club. Their new location on Coaling Island was formerly a Ministry of Defence site for the Boat Squadron. In 2012, the Government of Gibraltar solicited bids for the "Proposed Marine Works at the New Royal Gibraltar Yacht Club Phase 1, Sea Scouts and Duke of Edinburgh facilities."
