= Dudley Ward Way =

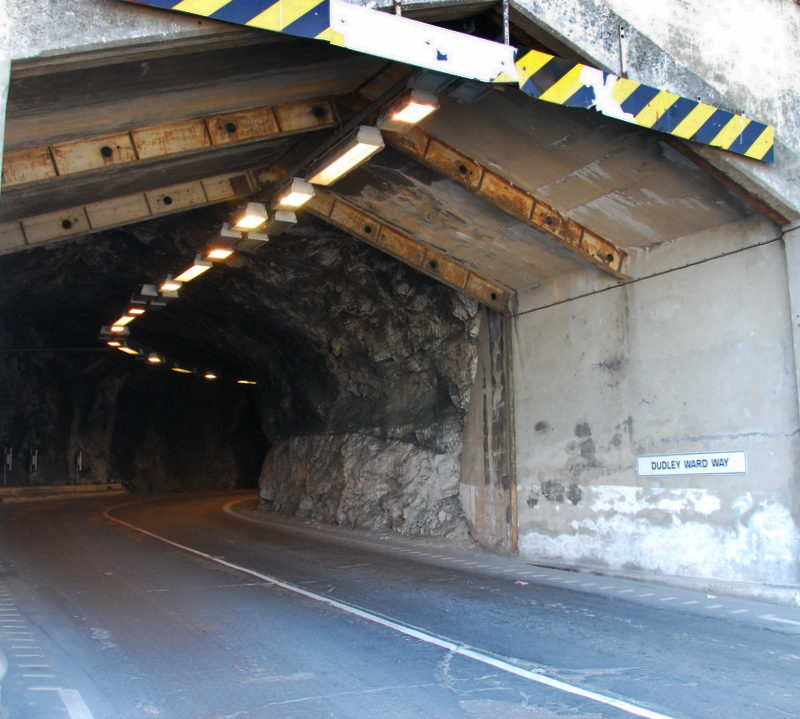
- Southern entrance to Dudley Ward Way
- Interactive map of Dudley Ward Way

Overview
- Location: Gibraltar
- Coordinates: 36.125346°N 5.341174°W
- Status: Open
- Start: Brian Navarro Way
- End: Europa Advance Road (Europa Point)

Operation
- Closed: February 18, 2002
- Rebuilt: 2010
- Reopened: November 2, 2010
- Owner: Government of Gibraltar
- Operator: Government of Gibraltar
- Traffic: Automotive
- Character: Public highway
- Toll: Nil

Technical
- Length: 0.5 kilometres (0.31 mi)
- No. of lanes: 2
- Operating speed: 40 kilometres per hour (25 mph)
- Width: 7 metres (23 ft)

Dudley Ward Way is a road tunnel through the south-eastern part of the Rock of Gibraltar. It is named after Sir Alfred Dudley Ward, Governor of Gibraltar from 8 June 1962 to 5 August 1965. The road running through the tunnel links the eastern side of The Rock (including Catalan Bay and Sandy Bay) via Sir Herbert Miles Road, with Europa Point, at the southern tip of Gibraltar via Europa Advance Road.

== Opening ==
Dudley Ward Way was built during the 1956–1968 period by the British Army. After the end of military tunnelling and the departure of the Royal Engineer tunnellers the maintenance of the tunnel was transferred to the civilian authorities.

== Closure ==
Following a rockfall on 18 February 2002 at the approach road to the tunnel from the North, which killed Gibraltarian Brian Navarro while he was travelling by car and exiting the tunnel, the Government of Gibraltar concluded that the risk of further such incidents was too great, and the tunnel was closed indefinitely.

== Reopening ==
In 2007, its reopening was suggested by the Government in order to ease traffic flow in the area of the new Rosia residential developments. Works on the stabilisation of The Rock's cliff began in summer 2009 and the tunnel reopened to traffic on 2 November 2010. To commemorate Brian Navarro, who was killed following a rockfall at the approach road to the tunnel, a plaque was placed at the site and the section of road, from the Admiralty Tunnel entrance in Sandy Bay to Dudley Ward Way's northern entrance, renamed Brian Navarro Way.

The total cost to the Government of the works to reopen the tunnel was £10.6 million.
