= Gibraltar Cruise Terminal =

Passenger ship terminal in Gibraltar

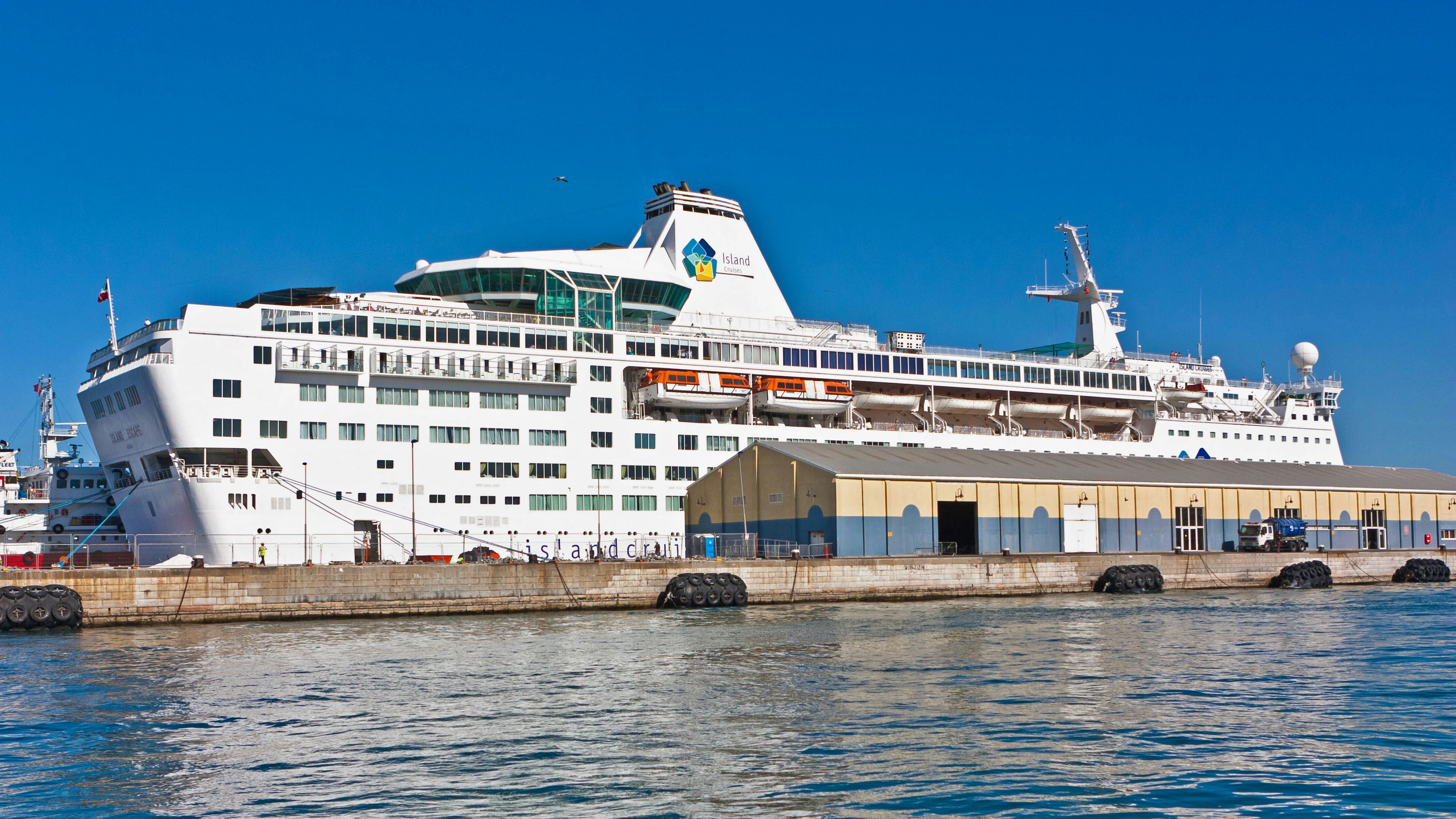
- Island Cruises' Island Escape berthed alongside the Gibraltar Cruise Terminal at the Western Arm of the North Mole, Gibraltar Harbour
- Interactive map of the Gibraltar Cruise Terminal area

General information
- Location: Western Arm of North Mole, Gibraltar Harbour, Gibraltar
- Coordinates: 36.147591°N 5.365775°W
- Opened: 17 July 1997
- Cost: £600,000
- Owner: Government of Gibraltar

Technical details
- Floor area: 1,200 Square Metres

Design and construction
- Architect: Dennis Mosquera
- Main contractor: Profield Contractors

The Gibraltar Cruise Terminal is located at the northern end of the Western Arm of the North Mole at Gibraltar Harbour. Construction of the facility in the British Overseas Territory of Gibraltar was completed in 1997. In the fifteen years since its opening, the terminal handled approximately three million cruise passengers. In May 2011, the explosion of a sullage tank on the Western Arm, while a cruise ship was berthed nearby, ultimately resulted in the loss of life of a dock worker. In October 2011, the Government of Gibraltar announced plans for expansion and renovation of the cruise terminal.

== Design ==
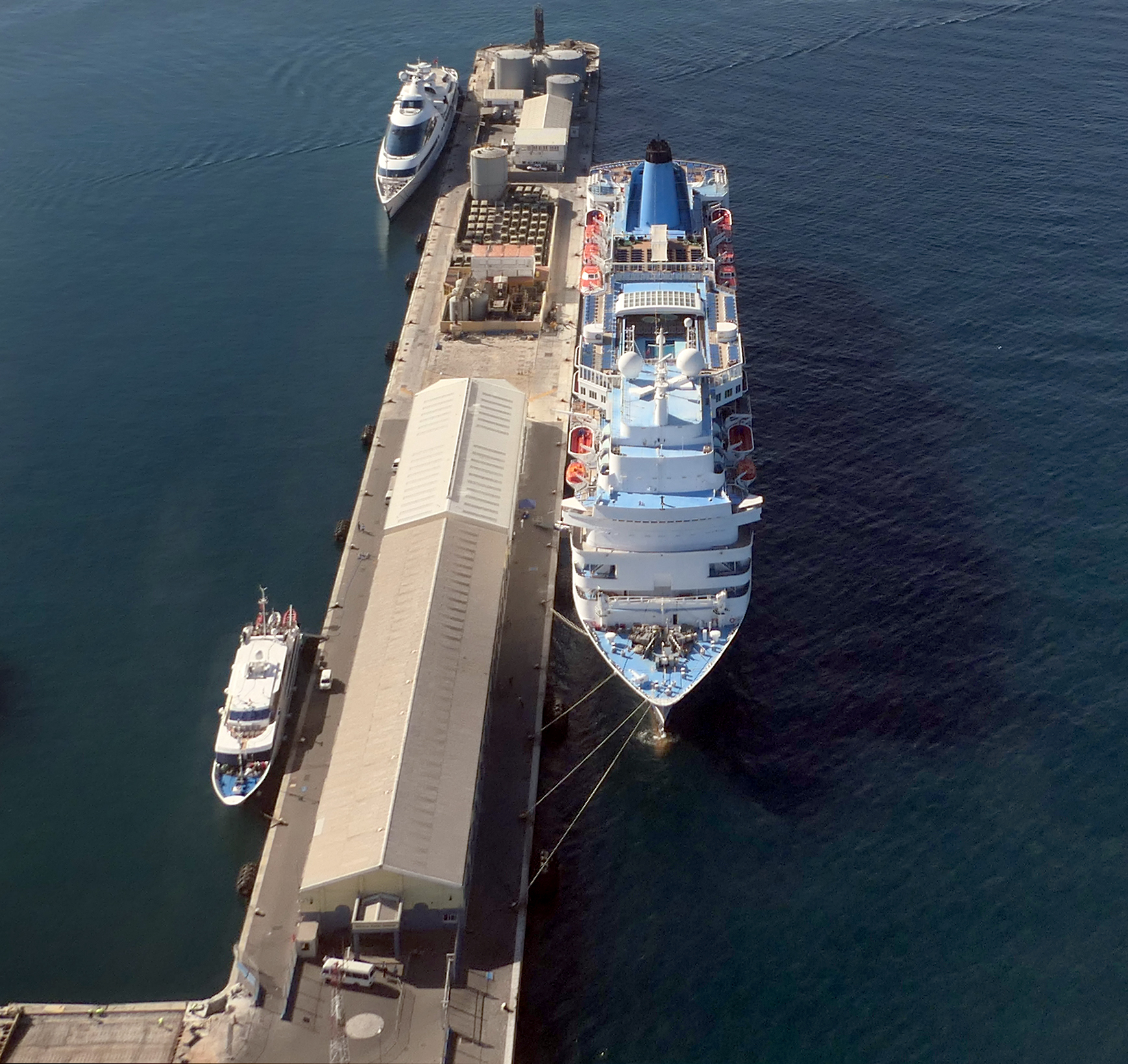
An aerial view

In 1995, the Government of Gibraltar solicited bids for the design and construction of a new cruise terminal in the British Overseas Territory of Gibraltar. Eleven companies submitted bids for the project. Gibraltarian architect Dennis Mosquera was selected to design the terminal, and the company Profield Contractors was chosen to build it. The architect and builders worked within a limited budget of £600,000. The cruise terminal building was originally a warehouse on the Western Arm of the North Mole of Gibraltar Harbour. While unused, the walls of the former warehouse were deemed to be structurally sound. The building was gutted, and given a new floor and insulated roof. Walls of white, chipped stone were installed. The overall effect was one of airiness and a neoclassical appearance. The colour scheme used shades of blue and yellow, sunny Mediterranean colours. The terminal was further decorated with plants, art with a nautical motif, and lighting.

== Security ==
The public and restricted areas of the cruise terminal are separated by a security barrier. The public sections of the terminal have telephone and fax equipment, as well as counters for car rentals, taxis, and tourist information. This area of the terminal also has general seating, an arts and crafts store, and a cafeteria/bar. The lounge in the restricted zone features a fountain, and the walls of that area are complemented by the works of Gibraltar artists. Access to the restricted section of the cruise terminal is similar to that of an airport. There are x-ray machines and metal detectors, as well as Gibraltar Customs and other officials. The measures employed were based on recommendations made by Scotland Yard personnel. Security is not limited to the terminal; access to Gibraltar Harbour is restricted. In addition to security on the land side of the harbour, the waters are patrolled by a combination of Gibraltar Port Authority, Royal Gibraltar Police, and Ministry of Defence (Gibraltar Defence Police and Royal Navy) vessels.

== First fifteen years ==
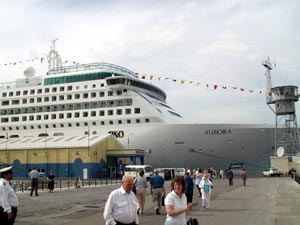
MV Aurora (2000) moored adjacent to the Gibraltar Cruise Terminal

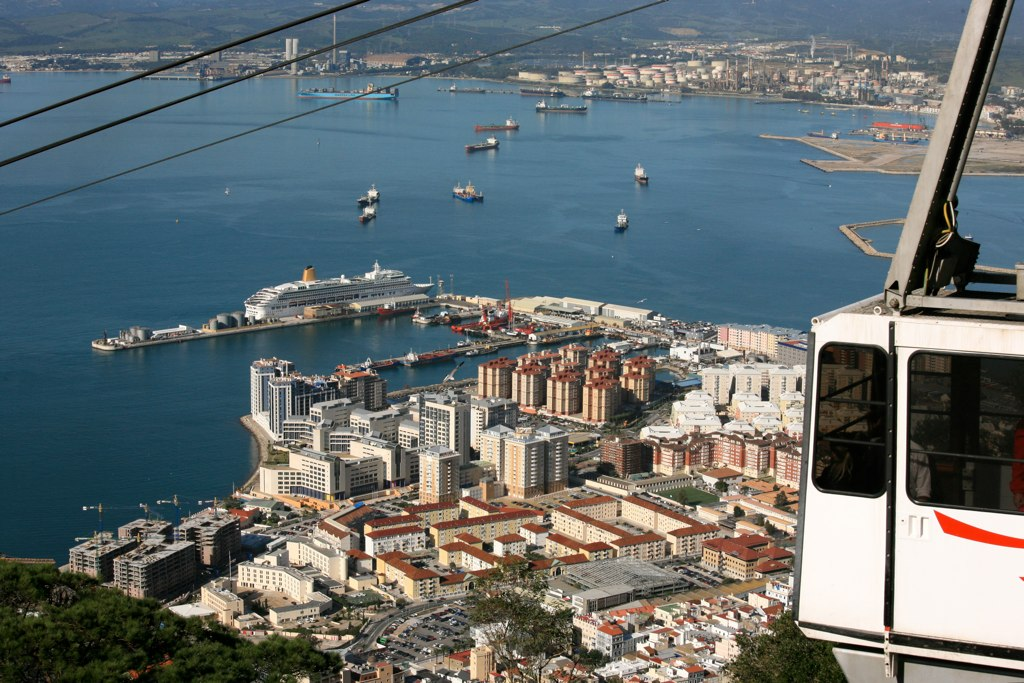
Gibraltar Cruise Port (2010) from cable car

The Gibraltar Cruise Terminal opened on 17 July 1997. Cruise ships berth along both sides of the terminal at the northern end of the Western Arm of the North Mole. 940 metres (3,080 ft) of quay length are available on the North Mole for cruise ships, permitting a total of two large or four medium-sized ships to dock along both sides of the Western Arm. If necessary, more berths can be made available for vessels at other locations in the harbour. On 15 June 2005, the terminal celebrated its one millionth passenger, Sandra Young of the United Kingdom. The Gibraltar Tourist Board made it an event, with a band, honour guard, VIP tour, and luncheon. In addition, the passenger from the Sea Princess, accompanied by her husband, received numerous gifts from a variety of Gibraltar companies and organisations.

The cruise terminal has been acknowledged with awards, including two by Dream World Cruise Destinations in 2003 and 2008. Following a severe storm that battered the building in October 2008, the terminal was renovated in time for the 2009 cruise season. The terminal handled approximately three million cruise ship passengers in the fifteen years since the opening in 1997. Passenger traffic almost doubled over that period. Gibraltar ranks fourth in cruise ports on the Iberian Peninsula, after Barcelona, Spain; Lisbon, Portugal; and Málaga, Spain.

== Explosion on the North Mole ==
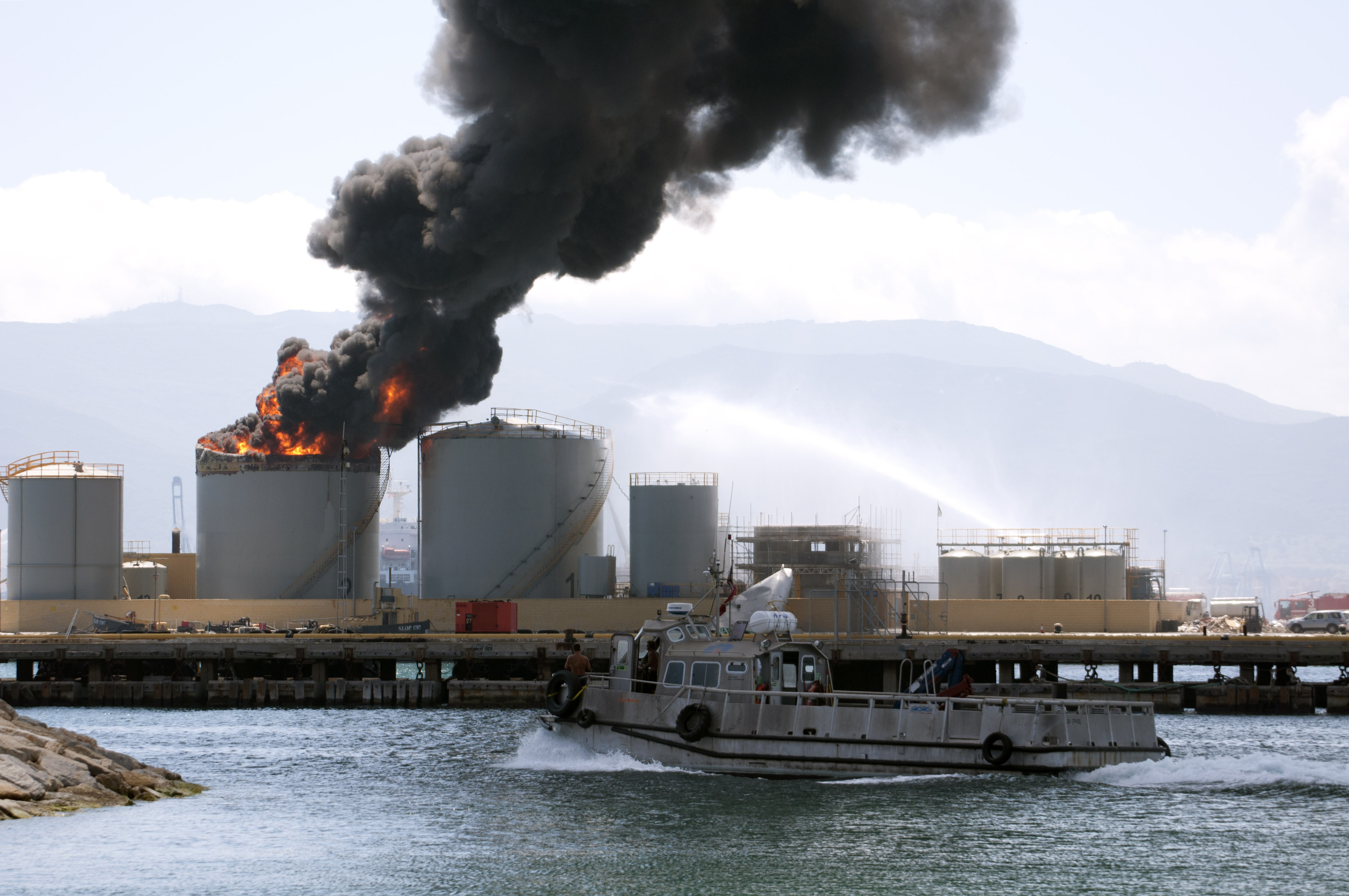
After the explosion at North Mole (2011)

On 31 May 2011, a dozen passengers aboard the Independence of the Seas received injuries, most minor, after the explosion of a sullage tank that contained water and used oil. The Royal Caribbean International cruise ship had been docked at the cruise terminal on the North Mole, and the blast was believed to have occurred as the result of a spark from welding operations on the tank that was also positioned on the Western Arm of the North Mole. Immediately following the explosion, the vessel moved away from the breakwater. There was no substantial damage to the cruise ship. Spanish dock workers that had been welding the tank, and a policeman, were also injured, one of them seriously. The explosion resulted in a fire that raged for hours and spread to an adjacent tank. Thick, black smoke from the blaze necessitated suspension of flights at Gibraltar International Airport.

One of the dock workers, 40-year-old Pedro Zambrano Lopez from La Línea de la Concepción, sustained extensive burns. He was stabilised at St Bernard's Hospital, and was transferred to the Virgen del Rocío Hospital in Seville, Spain. He died on 3 August 2011 due to complications of the injuries he suffered. The incident on the North Mole led to multiple investigations, primarily of procedures at Nature Port Reception Facilities Ltd, at whose plant the explosion occurred. The investigations were conducted privately on behalf of Capita Symonds, a consultancy company based in the United Kingdom, whose study of the explosion was commissioned by the Government of Gibraltar. Nature Port, on the other hand, pointed out that the Capita Symonds investigations were private and incomplete, and failed to address the inadequate emergency response at the time of the explosion and fire, and hired its own investigators. The company also demanded "an independent public inquiry into all aspects of the incident." Nature Port commissioned its own investigation of the emergency response, which found "serious failings on the part of the port and emergency services."

The Capita Symonds reports indicated that the explosion was due to holes in the tank rooftops secondary to corrosion. The perforations permitted the escape of flammable vapour, which was then ignited during the welding operations. While Capita Symonds did not address the issue of the emergency response to the explosion, it did address the advisability of having a sullage plant near a cruise terminal. "The concept of having a processing plant in the current location is potentially hazardous and high risk, made more so due to the presence of low flashpoint products." In addition, just five months before the explosion, Nature Port received permission to expand their facility northward and paid over £300,000 for additional land. Their licence to operate on the breakwater was suspended after the incident.

== Future expansion ==
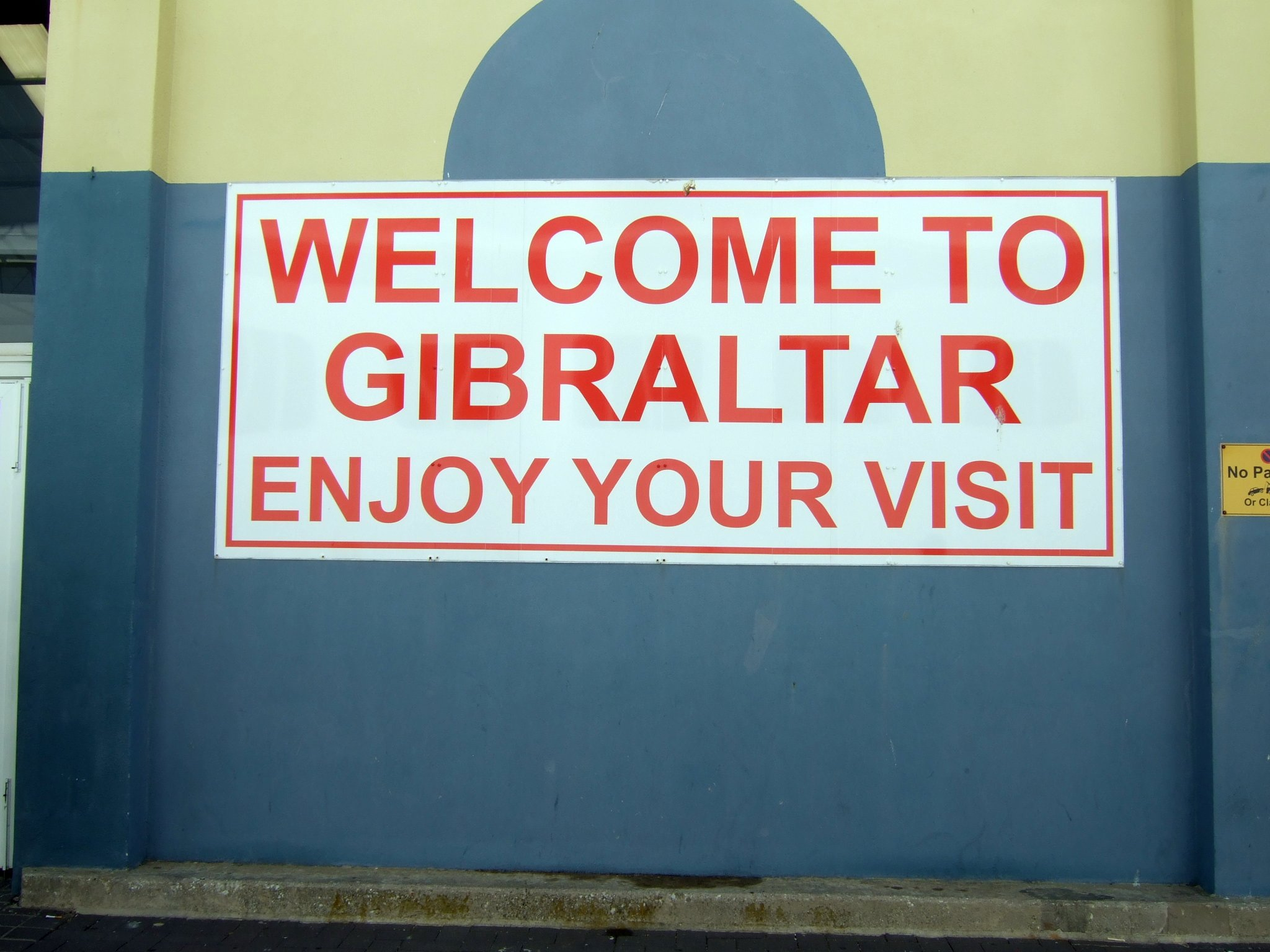
Welcome sign at the cruise terminal

On 5 October 2011, the Government of Gibraltar announced the planned expansion of the cruise terminal. Their stated goal is to permit The Rock to accommodate larger cruise ships at the commercial port, as well as an increase in the number of passengers. The government also wishes to meet the needs of a variety of passengers. In addition to those customers for whom Gibraltar is a stop on their itinerary, the updated terminal and associated facilities will accommodate those who join or leave the vessel in Gibraltar, "partial turnaround" passengers. The first phase of the expansion will entail demolition of an adjacent structure, the former Ice Box Building, which has recently been used by M H Bland & Co. This will make available an additional 800 square metres (8,600 ft^{2}), increasing the facility from 1,200 square metres (13,000 ft^{2}) to 2,000 square metres (22,000 ft^{2}). The terminal will then be completely renovated.

The expanded cruise terminal will feature an enlarged arrival area. That section of the building will include an information screen, seating, and an area for the Gibraltar Tourist Board. The portion of the terminal dedicated to security and immigration will be doubled in size, with separation of the areas serving the two sides of the Western Arm. New stairs and an elevator for the disabled will lead to a new mezzanine level with a cafeteria. The colour scheme inside the terminal will be changed to sand and terracotta. The exterior of the facility will also receive a new paint job, which will include a "Welcome to Gibraltar" sign on the roof of the building. The renovation will be completed with resurfacing of the Western Arm.
