= Catalan Bay =

Bay and fishing village in Gibraltar

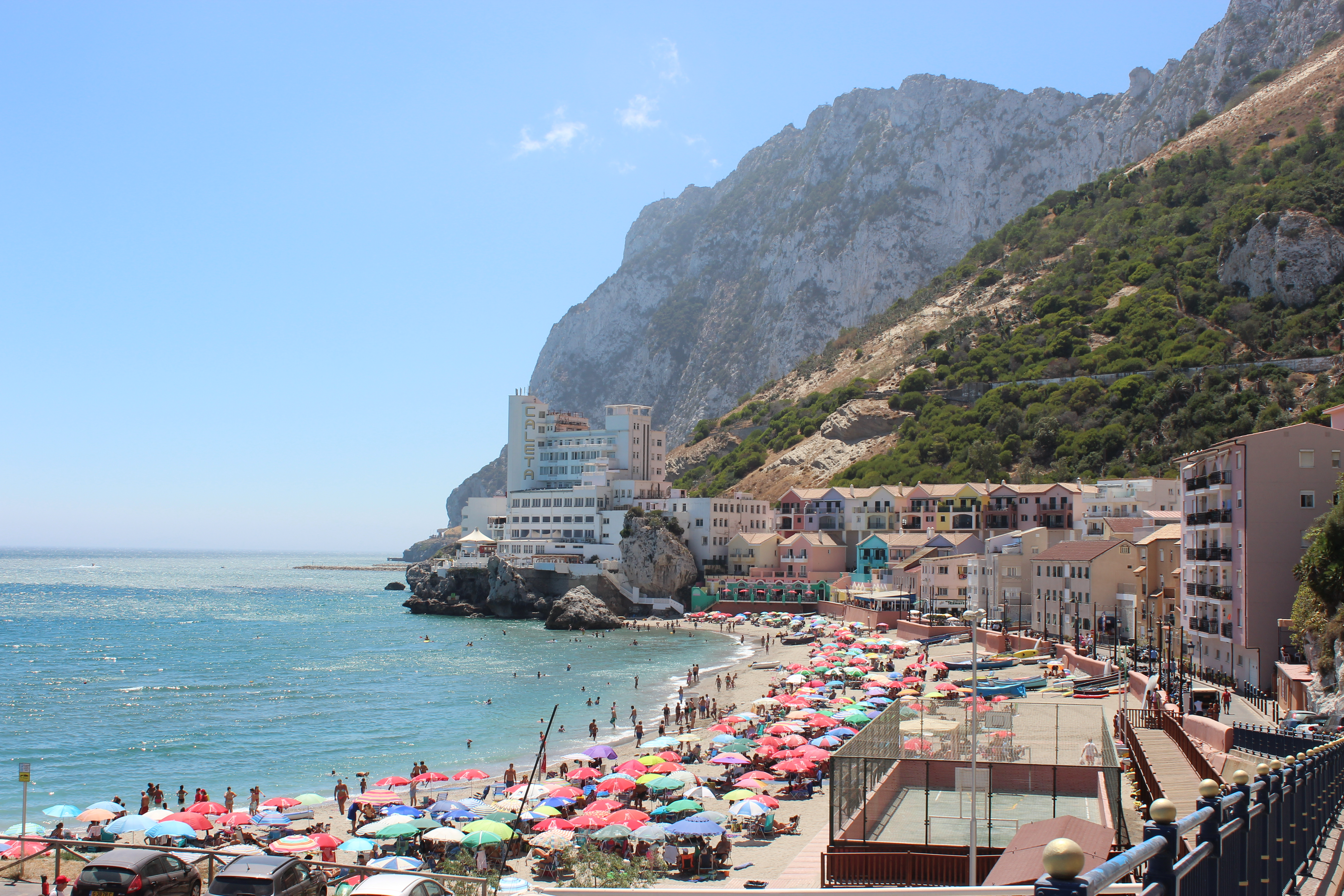
- View of Catalan Bay looking South
- Interactive map of Catalan Bay

Location
- Country: Gibraltar
- Location: Gibraltar
- Coordinates: 36.13875°N 5.34128°W

Details
- Owned by: Government of Gibraltar
- Type of harbour: Natural

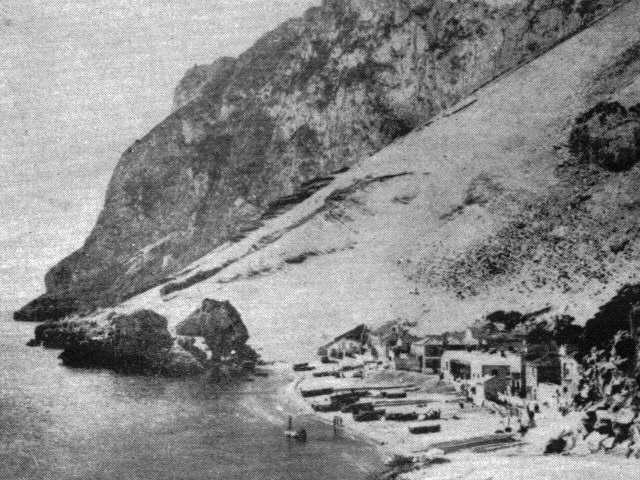
Early view of Catalan Bay looking south from the top of the access road - late nineteenth century. The round shaped rock which juts out into the sea is commonly known as la mamela (Catalan: la mamella, the breast), the name given to it by the early Catalan settlers as it resembles a woman's breast when viewed from the shore.

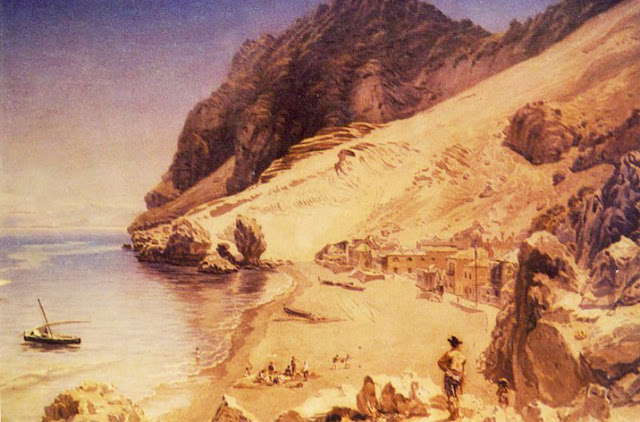
Nineteenth-century painting of Catalan Bay looking south by Thomas Colman Dibdin

Catalan Bay (Spanish: La Caleta) is a bay and fishing village in Gibraltar, on the eastern side of The Rock away from Westside.

== Etymology ==
Although the origin of Catalan Bay's name is documented, a couple of theories co-exist. Documentary evidence suggests that the bay is named after a group of around 350 Catalan servicemen believed to have settled there after having assisted the Anglo-Dutch forces who captured Gibraltar during the War of Spanish Succession on 4 August 1704. Evidence supports the theory that Catalans settled in Catalan Bay giving rise to the above etymological definition.

The name La Caleta (meaning 'small bay or cove') considerably pre-dates that of Catalan Bay. The fishing villages of La Atunara (La Línea de la Concepción, Spain) and La Caleta are mentioned in a Royal Dispatch of 6 March 1634, being under the jurisdiction of the "Tercio del Mar de Marbella y Estepona" in the Kingdom of Granada. Since it has been called La Caleta for much longer than it has been called Catalan Bay. The first mention of Catalan Bay was probably, at least, in the mid-eighteenth century, between the second and third siege of Gibraltar (1727-1779). It already appeared on William Faden's map (dressed in 1769-1775 and published in 1782), or in John Cheevers's map (1785). Before that, it probably was named "Catalan Battery", "Catalan Beach" or "Playa de los Catalanes".

In 1704, during the capture of Gibraltar by an Anglo-Dutch combined operation, an expedition landed there of around 350 Catalans followers of Charles of Austria and commanded by Prince Georg von Hessen Darmstadt (Catalonia's deputy and delegate of Charles of Austria) and general Joan Baptista Basset. They most likely came to Gibraltar in at least five ships, as among the lists of Catalan expeditionaries there are five vessel owners (from Arenys de Mar, Barcelona, Cubelles, Mataró, and Sant Feliu de Guixols). The Catalans formed two companies, an artillery company (called "Catalan Battery") and an infantry company of mountain fusiliers (called "Catalan Company of Miquelets",commanded by captain Jaume Burguy). Both protected the isthmus of Gibraltar and attacked mountain areas of the Rock against Spanish grenadiers. Some of the surnames of the Catalans who participated in the conquest are: Andreu, Armenter, Auger, Basset, Bertran, Besart, Boix, Bonavida, Bosch, Burguy, Canovas, Caramany, Carreras, Casamitjana, Castells, Cateura, Clavell, Constans, Corrons, Cortès, Esplugas, Estanyol, Estaper, Esteve, Fabregas, Ferrer, Fonollós, Fontanet, Freixes, Frutó, Gil, Goy, Llofriu, Llopis, Martí, Massana, Matalonga, Mulet, Navarro, Nebot, Oliver, Ortas, Pausà, Pi, Pons, Pujol, Rabassa, Ribas, Roca, Rossell, Roset, Rovira, Ruaix, Salvat, Sanromà, Serrallonga, Siurana, Soler, Trebó, Trias, Trullàs, Vidal, Virolà, Viudes.

Subsequently, the conquest, some of these Catalan soldiers settled in Gibraltar, after the departure of the majority of troops used in the conquest, and helped establish the first military checkpoint of Gibraltar. The Catalan Alfons de la Capella, lawyer of the Royal Council of Catalonia, became a judge in Gibraltar. The Catalan Josep Corrons was appointed Alcaide of the Sea (responsible for the harbour) and later was appointed Sergeant Major of Gibraltar. The Catalan Andreu Martí (one of the first to take the stronghold of the port in the conquest of the Rock) was responsible for directing the work of the prisoners after the conquest. The Catalan Jeroni Fàbregas was responsible for the distribution of ammunition.

In the 1705 siege, the Catalan soldiers fought again in defence of Gibraltar, especially in an area then called "Catalan Guard" or "Catalan Post" in Wolf's Leap (Johann Argathelu map at first third of the eighteenth century, Gabriel Bodenehr map 1720, Johann Bowles brothers map 1727, etc.).

In 1709, Catalan Josep Valls, a Gibraltar resident, collaborating with Catalan traders Salvador Feliu de la Penya, Joan Verivol, Josep Grasses, and Josep Boigues, created a commercial company called "Companyia Nova de Gibraltar" (New Company of Gibraltar), in order to replace the monopoly of Cádiz in ocean trade, that would endure until 1723. Another theory suggests that the latter could simply be an English mispronunciation of Caleta.

== History ==
Historically, Catalan Bay had been populated by Genoese fishermen who were part of a much larger settlement pattern along the eastern coast of The Rock during the seventeenth and eighteenth centuries. In the eighteenth century Genoese was so widely spoken in Gibraltar that government notices were also published in this language (alongside English and Spanish). Genoese was spoken in La Caleta well into the nineteenth century, dying out in the early decades of the twentieth. There has been some discussion about the possibility that the British may have mixed up Catalans with Genoese but, according to some opinions, it is by no means clear why they would suffer such a confusion, especially since there is other evidence which demonstrates that the British were perfectly aware that the residents of La Caleta were Genoese: the orders for the siege of 1727 refer to this bay as the Genoese Cove and the eighteenth- and nineteenth-century censuses record large numbers of people born in Genoa, not in Catalonia. However, the seventeenth-century French map "Plan de Catalan Bay ou la Caleta" (now in the Bibliothèque Nationale de France), which showed houses and lists of the inhabitants living in Catalan Bay before the village was completely built, shows various Catalan surnames among its inhabitants (Borràs, Canovas, Estella, Fabre, Fava, Palmé, Sans, Serra, Vila) even though they were not a majority compared to Genoese surnames (only 12%). Therefore, there is documentary evidence that among the first inhabitants of Catalan Bay there were Catalans, despite the fact that they were few in number compared to the Genoese. Also, there is considerable evidence that during the seventeenth century Catalan fishermen travelled to the south of Spain every summer in order to fish for Boquerones or anchovie, which were quite plentiful in this part of the world. Their main base was at the mouth of the river Palmones, which is more or less opposite Gibraltar. It was an ideal place to beach their boats and salt their catch in readiness for taking back home at the end of the season. Among the Catalans who participated in the conquest of 1704 there were some fishermen.

During the nineteenth century only fishermen were permitted to live in Catalan Bay. They were required to have a fishing permit granted to them by the Governor and only a limited number of permits were issued. The families who live in the village today are mainly descendants of these Genoese fishermen, and are colloquially known as caleteños.

== Present ==
The beach at Catalan Bay, is the second biggest sandy beach in Gibraltar. It is very popular with both Gibraltarians and tourists, and can often become overcrowded during the summer months.

One of the few hazards that can call for red flags to be flown is to warn bathers of jellyfish. Occasionally jellyfish such as the Mauve Stinger can arrive in significant numbers. Catalan Bay is home to the Caleta Palace Hotel, a number of restaurants (specialising in fresh seafood) and the Catholic Church of Our Lady of Sorrows. The statue of Our Lady of Sorrows is carried in procession to the beach each September when the Bishop of Gibraltar blesses the sea in what has become the village's main religious festival.

To the north lies Eastern Beach, Gibraltar's largest and most popular sandy beach. Beyond Catalan Bay to the south is the nearby beach of Sandy Bay, where from 2002 the coast road ended due to the closure of Dudley Ward Tunnel for safety reasons, only reopening in late 2010.

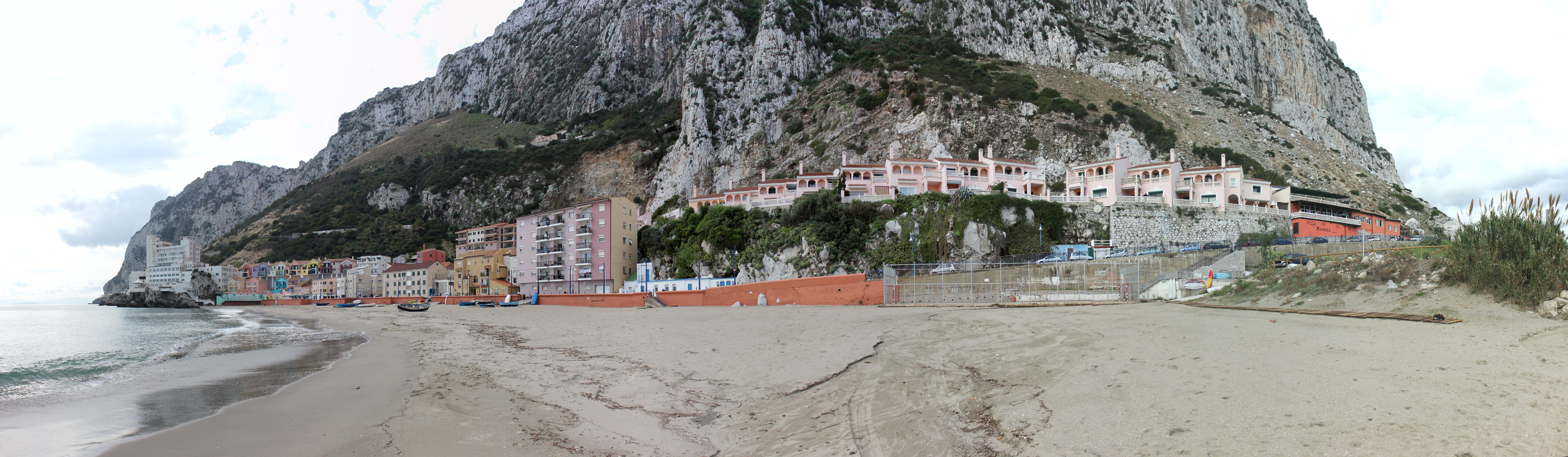
Panoramic view of Catalan Bay in 2012 with the Caleta Hotel in the extreme left

== See also ==
- Eastern Beach, Gibraltar
- Sandy Bay, Gibraltar
