= Eastern Beach, Gibraltar =

Settlement and beach in Gibraltar

Eastern Beach
- Beach
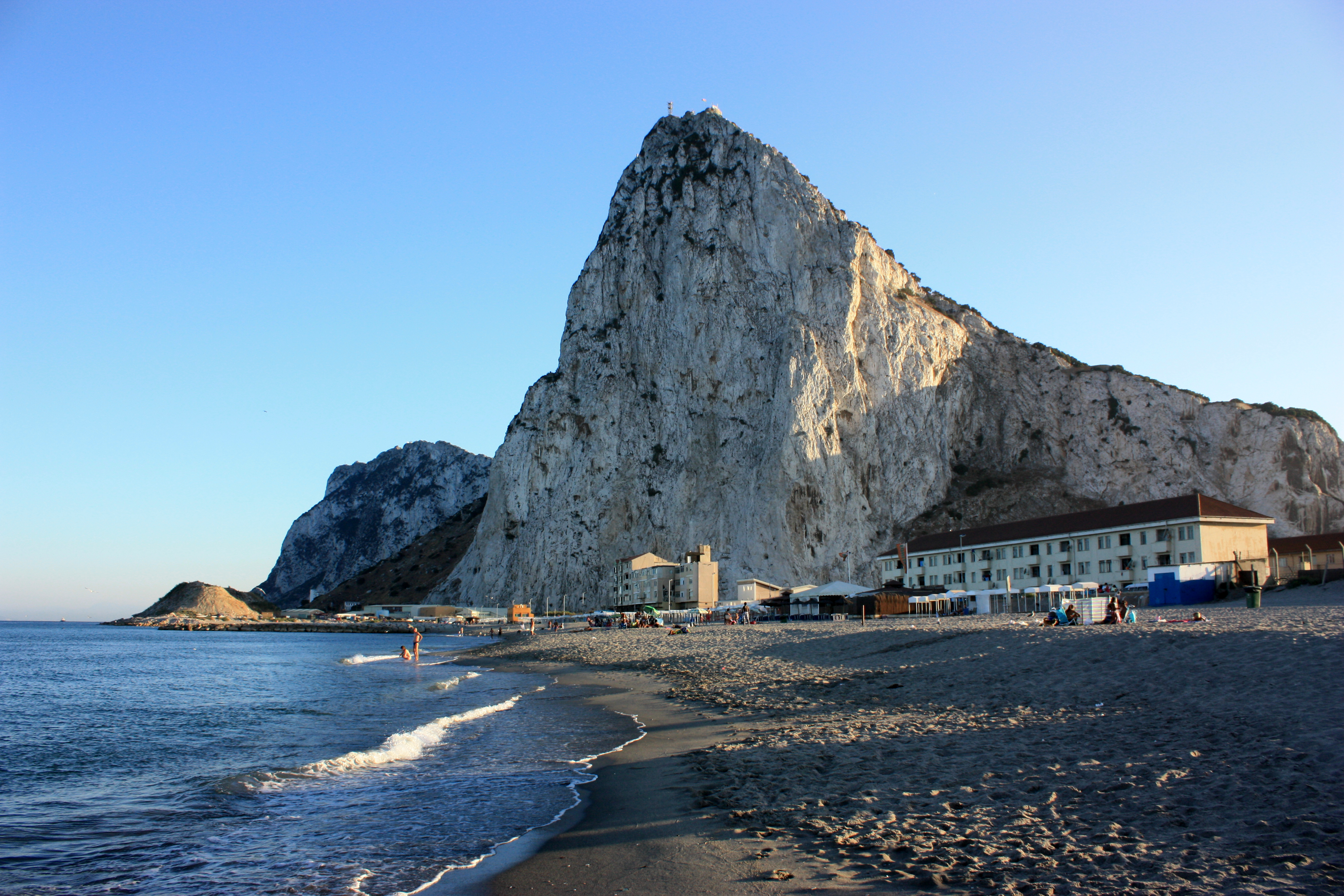
- View of the Rock of Gibraltar from the northern end of Eastern Beach, on the eastern Mediterranean coast of Gibraltar.
- Interactive map of Eastern Beach
- Coordinates: 36.14893°N 5.33978°W
- Location: Gibraltar

Dimensions
  - Length: 200 metres (660 ft)(approx.)
- Access: Eastern Beach Road

Eastern Beach is a sandy beach and settlement on the northeastern coast of the British Overseas Territory of Gibraltar. It is located on the isthmus which joins the Rock of Gibraltar to Spain. The beach extends from the north of Catalan Bay to the runway of Gibraltar International Airport near the Gibraltar-Spain border. Although only several hundred metres long it is the largest beach on The Rock.

The surrounding urban area is both residential and industrial. Unlike most of Gibraltar's other beaches, which are at times deprived of sunshine by the shadow of The Rock, Eastern Beach enjoys sunshine all day through until sunset.

One of the few hazards that can call for red flags to be flown is to warn bathers of jellyfish. Occasionally jellyfish such as the Mauve Stinger can arrive in significant numbers.

== See also ==
- Catalan Bay
- Sandy Bay, Gibraltar
