= List of lighthouses in Gibraltar =

Map of Gibraltar demonstrates the location of five lighthouses.

Most of the lighthouses in Gibraltar, the British Overseas Territory on the Iberian Peninsula, are located at Gibraltar Harbour. Perhaps the most notable exception is the Europa Point Lighthouse at Europa Point, a strategic location at the southern tip of the peninsula of Gibraltar. Prior to the opening of that lighthouse in 1841, sailors navigating the Strait of Gibraltar near Europa Point were dependent upon the light emitted by the Shrine of Our Lady of Europe. The sailors showed their gratitude and encouraged continued burning of the lights in the chapel and adjacent tower by leaving supplies of oil at the Roman Catholic shrine. While the shrine's tower is not listed in nautical publications, its history as an aid to navigation in earlier centuries is sufficiently well known that many consider it "Gibraltar's first lighthouse."

Aside from the aerobeacon on the Rock of Gibraltar and the lighthouse at Europa Point, all of the lighthouses in Gibraltar are located within the harbour. They may be divided into two groups: west and east. Those on the western boundary of the port are positioned in a roughly linear arrangement on the breakwaters (moles) that defend the western and northern sides of the harbour. The lighthouses at the "A" Head of the South Mole and "B" Head of the Detached Mole stand sentry over the south entrance to the port. Those at the "C" Head of the Detached Mole and "D" Head of the Western Arm of the North Mole guard the north entrance to the port. The lighthouse at the "E" Head (Elbow) of the North Mole also serves as a harbour control room. Lighthouses on the eastern boundary of the port are clustered near Coaling Island. While the Europa Point Lighthouse, also known as Victoria Tower, opened in the mid nineteenth century, the remaining lighthouses are of more recent vintage, with the lighthouses on the moles present by 1916. In addition, while Victoria Tower is of classic British design, the other lighthouses have a more utilitarian appearance.

== List of lighthouses ==
All of the lighthouses listed in the table are recorded in one or more of the following four publications.

Publication 113, of the United States National Geospatial-Intelligence Agency (NGA), is also known as the List of Lights, Radio Aids, and Fog Signals. The NGA numbers, light characteristics, and coordinates listed below are from Publication 113, the exception the published coordinates for the aerobeacon, which are in error.

The Online List of Lights is the source of images with external links in the table.

The ARLHS World List of Lights (WLOL) is published by the Amateur Radio Lighthouse Society.

The Lighthouse Directory indicates that four of the lighthouses listed below strictly fit its criteria for a lighthouse, but included a fifth, the Gibraltar Aerobeacon, as the publishers felt that it was merited.

Admiralty numbers originate in Volume D (NP77) of the Admiralty List of Lights and Fog Signals, published by the United Kingdom Hydrographic Office. However, the Admiralty numbers listed below are from Publication 113, with two exceptions. The first is the light at Cormorant Camber and the second is the light at Coaling Island. Cormorant Camber is immediately adjacent to and east of Coaling Island. The light at Cormorant Camber from The Online List of Lights has the same Admiralty number (D 2450.7) as the light at Coaling Island from Publication 113. The light at Coaling Island from The Online List of Lights has a different Admiralty number (D 2451.5) than that at Coaling Island from Publication 113 (D 2450.7).

| Name | NGA Admiralty | Characteristic | Image | Coordinates | Location |
|---|---|---|---|---|---|
| Europa Point Lighthouse | 4220; D 2438 | Iso.W. 10s Oc.R. 10s F.R. | | 36°06.7′N 5°20.6′W | Europa Point |
| Gibraltar South Mole Lighthouse | 4224; D 2442 | Fl.W. 2s | Image | 36°08.1′N 5°21.8′W | "A" Head of South Mole, Gibraltar Harbour |
| Gibraltar Detached Mole ("B" Head) Lighthouse | 4228; D 2445 | Q.R. | | | "B" Head of Detached Mole, Gibraltar Harbour |
| Gibraltar Detached Mole ("C" Head) Lighthouse | 4232; D 2446 | Q.G. | | 36°08.6′N 5°22.0′W | "C" Head of Detached Mole, Gibraltar Harbour |
| Gibraltar North Mole Lighthouse | 4236; D 2448 | Q.R. | | 36°08.7′N 5°21.9′W | "D" Head of North Mole, Gibraltar Harbour |
| Gibraltar North Mole Elbow Lighthouse | 4240; D 2449.2 | F.R. | Image | 36°09.0′N 5°21.9′W | "E" Head of North Mole, Gibraltar Harbour |
| New Camp Jetty | 4242; D 2451.5 | 2 F.G. | | 36°08.4′N 5°21.5′W | New Camp Jetty, Gibraltar Harbour |
| Cormorant Camber | D 2450.7 | | Image | | Cormorant Camber, Gibraltar Harbour |
| Coaling Island | 4244; D 2450.7 | 2 F.R. | | 36°08.2′N 5°21.4′W | Coaling Island, Gibraltar Harbour |
| Coaling Island | D 2451.5 | | Image | | New Mole Head, Coaling Island, Gibraltar Harbour |
| Ordnance Wharf | 4248; D 2451.2 | 2 F.G. | | 36°08.1′N 5°21.4′W | Ordnance Wharf, Gibraltar Harbour |
| Gibraltar Aerobeacon | 4256; D 2456 | Mo.(GB)R.10s | Image | 36.143884°N 5.343053°W | Rock of Gibraltar |

== See also ==
- Lists of lighthouses and lightvessels
