= Gibraltar Detached Mole ("C" Head) Lighthouse =

- Location: Gibraltar Harbour, Gibraltar, Iberian Peninsula
- Coordinates: 36.1426°N 5.3673°W

Tower
- Construction: Concrete
- Height: 37 Feet
- Shape: Square

Light
- Focal height: 33 Feet (10 Metres)
- Range: 5 Nautical Miles
- Characteristic: Q.G.

The Gibraltar Detached Mole ("C" Head) Lighthouse is one of several lighthouses in Gibraltar, a British Overseas Territory at the south end of the Iberian Peninsula. The lighthouse is positioned west of the Rock of Gibraltar, on the Detached Mole at the north entrance to Gibraltar Harbour.

== History ==
Gibraltar Harbour, also referred to as the Port of Gibraltar, is on the west side of Gibraltar, at latitude 36º09'N, and longitude 5º20'W. In addition to the protection provided to the harbour by the Rock of Gibraltar, there is a system of manmade defences. These include a trio of breakwaters: the North Mole (formerly the Commercial Mole) including its Western Arm, the Detached Mole, and the South Mole. The South Mole includes an extension which was added later, and was previously known as the New Mole and New Mole Extension. The harbour has both north and south entrances. The northern entry is bordered by the Western Arm of the North Mole and the Detached Mole. The southern entry is between the Detached Mole and the South Mole.

The Gibraltar Detached Mole ("C" Head) Lighthouse is located at the north end of the Detached Mole of Gibraltar Harbour. It is positioned at the "C" Head of the Detached Mole. The lighthouse and harbour are to the north of the east end of the Strait of Gibraltar, the entrance to the Mediterranean Sea, and west of the Rock.

The Detached Mole ("C" Head) Lighthouse, like the "B" Head Lighthouse, comprises a square tower built of concrete, on piles, with a height of 37 feet. The light characteristic is a quick, flashing green light, and the range is 5 nautical miles. The focal plane of the light is 33 feet (10 metres).

The United Kingdom Hydrographic Office Admiralty number for the lighthouse, originating in Volume D of the Admiralty List of Lights and Fog Signals, is D 2446. The United States National Geospatial-Intelligence Agency (NGA) number, from Publication 113 - List of Lights, Radio Aids, and Fog Signals, is 4232. Its Amateur Radio Lighthouse Society number, from the ARLHS World List of Lights (WLOL), is GIB-004.
