= Gibraltar South Mole Lighthouse =

Gibraltar South Mole Lighthouse A Head
- Location: Gibraltar Harbour, Gibraltar, Iberian Peninsula
- Coordinates: 36.13396°N 5.36422°W

Tower
- Construction: cast iron tower
- Height: 17 metres (56 ft)
- Shape: cylindrical mast with beacon
- Markings: white tower
- Operator: Port of Gibraltar

Light
- Focal height: 18 metres (59 ft)
- Range: white: 15 nautical miles (28 km; 17 mi)
- Characteristic: Fl W 2s.

The Gibraltar South Mole Lighthouse is one of several lighthouses in Gibraltar, a British Overseas Territory at the south end of the Iberian Peninsula. Also known as the Gibraltar "A" Head Lighthouse, it has a cast-iron, skeletal tower which is painted black and features two galleries. The lighthouse remains operational and is positioned west of the Rock of Gibraltar, on the South Mole at Gibraltar Harbour. It is operated by the Gibraltar Port Authority.

== History ==
Gibraltar Harbour (pictured on map), also referred to as the Port of Gibraltar, is on the west side of the British Overseas Territory of Gibraltar, at latitude 36º09'N, and longitude 5º20'W. In addition to the protection provided to the port by the Rock of Gibraltar on the east, there is a system of manmade defences on the west. These include a trio of breakwaters: the North Mole (formerly the Commercial Mole) including its Western Arm, the Detached Mole, and the South Mole. The South Mole includes an extension which was added later, and was formerly known as the New Mole and New Mole Extension. The harbour has both north and south entrances. The northern entry is bordered by the Western Arm of the North Mole and the (middle) Detached Mole. The southern entry is between the Detached Mole and the South Mole.

The Gibraltar South Mole Lighthouse (shown on map) is located at the north end of the South Mole of Gibraltar Harbour. It is positioned at the "A" head of the South Mole (formerly specified as the extension), from which it derives its alternate name. The lighthouse and port are to the north of the east end of the Strait of Gibraltar, the entryway to the Mediterranean Sea, and west of the Rock of Gibraltar.

The South Mole Lighthouse comprises a black, octagonal tower built of cast iron, with a height of 17 metres (56 ft). This description correlates with the photograph from The Online List of Lights. The skeletal tower has a central cylinder and has retained its original gallery. The lamp was exchanged for a square skeletal tower and new lantern, with a second gallery platform, to elevate the plane of the light. (A similar tower at the south end of the Western Arm of the North Mole of the port differs in that it lacks the original gallery platform.) Publication 113 gives a different physical description of the lighthouse as a round, white tower, 56 feet in height. The Gibraltar "A" Head Lighthouse continues to be active and is utilised as an aid to navigation, in and near the harbour. Its light characteristic is a flashing white light, with one flash every two seconds, and the range is fifteen nautical miles. The operational lighthouse has a focal plane of 18 metres (60 feet).

The lighthouse tower and the site are both closed to the public. The South Mole Lighthouse is operated by the Gibraltar Port Authority. The United Kingdom Hydrographic Office Admiralty number for the lighthouse, which originates from Volume D of the Admiralty List of Lights and Fog Signals, is D 2442. The United States National Geospatial-Intelligence Agency (NGA) number is 4224. Its Amateur Radio Lighthouse Society (ARLHS) number is GIB-002, and the lighthouse has been listed in the World List of Lights since 2006.

== See also ==
- List of lighthouses in Gibraltar
