= Gibraltar North Mole Lighthouse =

Gibraltar North Mole Lighthouse D Head
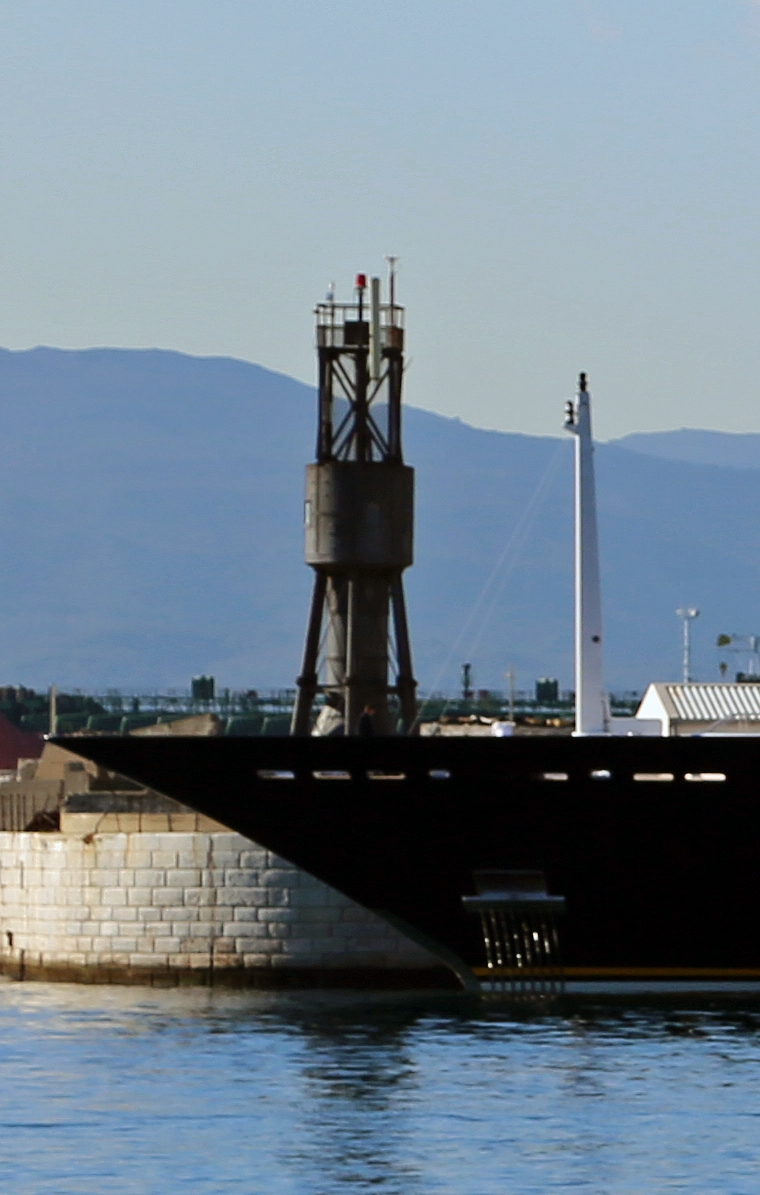
- Location: Gibraltar Harbour, Gibraltar
- Coordinates: 36.144154°N 5.365775°W

Tower
- Construction: cast iron skeletal tower
- Height: 17 metres (56 ft)
- Shape: octagonal tower with balcony
- Markings: black tower
- Operator: Port of Gibraltar

Light
- Focal height: 18 metres (59 ft)
- Range: red: 5 nautical miles (9.3 km; 5.8 mi)
- Characteristic: Q R

The Gibraltar North Mole Lighthouse is one of several lighthouses in Gibraltar, the British Overseas Territory at the southern end of the Iberian Peninsula. Also referred to as the Gibraltar "D" Head Lighthouse, its cast-iron tower is painted black. The active lighthouse west of the Rock of Gibraltar is positioned on the Western Arm of the North Mole at Gibraltar Harbour, and is operated by the Gibraltar Port Authority.

== History ==
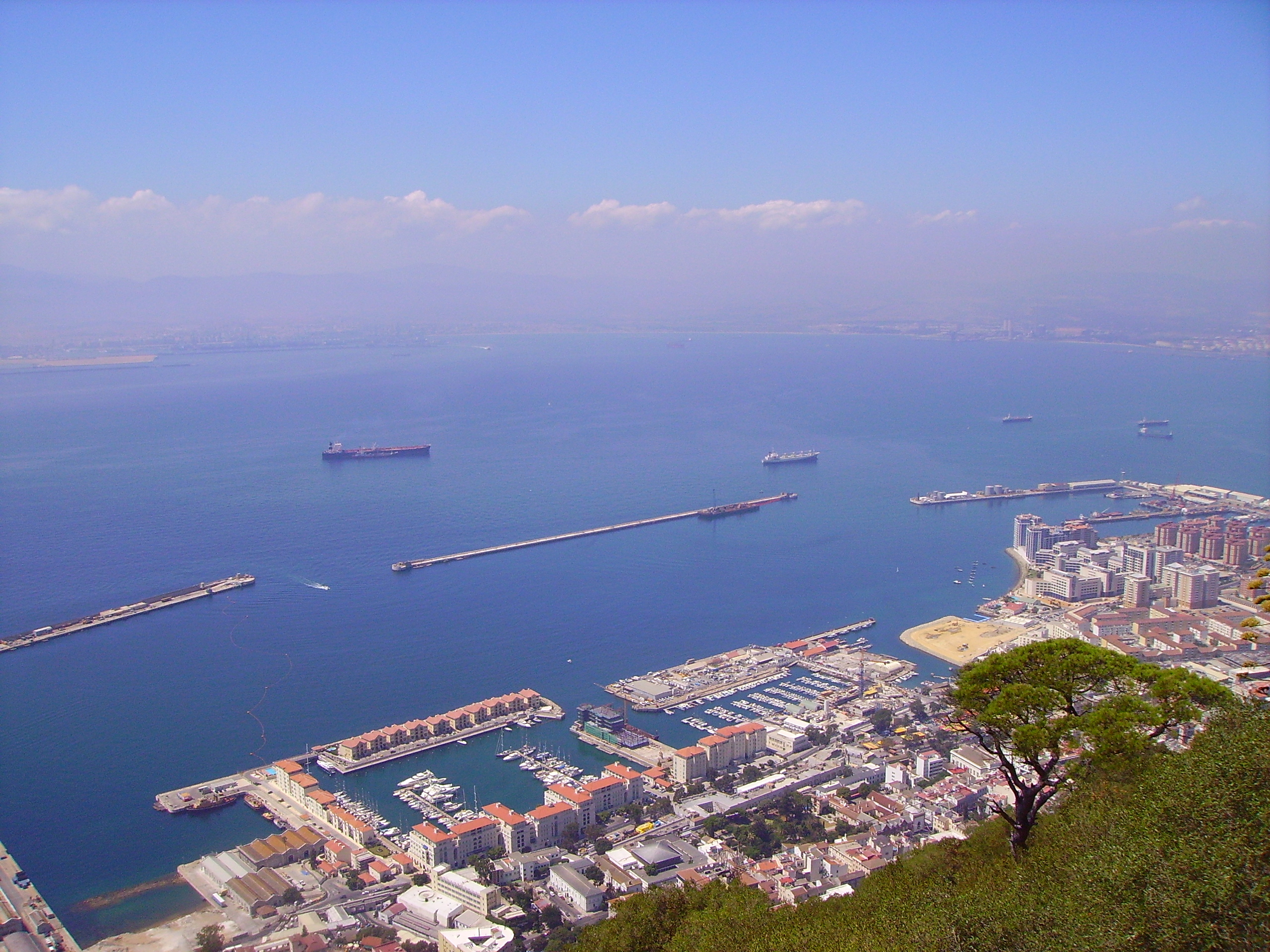
Gibraltar Harbour with South Mole (left), Detached Mole (center), and North Mole (right)

Gibraltar Harbour (pictured), also known as the Port of Gibraltar, is on the west side of the British Overseas Territory of Gibraltar, at latitude 36º09'N, and longitude 05º20'W. In addition to the natural protection provided by the Rock, there is a set of man-made defences. These include three breakwaters: the North Mole with its Western Arm, the Detached Mole, and the South Mole. The port has north and south entrances. The northern entrance is between the Western Arm of the North Mole and the Detached Mole. The southern entrance is between the Detached Mole and the South Mole.

The Gibraltar North Mole Lighthouse (depicted on map) is located at the south end of the Western Arm of the L-shaped North Mole of the Port of Gibraltar. It is positioned at the "D" head of the North Mole; hence, its alternate name. The lighthouse and harbour are north of the eastern end of the Strait of Gibraltar and its access to the Mediterranean, and west of the Rock.

The Gibraltar North Mole Lighthouse is a black, octagonal tower constructed of cast iron, with a height of 17 metres (56 feet). The skeletal tower has a central cylinder. The original lantern and gallery platform were exchanged for a square skeletal tower and new lantern and gallery platform to elevate the light source. (A similar tower at the north end of the South Mole of the harbour differs in that it retains its original gallery.) The Gibraltar North Mole Lighthouse is operational and is utilized as an aid to navigation, particularly in and near the port. The light characteristic is a quick, flashing red light, and the range is five nautical miles. The active lighthouse has a focal plane of 18 metres (59 feet).

Both the tower and the site are closed to the public. The lighthouse is operated by the Gibraltar Port Authority. The United Kingdom Hydrographic Office Admiralty Digital List of Lights (ADLL) number for the Gibraltar North Mole Lighthouse is D2448. Its United States National Geospatial-Intelligence Agency (NGA) number is 4236. The Amateur Radio Lighthouse Society (ARLHS) number is GIB-005.

== See also ==
- List of lighthouses in Gibraltar
