= Gibraltar North Mole Elbow Lighthouse =

- Location: Gibraltar Harbour, Gibraltar``
- Coordinates: 36.148409°N 5.365903°W

Tower
- Construction: steel skeletal tower
- Height: 25 metres (82 ft)
- Shape: square tower with control room
- Markings: grey metallic
- Operator: Port of Gibraltar

Light
- Deactivated: 2013
- Range: red: 5 nautical miles (9.3 km; 5.8 mi)
- Characteristic: F R

The Gibraltar North Mole Elbow Lighthouse is one of several lighthouses in Gibraltar, a British Overseas Territory at the south end of the peninsula of Iberia. Also known as the Gibraltar "E" Head Lighthouse, its tower is painted grey. The active lighthouse is west of the Rock of Gibraltar and positioned at the elbow of the North Mole at Gibraltar Harbour. The lighthouse is operated by the Gibraltar Port Authority.

== History ==
Gibraltar Harbour (shown on map), also referred to as the Port of Gibraltar, is on the west side of Gibraltar, at latitude 36°09'N and longitude 05°20'W. In addition to the protection provided by the Rock, the harbour now has a system of man-made defences. These include three breakwaters: the North Mole (formerly the Commercial Mole) with its Western Arm, the Detached Mole (in the middle), and the South Mole. The mole was defended by the North Mole Elbow Battery, which operated until as late as the end of the Second World War, with another gun mounted at the end of the mole.

In May 2011, the North Mole was the site of an explosion of an oil storage tank. The South Mole has an extension, and was formerly known as the New Mole and New Mole Extension (to distinguish it from the Old Mole at the northeastern corner of the harbour). Gibraltar Harbour has north and south entrances. The northern entry is between the Western Arm of the North Mole and the Detached Mole. The southern is bordered by the Detached Mole and the South Mole.

== Description ==
The Gibraltar North Mole Elbow Lighthouse (shown on map and pictured in links below) is located at the elbow of the L-shaped North Mole of Gibraltar Harbour. It is positioned at the "E" head of the North Mole, from which the lighthouse derives its alternate name. The lighthouse and harbour are west of the Rock of Gibraltar, and north of the east end of the Strait of Gibraltar, which serves as access to the Mediterranean.

The Gibraltar North Mole Elbow Lighthouse is a grey, square, skeletal tower, with a height of 25 metres (82 feet). The skeletal tower has a round harbour control room, watch room, and gallery platform. The light is emitted from a skeletal extension of the main tower which has been installed adjacent to the control room. The lighthouse is operational and is utilised as an aid to navigation, in and near the port. The light characteristic is a fixed red light, with a range of five nautical miles. The active lighthouse has a focal plane of 28 metres (92 feet).

The lighthouse tower is closed to the public. Opinions differ as to whether the site is open to the public. The lighthouse is operated by the Gibraltar Port Authority. The United Kingdom Hydrographic Office Admiralty List of Lights and Fog Signals number for the Gibraltar North Mole Elbow Lighthouse is D 2449.2. The United States National Geospatial-Intelligence Agency (NGA), formerly the National Imagery and Mapping Agency, number is 4240.

== See also ==
- List of lighthouses in Gibraltar
