= List of shipwrecks of Gibraltar =

Larger shipwrecks shown

A list of shipwrecks of Gibraltar. The vast majority of the shipwrecks are located near the west coast in or just outside the Gibraltar harbour area within the Bay of Gibraltar. In addition to the ships there are other items of interest on the seabed in the vicinity. Off the end of Europa Point there is said to be a large number of Roman and Phoenician anchors. Other items appear to have been dumped. In one case there are two Sherman tanks on the eastern side and two piles of rusting cannons on the west.

== Larger ships and aircraft ==
- SS Excellent, a 1600-ton steamsail ship which sank after colliding on 29 February 1888. Roughly 260 ft in length, the wreck, at a depth of 30 m, is upside down with the engine and a boiler still visible.(36.137519°N 5.365221°W)
- SS Mount Olive. a steamer which sank in two parts during a rescue attempt in 1890, in the inner wreck is at a depth of 20-22m and the outer wreck is at 40-49m.(36.14247°N 5.368059°W)
- A Bristol bomber which crashed during World War II at a depth of 35m.(36.130437°N 5.365658°W)
- SMS Cormorant, a gunboat which sank during World War II, located at a depth of 32m.(36.143135°N 5.36895°W)
- Four engines of an Avro Shackleton maritime patrol aircraft which crashed in the 1960s at a depth of 10m. They were located by divers in 1998.(36.126708°N 5.337471°W)
- Two Sherman tanks dumped in the 1960s at a depth of 3m.(36.1101°N 5.3437°W)
- SS Rosslyn, a 3,600 ton cargo vessel at a depth of 21-3m which sank during a strong storm in 1916 just outside the South Mole is the largest wreck in the area. (36.130408°N 5.362416°W)
- A cable laying barge artificially sunk in 1990 at a depth of 33m was later joined by many ships and other items to create a reef.(36.114316°N 5.352249°W)

== Smaller vessels ==
- Le Peipo, a wooden cruising vessel at a depth 27-30m.(36.121014°N 5.358304°W)
- Ark of Jesus Christ, a wooden fishing boat at a depth of 19m.(36.119002°N 5.353625°W)
- Helen, a fishing vessel at a depth of 21m.(36.133295°N 5.364662°W)
- A Pilot boat, at a depth of 22m.(36.132886°N 5.366772°W)
- Mui, at a depth 35m.(36.135619°N 5.367516°W)
