= 30 Battery (Rogers's Company) Royal Artillery =

British Army artillery battery

- Active: 1759 – present
- Country: United Kingdom
- Branch: British Army
- Type: Artillery
- Role: Air Defence
- Size: Artillery battery
- Part of: 16th Regiment Royal Artillery
- Garrison/HQ: Thorney Island
- Anniversaries: Waterloo Day 18 June
- Equipment: Rapier Field Standard C
- Engagements: Seven Years' War; American Revolutionary War; French Revolutionary Wars; Napoleonic Wars; Crimean War; Indian Mutiny; World War I; World War II; Suez Crisis; Indonesia–Malaysia confrontation; Northern Ireland

30 Battery (Rogers's Company) Royal Artillery is a unit of the British Army founded in 1759, and currently part of 16th Regiment Royal Artillery

== Origins and early years ==
The company was raised on 1 January 1759 as Captain F.J. Buchanan's company, 2nd Battalion (there were only three at that time), Royal Artillery. The Battery was used to provide numerous attached personnel to other units, much as it does today, and, as such the Battery's history can be traced from many far-flung destinations across the globe. At its time of inception the country was embroiled in the Seven Years' War, which ran from 1756 to 1763. Wrangling with the French was by no means a new thing, but it was during this seven-year period that the Battery or elements of it saw action in two arenas, namely Menorca and then Gibraltar.

In 1756 both the military and the Government were deceived by the French into believing that an attack on England was imminent. The French amassed some 50,000 troops near the Channel ports and this was enough to force the English into deploying artillery in a coastal defence role. As it transpired this amassing of troops was more than likely a decoy for the force that was subsequently sent to the Mediterranean, which by comparison was virtually unguarded. The French objective was the smaller of the two significant Balearic Islands, Menorca. The in site garrison force at Fort St Phillip comprised 24 × 32-pounders, 50 × 18-pounders, 40 × 12-pounders, 36 × 8-pounders, and 10 × 6-pounders.

This was not an inconsiderable force to defend an island, but was overpowered in a matter of months and eventually surrendered. By the terms of the capitulation, the British Garrison was repatriated to Britain by way of Gibraltar, an indulgence granted by the French as a token of their respect for the brave defence. It also interesting to note that the soldiers were also rewarded by the Board of Ordnance, who granted them an extra half a days wage per day of the siege.

The company subsequently became involved with an attempt to regain control of Menorca over the following two years.

Between 1785 and 1791 the Battery was stationed at Gibraltar. Elements of the Battery are believed to have been stationed at Gibraltar before then and were therefore involved in the Great Siege by the Spanish and the French, which lasted nearly four years from 1779 to 1783. At this time there were only 25 officers and 460 NCOs and men to man 452 guns and mortars. In addition they were only getting limited supplies of food smuggled in from North Africa.

The Battery was rarely recorded in action as one cohesive unit, but with sections being seconded as operational commitments dictated and this trend was to continue. For example, in 1778, records show that five soldiers from 30 Battery served for the first seven months of the year aboard the bomb vessel Thunder based in New York.

== The Napoleonic Wars ==
In 1794, under General Sir Charles Grey, the Battery helped to capture Martinique and Guadeloupe, and detachments were also engaged in suppressing French inspired Negro riots in St Lucia, Grenada and St Vincent. By now the Battery had been engaged in almost back-to-back campaigns far removed from home and this had taken its toll. At the turn of the century the disease-decimated Battery returned home to the Royal Artillery Barracks at Woolwich to recuperate.

The next significant point in the history of the Battery is in 1806 when Captain Thomas Rogers took command. He led the Battery for an uninterrupted 19 years and it is in honour of his command at Waterloo that the Battery still carries his name. At the outset his powers of leadership were tested as the Battery sailed on 28 July 1809 for what was to be an ill-fated expedition to Walcheren. The force comprising 144 guns and mortars and 35 ships of the line was intended to relieve French pressure on the Austrian Alliance. Unfortunately, the expedition was struck by widespread sickness and was forced to turn sail for England.

=== Waterloo ===
The Battle of Waterloo is a turning point in history as it marks the end of 23 years of fighting with the French, first in the Revolutionary Wars and then in the wars against Napoleon. It is significant to the Battery because it is here that their honour title was won.

In 1815 the Battery mustered at Colchester and departed from Harwich aboard HMS Sargossa for the Low Countries and yet more clashes with the now familiar enemy, the French. Rogers's Company was equipped with six 9-pounder guns, then deployed to Belgium as part of 5th Division under the command of Sir Thomas Picton. On 16 June 1815 Rogers's Company was one of the two British artillery units engaged in the Battle of Quatre Bras. As soon as the British arrived on the field to support the Dutch-Belgian troops, Rogers's Company came into position on the left of Kempt's infantry brigade and was engaged in a furious artillery duel with numerous French guns well hidden in a wood some six hundred yards in front of their position.

Though suffering heavy losses in men and horses and threatened by a large body of cuirassiers, the Battery maintained its steady fire and later, by opportune salvos of case-shot, or grape, completely repulsed a column of enemy infantry that was attempting to attack the British left flank. The arrival of British reinforcements decided the battle and next day Rogers's Company withdrew to Waterloo.

At the opening of the battle on 18 June 1815, the Battery was in a position in front of the infantry of the 5th Division on the left of the Brussels Road and under direct orders from Wellington, were only to open fire on an enemy advance.

Napoleon ordered the advance and the Battery directed its fire onto the advancing mass of French infantry. In spite of the tremendous losses, the enemy came on with great determination and Sir Thomas Picton stationed himself at the front next to the Battery to direct fire. Calmly the gunners waited with lighted portfires until the head of the French column appeared over the crest in front of the guns. At the word "fire" a tremendous salvo of grape shattered the enemy and before they could recover the British infantry charged them. A melee ensued which the gunners joined in, armed only with rammers, until the French resolve weakened and they gave way in confusion. So critical was the situation at this time that one of Rogers's guns was spiked by its Number 1 to prevent it being used by the enemy who seemed bound to capture it.

During the battle Sir Thomas Picton was killed close by the Battery. As soon as the French had been repulsed Rogers's Company moved to the right of the Brussels road to assist that portion of the hard pressed line and later changed position again farther to the right to assist Bolton's guns. Here the three remaining pieces – two being out of action through losses among the teams, assisted in the decisive stroke of the battle, the repulse of the Imperial Guard. As those veterans advanced steadily in a column over the crest of the hill they were met by a tempest of fire from Bolton's guns on the left and Rogers's guns on the right. Whole ranks were blown away by his murderous discharge and before they could deploy, the British infantry completed the rout by a charge, which drove them back in utter confusion. Immediately the British line advanced and the Battery struggled forward to support the movement across the sodden fields to La Belle Alliance where the pursuit was taken over by the Prussians under Generalfeldmarschall Blücher.

Following their efforts at the Battle of Waterloo the Battery returned home for a six-year tour on British soil, followed by garrison duty in the West Indies and Gibraltar.

== Crimean War ==
When the company returned from abroad they were based in Ireland to help quell the Irish riots of 1849–53, in a dismounted infantry role. The following year saw the start of the Crimean War when an expedition of 24,000 English, 22,000 French and 8,000 Turkish troops landed north of Sevastopol in September 1854. The Battery, then 2nd Company of the 3rd Battalion RA and commanded by Captain A.C. Gleig left several months later once the siege of Sevastopol was underway.

The Battery left Woolwich and set sail from Greenhithe for Balaclava in May 1855. It was 203 officers and soldiers strong and there was nearly a horse per man – well this was true at the time of sailing but unfortunately five died en route. In fact the records from this period of the Battery's history holds more information about the welfare of the horses than of the fighting soldiers. Indeed, it is fair to say of the siege that the Battery lost more men to the ravages off cholera and other diseases than in action; there is no record of a soldier being lost in action at Sevastopol, yet there is accurate documentation of the number that were detained in hospital.

Month	Sick in Hospital	Sent to Scutari	Died
June 1855	27	0	17
July 1855	37	5	3
August 1855	21	16	5
September 1855	19	13	4
October 1855	9	7	1
November 1855	17	4	1
December 1855	9	4	2

At Sevastopol the Battery distinguished itself, but like the rest of the expedition, it suffered gravely from disease and cold. British losses totalled 24,000 by the end of the campaign. The company was one of eight field batteries mobilised for the campaign and along with a siege train and troops from the Royal Horse Artillery, the original artillery contingent was complete under the command of Brigadier General Thomas Fox-Strangways. The Battery consisted of one captain, one second captain, three first lieutenants, one colour sergeant, five sergeants, five corporals, five bombardiers, 174 gunners/drivers (for the first time recorded as drivers) and two trumpeters. The artificers included a farrier, five shoeing-smiths, two collar makers and two wheelers.

The Battery that returned from the hardship of the Crimea in June 1856 was dishevelled and once again was fortunate to get a spell in England to carry out much needed regrouping and recuperation. The Battery was next called overseas in response to the Indian Mutiny where it was felt that the strength of the garrisons there should be bolstered. The rebellion was actually confined to a relatively small part of the sub-continent, namely the area of Delhi and the province of Uttar Pradesh, and part of the more central region of India. The capture of Delhi was the first priority and with great daring the officers in the Punjab rushed what troops they could to the city. Once in the area they seized a ridge of high land commanding the city and kept it under continual attack while reinforcements and a siege train was assembled and sent to join them. After four years of garrison and internal security duty in Bengal the Battery returned to England was again engaged in policing the Irish in the Riots of 1868–69. The Battery returned to India in 1871 where it was successively stationed in Bengal, Darjeeling, Calcutta and Rawalpindi, sailing home via Aden to England in 1884. Before the Battery had had a chance to lament the balmy Indian evenings that the English weather could not match it was again off to India, this time bound for Burma and operations against the Burmese rebels in a jungle warfare role. Once the situation in Burma was resolved the Battery returned once more to garrison duty, in Madras, Karachi and Fort Attock until 1904.

== The First World War ==
The Battery served in Gibraltar from 1905 to 1926 and therefore took part in what many called the Forgotten War, while the world's attention was focused on the Western Front. In 1902 the Battery was known as 54 Company Royal Garrison Artillery, but by 1924 had amalgamated with 55 Company and renamed 8 Heavy Battery Royal Artillery. During the First World War the Battery frequently engaged German submarines and the Governor, Lieutenant General Sir Herbert Miles presented a pair of binoculars to the Rock Fishing Club. On the night of 31 December 1915 enemy submarines attacked the fortress; the South Mole Battery and Elbow Battery, manned by Rogers's Company, opened fire on the enemy and managed to drive them off. The Army Council wrote to congratulate the Battery on its actions:

"Relative to an engagement of hostile submarines on the night of 31 December 1915, I am commanded by the Army Council to say that they concur in the view expressed by you, that this occurrence reflects great credit on the vigilance and training of the Royal Garrison Artillery"

After 21 years based at Gibraltar the Battery returned England. Initially on return to England the Battery was involved in trials and firing at Fort Yaverland. Throughout the inter-war years the Battery fluctuated between coast defence in Ireland and coastal defence on mainland England. In 1938 the evacuation of the Queenstown Harbour defences took place and a ceremonial parade was held to hand over to the Irish Army. Because 19th Heavy Battery was being made up to war strength many NCOs and men were taken from the Battery and 1 and 8 Heavy Batteries were reduced to cadre strength and amalgamated to form 8 Heavy Battery RA.

== The Second World War ==
In September 1939 the Battery became 2nd Coast Defence Training Battery RA as part of 2nd Heavy Regiment in the Royal Citadel, Plymouth. This Regiment was formed on the evacuation of the North and South Irish coast defences in July 1938. 1 and 8 Heavy Batteries were re-formed and became 1st and 2nd Coast Training Batteries. They received recruits from the RA Depot and trained them as Coast Defence gunners.

== The Post War years ==
In August 1946 the battery was stationed at Llandudno under the title 8th (Rogers's Company) Coast Battery RA. They were involved in training on the 5.25 inches (133 mm) dual purpose gun in preparation for the Coast Artillery Gunnery course, firing at both sea and air targets. In 1947 the Battery was renumbered 30 (Rogers's Company) Coast Battery and 2 Coast Training Regiment was renamed 16 Light Anti-Aircraft Regiment RA. The camp was subsequently renamed Waterloo Camp after the Battery's most significant action. The Regiment, and 30 Battery with it, moved to Bulford Camp in 1950, on to Osnabrück in 1952 equipped with 40 mm Bofors guns, then back to Bulford four years later.

=== Cyprus 1956–57 ===
In 1956 the Battery took part in the Suez operation. After pausing to train in Malta, it deployed to Tymbou Airfield, Cyprus, to provide air defence cover to the airfield from which the French parachute operation against Port Said was mounted. The Battery dug in around the airfield and undertook the energy-sapping task of being continuously at two hours readiness. In December 1956 the battery exchanged its air defence task for an internal security role that saw them move all over the Island including Dhekelia, Larnaka and Episkopi, carrying out vehicle checkpoints, OPs and other garrison duties.

=== Confrontation with Indonesia, 1962–66 ===
Between Cyprus and the next operational deployment to Malaysia, the Battery bounced between Bulford, Shorncliffe and Krefeld in Germany. After a brief 10-day Battery skiing trip to Winterberg, they deployed to Malaysia to provide low-level air defence of Kuching Airfield in the confrontation with Indonesia. This was an exciting time for the Battery as they also conducted mobile fighting patrols, all this thousands of miles from home and in a jungle environment. In addition, the Battery provided two FOOs and two mortar detachments in support of the infantry. The Battery was then quartered at Nee Soon in Singapore from where they conducted a firing camp at China Rock, where A Sub gained the nickname Shiney Alpha after exceptionally good shooting. R&R was also on the agenda and families were ferried out to a remote island for a big barbecue. The Battery was then posted back to Borneo in its operational role, but this was very short lived as the campaign came to a swift end and it found itself posted once again to a sparsely populated area, this time Barton Stacey in Hampshire.

=== Northern Ireland ===
There was nothing glamorous about Rogers's deployment to Hollywood Barracks, Belfast, in 1970 once again on internal security duties, this time in Ireland. Adaptable as ever, the Battery requisitioned a tin hut and a club-house for accommodation. Initially the Battery had deployed to cover the marching season, but this was soon extended to a full four-month tour. The early part of the tour was active for all the Battery in terms of riot control, but the latter half of the tour was more sedate with the soldiers helping families recover from the terrible flooding that hit south Belfast. In September the Battery was redeployed to take responsibility for Andersonstown as part of the Whiterock AOR (area of operational responsibility). Two years later the Battery was posted back to Ireland, again in a dismounted role, but this time to Derry to protect the docks and commercial centre of the city. The first major incident that they had to deal with was a car bomb: the car was parked up at Boating Club Lane but the bombers gave a different location in their warning which the Battery duly cleared. The incident passed fortunately without injury to anybody but it anybody but it set the tone for the disturbances that took place over Christmas that year culminating in the Strand bombing.

The Battery went back to Derry again in 1976, this time to the Bogside AOR. This was to prove to be quite an eventful tour of duty. First blood came on 29 June when 179 pounds (81 kg) of explosives were found during an afternoon search. An unidentified Republican separatist laid explosives, but was himself killed in an accidental detonation. This was then followed by the Rossville incident on 6 July when a routine patrol made contact. Gunner Ferguson was hit in the thigh and therefore the remainder of the patrol returned fire. The other part of the multiple patrol ran into the block of flats where the shots had come from, where they identified the firing point and found an ArmaLite rifle and full magazine. In the follow-up operation two men were arrested and handed over to the Royal Ulster Constabulary. Sgt. Lovelace was Mentioned in Dispatches for his role in the incident. During the remainder of the tour the Battery uncovered more explosives and weapons.

Between 1977 and 1979, the Battery took part in other activities, among them manning the Green Goddess fire engines in Sheffield during the fireman's strike and training in the infantry role in Cyprus and carrying out public duties at the Tower of London, including the Ceremony of the Keys. The Battery also said farewell to the L40/70 Bofors at a Farewell to the Bofors Parade, as well as taking over the new Rapier Field Standard A (FSA) air defence missile system in the Hebrides on its first live firing camp. The Battery, still with the 16 Air Defence Regiment, has moved between Rapier Barracks, Kirton in Lindsey, Lincolnshire, and Napier Barracks, Dortmund.

Following another tour in Ireland in 1980 which had begun with a find of a weapons cache in the gardens of a convent, the Battery resumed its air defence role in January 1981 and took part in a ground-breaking exercise called "Mallet Blow": the Battery was incorporated into an RAF bombing exercise to improve the realism for the pilots and navigators. This allowed the new Rapier weapon system to be tested in its tracking capability in a realistic environment. Operators and pilots alike duly praised the system. Not long after this, in March 1983, members of the Battery deployed to San Carlos Water in the Falklands. A number of problems with the Rapier system became apparent in the operational environment.

The FSA towed Rapier system was eventually replaced with the tracked Rapier system in 1993 and 30 Battery converted to the new system, the Mark 1B Final, which had optical and thermal imagery capability. In 1995, as part of the redeployment of the Army following the end of the Cold War, the Battery moved to Woolwich, where it received the highly capable Rapier FSC, 30 Battery being the first to convert. The battery travelled up to the Hebrides to fire the equipment live on an annual basis, regularly winning the best recce group and best command post awards. In 2000 the Battery shipped its equipment to Falklands to live fire in a very realistic war environment.

In 2002 the Battery prepared for another trip to Cyprus, as part of the UN Force guarding the Green Line between the hostile Greek and Turkish communities.

== See also ==
- List of Royal Artillery batteries
