= List of British Army regiments (1800) =

The Organization is as follows:

- Regiment
- New Formed Regiment - from 1777 - to 1800

== Household Cavalry ==
- 1st Regiment of Life Guards - Heavy Cavalry, part of the Household Cavalry
- 2nd Regiment of Life Guards - Heavy Cavalry, part of the Household Cavalry
- Royal Horse Guards (Blues) - Heavy Cavalry, part of the Household Cavalry

== Cavalry ==
=== Dragoon Guards ===
- 1st (The Kings) Dragoon Guards
- 2nd (The Queen's) Regiment of Dragoon Guards
- 3rd (The Prince of Wales') Dragoon Guards
- 4th (Royal Irish) Dragoon Guards
- 5th Regiment of Dragoon Guards
- 6th Regiment of Dragoon Guards
- 7th (The Princess Royal's) Dragoon Guards

=== Dragoons ===
- 1st (Royal) Dragoons
- 2nd (Royal North British) Dragoons
- 3rd (King's Own) Dragoons
- 5th (Royal Irish) Dragoons
- 4th (Queen's Own) Dragoons
- 6th (Inniskilling) Dragoons

=== Light Dragoons ===
- 7th (Queen's Own) Light Dragoons
- 8th (The King's Royal Irish) Light Dragoons
- 9th Light Dragoons
- 10th (Prince of Wales') Light Dragoons
- 11th Light Dragoons
- 12th (Prince of Wales') Light Dragoons
- 13th Light Dragoons
- 14th (Duchess of York's) Light Dragoons
- 15th (King's) Light Dragoons
- 16th (The Queen's) Light Dragoons
- 17th Light Dragoons
- 18th Light Dragoons
- 19th Light Dragoons

== Foot Guards ==
- 1st Regiment of Foot Guards - 4 Battalion from 1803-1804, than reduced to 3
- Coldstream Regiment of Foot Guards - 2 Battalions
- 3rd Regiment of Foot Guards - 2 Battalions

== Infantry of the Line ==
Regiments of Foot, (Infantry of the Line) are line infantry regiments part of the army.

- 1st (Royal) Regiment of Foot - 4 Battalions from 1804-1816, then 3 until 1817 then 2
- 2nd (Queen's Royal) Regiment of Foot - 1 Battalion
- 3rd (East Kent) Regiment of Foot - 2 Battalions from 1803-1815
- 4th (The King's Own) Regiment of Foot - 2 Battalions from 1804-1815
- 5th (Northumberland) Regiment of Foot - 2 Battalions from 1804-1816
- 6th (1st Warwickshire) Regiment of Foot - 2 Battalions from 1804-1815
- 7th (Royal Fusiliers) Regiment of Foot - 2 Battalions from 1804-1815
- 8th (King's) Regiment of Foot - 2 Battalions from 1804-1815
- 9th (East Norfolk) Regiment of Foot - 2 Battalions from 1804-1815
- 10th (North Lincolnshire) Regiment of Foot - 2 Battalions from 1804-1816
- 11th (North Devonshire) Regiment of Foot - 2 Battalions from 1808-1816
- 12th (East Suffolk) Regiment of Foot - 2 Battalions from 1811-1818
- 13th (1st Somersetshire) Regiment of Foot - 1 Battalion
- 14th (Bedfordshire) Regiment of Foot - Became Buckinghamshire in 1809 - 2 Battalions 1804-1816 and 3 from 1813-1816
- 15th (Yorkshire East Riding) Regiment of Foot - 2 Battalions from 1799-1802 and again 1804-1816
- 16th (Buckinghamshire) Regiment of Foot - Re-named "Bedfordshire" in 1809 - 1 Battalion
- 17th (Leicestershire) Regiment of Foot - 2 Battalions 1799-1802
- 18th (Royal Irish) Regiment of Foot - 2 Battalions 1803-1814
- 19th (1st Yorkshire North Riding) Regiment of Foot - 1 Battalion
- 20th (East Devonshire) Regiment of Foot - 2 Battalions 1799-1802
- 21st (Royal North British Fusiliers) Regiment of Foot - 2 Battalions 1804-1816
- 22nd (Cheshire) Regiment of Foot - 2 Battalions in 1814
- 23rd (Royal Welch Fusiliers) Regiment of Foot - 2 Battalions 1804-1814
- 24th (2nd Warwickshire) Regiment of Foot - 2 Battalions 1804-1814
- 25th (Sussex) Regiment of Foot - Renamed "King's Own Borderers" in 1805 - 2 Battalions 1804-1816
- 26th (Cameronian) Regiment of Foot - 2 Battalions 1804-1813
- 27th (Inniskilling) Regiment of Foot - 2 Battalions 1800-1803, than again 1805-1817, 3 Battalions from 1805-1816
- 28th (North Gloucestershire) Regiment of Foot - 2 Battalions 1803-1814
- 29th (Worcestershire) Regiment of Foot - 2 Battalions 1795-1796
- 30th (Cambridgeshire) Regiment of Foot - 2 Battalions 1803-1817
- 31st (Huntingdonshire) Regiment of Foot - 2 Battalions 1805-1814
- 32nd (Cornwall) Regiment of Foot - 2 Battalions 1804-1814
- 33rd (1st Yorkshire West Riding) Regiment of Foot - 1 Battalion
- 34th (Cumberland) Regiment of Foot - 2 Battalions 1805-1817
- 35th (Dorsetshire) Regiment of Foot - Renamed "Sussex" in 1805 - 2 Battalions 1799-1803, than again 1804-1817
- 36th (Herefordshire) Regiment of Foot - 2 Battalions 1804-1814
- 37th (North Hampshire) Regiment of Foot - 2 Battalions 1813-1817
- 38th (1st Staffordshire) Regiment of Foot - 2 Battalions 1804-1814
- 39th (East Middlesex) Regiment of Foot - Renamed "Dorsetshire" in 1807 - 2 Battalions 1803-1815
- 40th (the 2nd Somersetshire) Regiment of Foot - 2 Battalions 1799-1802 and 1804-1816
- 41st Regiment of Foot - 2 Battalions in 1813
- 42nd (Royal Highland) Regiment of Foot - 2 Battalions 1780-1786 and 1804-1812
- 43rd (Monmouthshire) Regiment of Foot - Became Light Infantry in 1803 - 2 Battalions 1804-1817
- 44th (East Essex) Regiment of Foot - 2 Battalions 1803-1816
- 45th (Nottinghamshire) Regiment of Foot - 2 Battalions 1804-1814
- 46th (South Devonshire) Regiment of Foot - 2 Battalions 1800-1802
- 47th (Lancashire) Regiment of Foot - 2 Battalions 1794-1795 and 1803-1815
- 48th (Northamptonshire) Regiment of Foot - 2 Battalion 1803-1814
- 49th (Princess Charlotte of Wales's) (Hertfordshire) Regiment of Foot - 2 Battalions 1813-1814
- 50th (West Kent) Regiment of Foot - 2 Battalions 1804-1814
- 51st (2nd Yorkshire West Riding) Regiment of Foot - Became Light Infantry in 1809, King's Own 1812 - 2 Battalions 1804-1814
- 52nd (Oxfordshire) Regiment of Foot - Became Light Infantry 1803 - 2 Battalions 1799-1803 and 1804-1815
- 53rd (Shropshire) Regiment of Foot - 2 Battalions 1803-1817
- 54th (West Norfolk) Regiment of Foot - 2 Battalions 1800-1802
- 55th (Westmorland) Regiment of Foot - 1 Battalion
- 56th (West Essex) Regiment of Foot - 2 Battalions 1804-1817 3 Battalions 1813-1814
- 57th (West Middlesex) Regiment of Foot - 2 Battalions 1803-1815
- 58th (Rutlandshire) Regiment of Foot - 2 Battalions 1804-1815
- 59th (2nd Nottinghamshire) Regiment of Foot - 2 Battalions 1804-1816
- 60th (Royal American) Regiment of Foot - 8 Battalions from 1813-1819
- 61st (South Gloucestershire) Regiment of Foot - 2 Battalions 1803-1814
- 62nd (Wiltshire) Regiment of Foot - 2 Battalions 1799-1802 and 1804-1816
- 63rd (West Suffolk) Regiment of Foot - 2 Battalions 1804-1814
- 64th (2nd Staffordshire) Regiment of Foot - ???? No information found..
- 65th (2nd Yorkshire, North Riding) Regiment of Foot - 1 Battalion
- 66th (Berkshire) Regiment of Foot - 2 Battalions 1803-1816
- 67th (South Hampshire) Regiment of Foot - 2 Battalions 1803-1817
- 68th (Durham) Regiment of Foot - Light Infantry in 1812 - 2 Battalions 1800-1802
- 69th (South Lincolnshire) Regiment of Foot - 2 Battalions 1795-1796 and 1803-1816
- 70th (Surrey) Regiment of Foot - Became "Glasgow Lowland" in 1812 - 1 Battalion
- 71st (Highland) Regiment of Foot - Light Infantry in 1810 - Glasgow Highland in 1808, Glasgow Highland Light Infantry in 1809 Highland Light Infantry in 1810 - 2 Battalions 1778-1783 and 1804-1815
- 72nd Regiment of Foot - Became Seaforth 1778, Highland in 1786, 72nd in 1809 - 2 Battalions 1804-1816
- 73rd (Highland) Regiment of Foot - 2 Battalions 1809-1817
- 74th (Highland) Regiment of Foot - Lost Highland Status in 1809 - 1 Battalion
- 75th (Highland) Regiment of Foot - Lost Highland Status and dress in 1809 - 1 Battalion
- 76th (Hindustan) Regiment of Foot - Became Hindustan in 1806, last in 1812 - 1 Battalion
- 77th Regiment of Foot - Became East Middlesex in 1807 - 1 Battalion
- 78th (Ross-Shire Buffs Highlanders) Regiment of Foot - 2 Battalions 1793-1796 and 1804-1816
- 79th (Cameronian Highland Volunteers) Regiment of Foot - Cameron Highlanders in 1804 2 Battalions 1804-1815
- 80th (Staffordshire Volunteers) Regiment of Foot - Staffordshire Volunteers in 1802, 1 Battalion
- 81st Regiment of Foot (Loyal Lincoln Volunteers) - Loyal Lincoln Volunteers in 1803, 2 Battalions
- 82nd Regiment of Foot (Prince of Wales's Volunteers) - Prince of Wales's Volunteers in 1804, 2 Battalions- amalgamated with 40th Regiment of Foot in 1881 to form South Lancashire Regiment
- 83rd (County of Dublin) Regiment of Foot - 2 Battalions, 1804. Amalgamated with the 86th in 1881 to become the Royal Irish Rifles which in turn became The Royal Ulster Rifles
- 84th (York and Lancaster) Regiment of Foot - 2 Battalions 1794-1795 and 1808-1819
- 85th Regiment of Foot (Bucks Volunteers) - 2 Battalions in 1801. Reduced to 1 Battalion in 1802.
- 86th (Royal County Down) Regiment of Foot - 2 Battalions 1813-14.
- 87th (Royal Irish Fusiliers) Regiment of Foot - 2 Battalions 1804-1817
- 88th Regiment of Foot (Connaught Rangers) - 2 Battalions 1805-1816
- 89th (Princess Victoria's) Regiment of Foot - 2 Battalions 1804-1816
- 90th Regiment of Foot (Perthshire Volunteers) - 2 Battalions 1794-1795 and 1804-1817
- 91st (Argyllshire Highlanders) Regiment of Foot - 2 Battalions from 1804-1815
- 92nd (Gordon Highlanders) Regiment of Foot - 2 Battalions from 1803-1814
- 93rd (Sutherland Highlanders) Regiment of Foot - 2 Battalions from 1813-1816
- 94th Regiment of Foot - called ‘The Scotch Brigade’ until 1802.
- Rifle Brigade (The Prince Consort's Own) - formed in 1800 as the Experimental Corps of Rifles, renamed the 95th Regiment of Foot (Rifles) in 1803. 2nd Battalion raised in 1805. 3rd Battalion raised in 1809.
- 96th Regiment of Foot -
- 100th (Prince Regent's County of Dublin) Regiment of Foot - 1 Battalion raised in Ireland in 1804. Transferred to North America in 1805, Prince Regent descriptor granted in 1813. Disbanded in 1818.

== Colonial / Foreign ==
The British Army raised several colonial and foreign units, including the following:

=== Canada ===
- 1st (Queen's Rangers) Regiment - 2 Companies [Formed in Canada]

=== West Indies ===
There were twelve West Indies regiment in British service during the time of the Napoleonic Wars.

=== Menorca ===
- The Minorca Regiment - formed on Menorca
- Franc Tireur Corses - company strength, Menorca

=== Africa ===
- Fraser's Corps of Infantry - 2 Companies, later increased to 12 [Formed in West Africa]

=== India ===
- Regiment de Meuron (First raised in Switzerland in 1781 in the service of the Dutch East India Company (VOC), defected and entered British service in 1795 in Ceylon)

== Artillery ==
Royal Horse Artillery

- A (Chestnut Troop) Battery
- B Battery
- C Battery
- D Battery
- E Battery
- F (Sphinx) Battery

Royal Artillery

- 9 (Plassey) Battery
- 20 Battery
- 30 Battery (Rogers's Company)
- 42 (Alem Hamza) Battery
- 49 Battery
- 53 (Louisburg) Battery
- Royal Irish Artillery
