= Devil's Tongue Battery =

Artillery battery in Gibraltar

- Part of Fortifications of Gibraltar
- Gibraltar
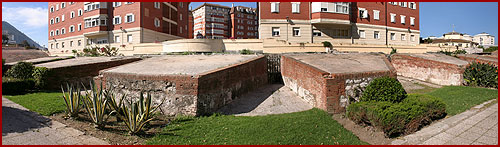
- View of the brick and limestone embrasures that were once part of this coastal battery (showing the extent of more recent land reclamation on either side)

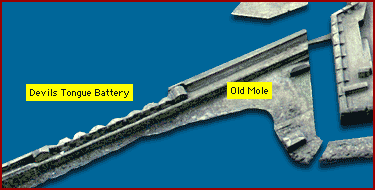
- Devil's Tongue Battery as depicted in the scale Model of Gibraltar (1865) (now at the Gibraltar Museum

Site information
- Type: Artillery battery
- Owner: Mostly private being occupied by a garden centre/florist
- Controlled by: Gibral-Flora
- Open to the public: Can be viewed from the outside

Location
- Location in Gibraltar
- Coordinates: 36.146346°N 5.355299°W

Site history
- Materials: Brick; Limestone

Devil's Tongue Battery was an artillery battery in the British Overseas Territory of Gibraltar. The battery could overlook the harbour but the remains are now surrounded by reclaimed land.

== Description ==
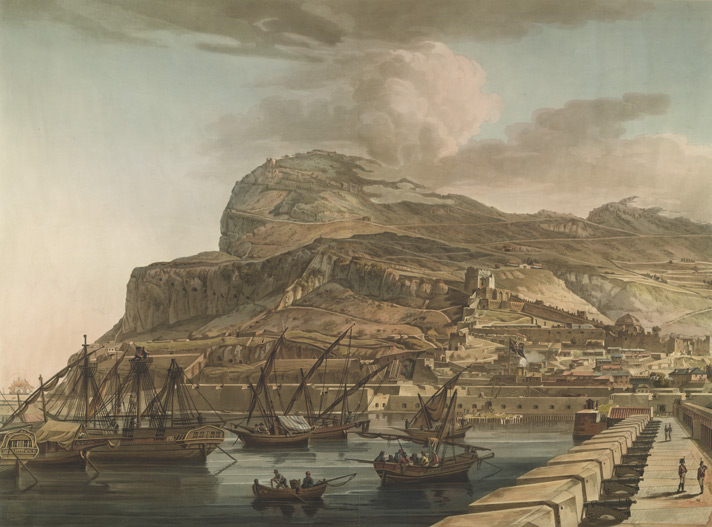
"A North View of the Rock of Gibraltar from the Spanish Lines" (1782) by T. Malton jnr showing the battery in the foreground

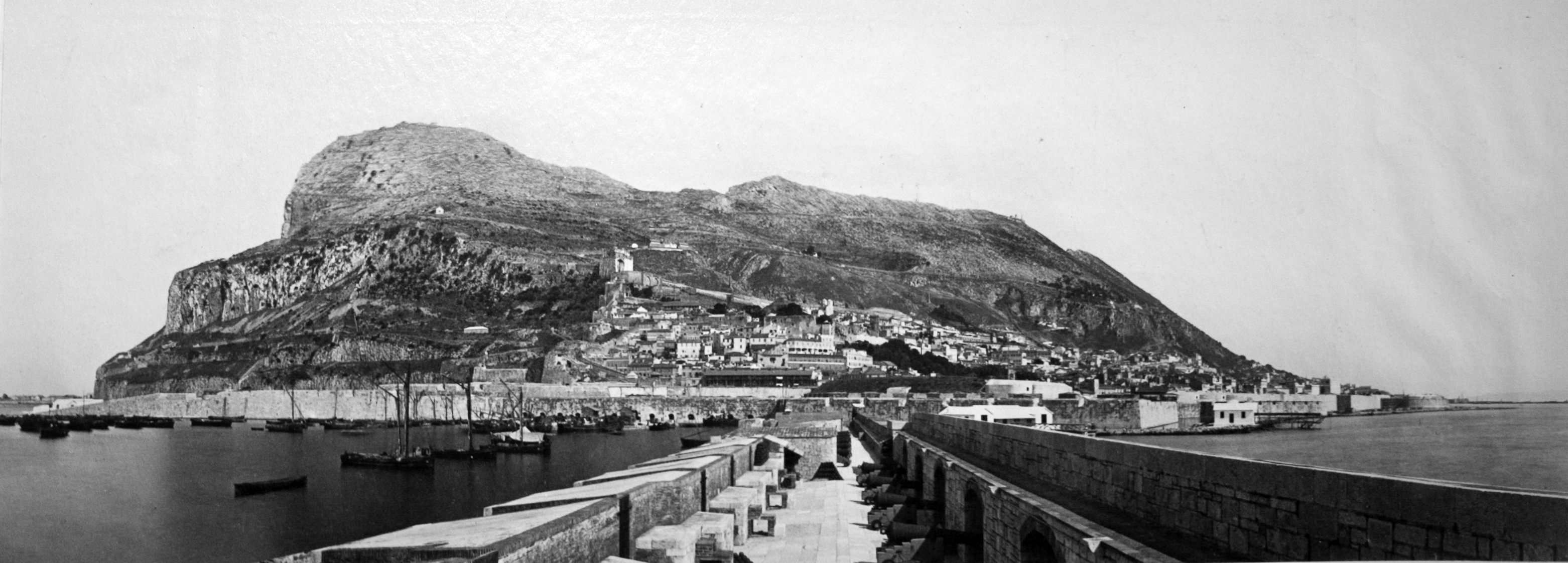
Panoramic photograph of the Rock of Gibraltar taken from Devil's Tongue Battery in 1879

Devil's Tongue is one of the older batteries which was located on the Old Mole so that it could offer additional help to the Landport defences. This defence was required to protect Gibraltar from invasion from the mainland across the isthmus. A battery was being used here by the British in 1727 and was used during the Great Siege of Gibraltar (1779–1783). In 1761 additional batteries were planned by General John Thomas Jones who had one of the batteries named after him.

In 1848, John Fox Burgoyne, the Inspector-General of Fortifications advised on the fortifications of Gibraltar making recommendations that the guns on the Devil's Tongue Battery be directed into Gibraltar Harbour. At the time the harbour was immediately south of this battery. Significant land reclamation took place in later years around the battery.

The battery is on the south eastern end of the Old Mole which is the oldest part of the North Mole at Gibraltar Harbour although the battery is now home to a garden centre on one side and Waterport Avenue on the other. This is because of the large amount of land reclamation that means these coastal fortifications are now inland. The brick-built embrasures on the battery are substantially intact and they are classed as Class A listed building as designated by the Government of Gibraltar's Gibraltar Heritage Trust Act of 1989.
