= Europa Point Lighthouse =

Lighthouse on the southeastern tip of Gibraltar

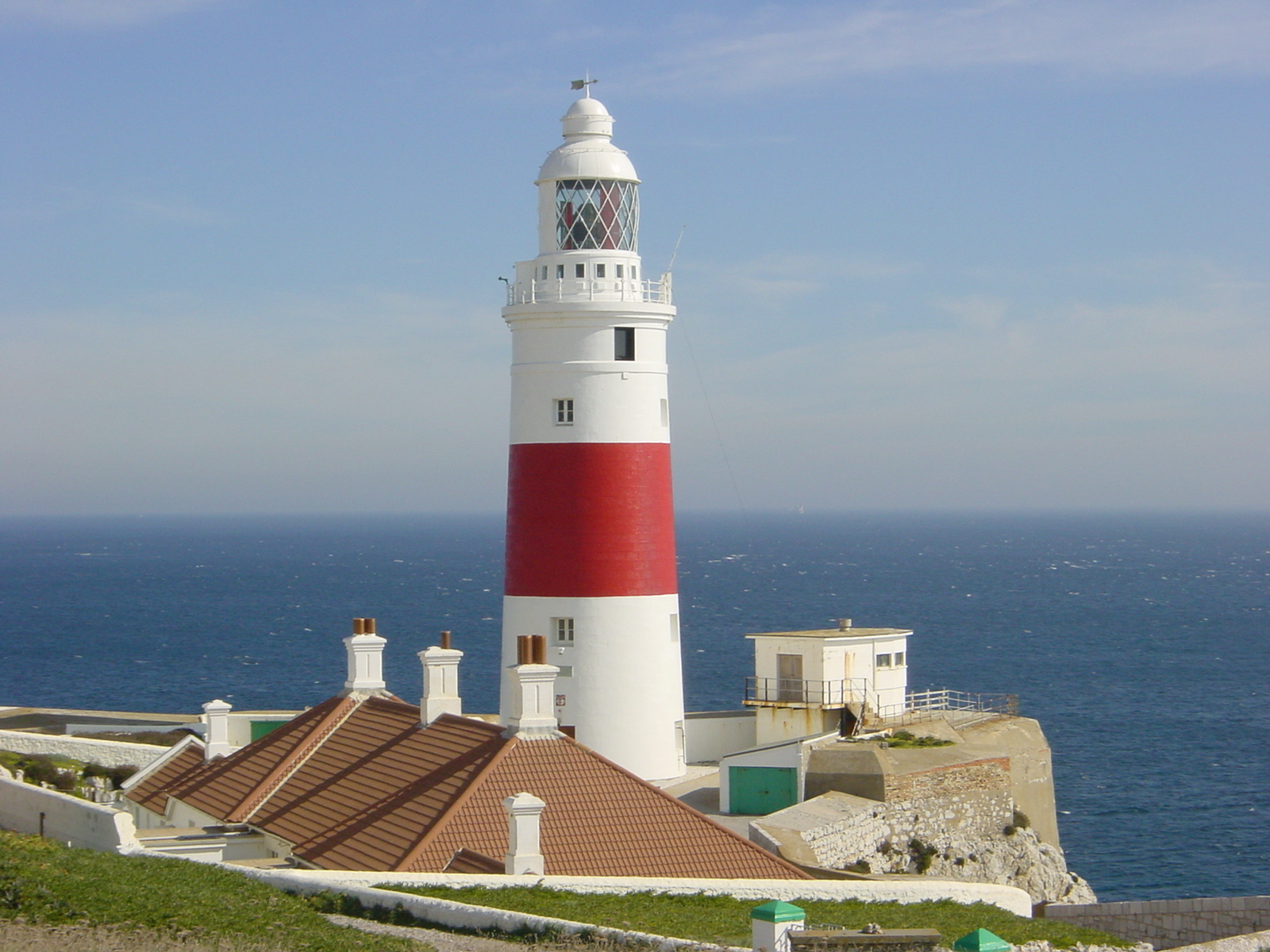
- Europa Point Lighthouse at Gibraltar, with former keepers' cottages to the left and the former fog-horn house to the right
- Location: Europa Point, Gibraltar, United Kingdom
- Coordinates: 36°06′35″N 5°20′41″W

Tower
- Constructed: 1838
- Construction: masonry (tower)
- Automated: February 1994
- Height: 20 m (66 ft)
- Shape: cylindrical tower with balcony and lantern
- Markings: white (tower), white (lantern), stripe (red, horizontal direction)
- Operator: Trinity House (1838–)

Light
- First lit: 1 August 1841
- Focal height: 49 m (161 ft)
- Lens: Single-tier LED
- Intensity: 72,216 candela
- Range: 18 nmi (33 km; 21 mi)
- Characteristic: Iso W 10s

The Europa Point Lighthouse, also referred to as the Trinity Lighthouse at Europa Point and the Victoria Tower or La Farola in Llanito, is a lighthouse at Europa Point, on the southeastern tip of the British Overseas Territory of Gibraltar, on the southern end of the Iberian Peninsula, at the entrance to the Mediterranean Sea.

Europa Lighthouse was inaugurated on 1 August 1841 in a brief ceremony witnessed by about 10,000 people. The first upgrade of the lighthouse occurred in 1864, when the single-wick lamp was replaced with a Chance Brothers four-wick burner, with further changes in 1875 and in 1894 when the amount of light emitted was increased. A three incandescent mantle burner was added in 1905. Following further modernisation in the 20th century, the lighthouse was fully automated in 1994 and converted to LED operation in 2016.

Europa Point Lighthouse is operated by Trinity House. The cylindrical tower is painted white, with a wide red horizontal band in the middle. The lighthouse has a height of 20 metres (66 ft) and is 49 metres (161 ft) above the high-water mark.

== History ==
Also known as the Trinity Lighthouse at Europa Point and the Victoria Tower, the Europa Point Lighthouse, of classic British design, first underwent construction in 1838. Sir Alexander George Woodford (1782–1870), Governor and Commander-in-Chief of Gibraltar, set the first stone for the lighthouse's foundation on 26 April 1838, with the aid of the Masonic Order of Gibraltar. The inscription read:

This foundation-stone of a light-house, erected by order of the colonial government of her Majesty Victoria, Queen of Great Britain and Ireland and their dependencies, in the first year of her reign, was laid on the 26th day of April, A.D. 1838, A.L. 5838, with military and masonic honours, by his Excellency Major-General Sir Alexander Woodford, K.C.B. &c. governor and commander-in-chief of the town and garrison of Gibraltar, assisted by the Rev. W. E. T. Burrow, D.D. F.R.S. Provincial Grand Master, for the protection of Mediterranean commerce, the saving of human life, and the honour of the British name.

A brief ceremony commemorated the event, which was witnessed by about 10,000 people. Construction of the lighthouse was completed in 1841, and was inaugurated according to schedule on 1 August that year. The first lighting of the Europa Point Lighthouse drew an audience of more than 2,000 people.

To navigate the Bay of Gibraltar prior to the opening of the lighthouse sailors were dependent on the light emitted by the Shrine of Our Lady of Europe, Roman Catholic shrine, which was originally a mosque built after the victory of King Ferdinand IV of Spain over the Moors at the 1309 siege. They expressed their gratitude by leaving supplies of oil at the chapel, which also encouraged the continued burning of the lights.

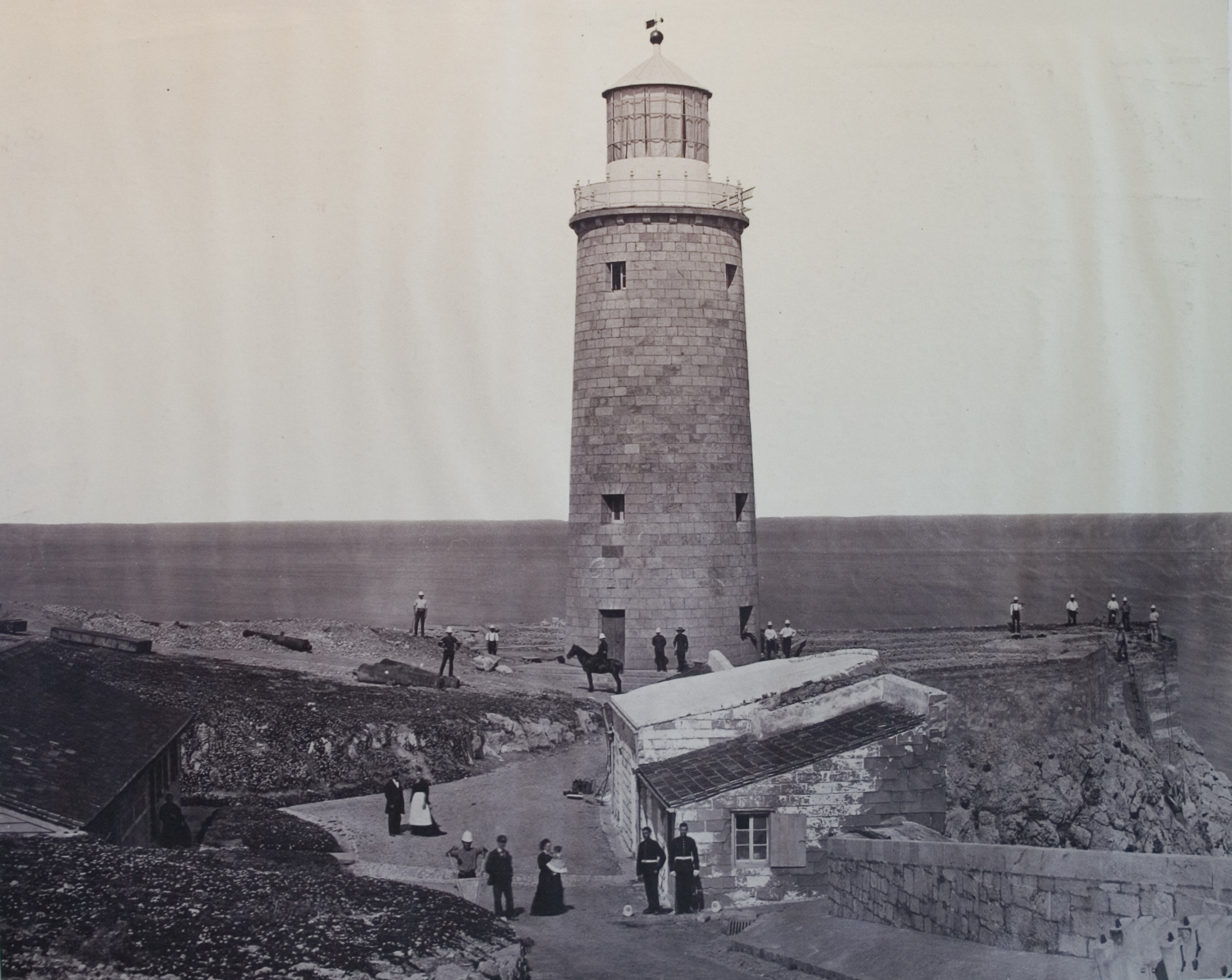
Europa Point Lighthouse in 1879

At the time of the opening of the lighthouse in 1841, a fixed light was emitted by an oil lamp with one wick. The intensity of the light was increased by a large (first-order) optic by Cookson & Co., combining a main dioptric fixed lens with upper and lower tiers of catoptric mirrors. On 25 April 1843, lighting was upgraded to improve visibility from Sandy Bay, and in 1854, the lighthouse had a reported visibility of 16 miles (26 km).

Repairs and alterations were made to the lighthouse in 1863-64 by engineer Henry Norris, when the single-wick lamp was replaced with a Chance Brothers four-wick burner, and a new, much-improved optic was provided (a first-order fixed catadioptric, also by Chance Brothers). The improvements included provision of a red arc of light over the hazardous Pearl Rock region: in order to maintain the intensity of the red light out as far as Pearl Rock (which was 6 miles away), 9-foot high vertical reflecting prisms were used to redirect light from the landward side (where it would otherwise be wasted) back through the red sector. An additional upgrade was made in 1875 when the lamp was switched out for a four-wick mineral oil burner.

In 1894, the lighthouse was further altered to increase the amount of light emitted. The four-wick burner was exchanged for a Douglass burner with eight wicks and the lantern was improved; the power of the light was thereby increased to 35,000 candela. The characteristic of the light changed from fixed to occulting. An explosive fog signal was also introduced, with two quick blasts every five minutes. The eight-wick burner was exchanged for a three incandescent mantle burner in 1905. In 1923, the burner was replaced by a Hood petroleum vapour burner with one mantle.

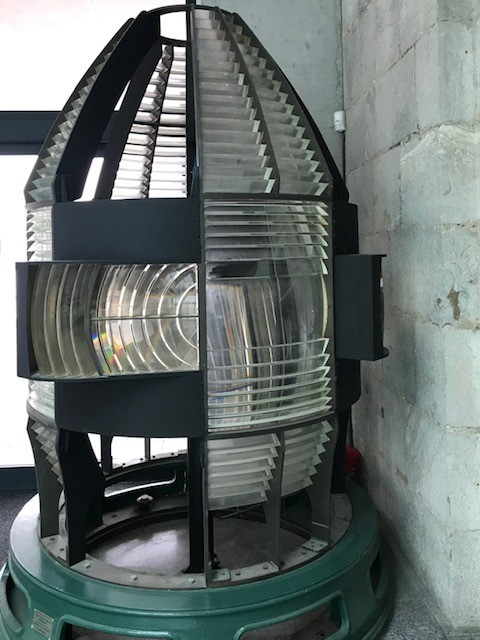
The 1956 optic on display (after it was removed from the lighthouse).

Later, between 1954 and 1956, further extensive changes were made and the introduction of electric lighting further improved visibility. As part of the upgrade, a much more powerful, revolving lens system was introduced for the primary optic: a Stone-Chance 2nd Order Catadioptric optic. By a complex arrangement of lenses and shades, the optic displayed an isophase white light (5 seconds on, 5 seconds off) when seen from most directions, but was seen as a red occulting light (on for 5.8 seconds, off for 4.2 seconds) within the red sector, covering the Pearl Rock. In addition, at this time, a separate red sector light was added, which projected a fixed red beam across the same sector from a room below the main light. To accommodate the new equipment, the height of the tower was increased by 6 feet (1.8 m). Also, as part of this upgrade, a set of SuperTyfon foghorns was installed, mounted on their own engine-house, alongside the tower; they sounded one blast every 20 seconds.

The lighthouse was fully automated in February 1994. The extant optics were kept, but complemented with a three-position lampchanger. The foghorn was changed to an electric model, with a directional 500 Hz emitter stack that was installed on the gallery of the lantern room.

In 2016, as part of a comprehensive upgrade to the light and its electric systems, the revolving optic was removed (along with the red arc, with its vertical prisms, and the subsidiary sector light). It was replaced with a pair of all-round white single-tier LED lanterns displaying an isophase characteristic (one providing the main light, the other serving as a standby). At the same time the fog signal was discontinued. The decommissioned 1950s optic was then presented to the newly established University of Gibraltar, where it has been placed on display.

== Description ==
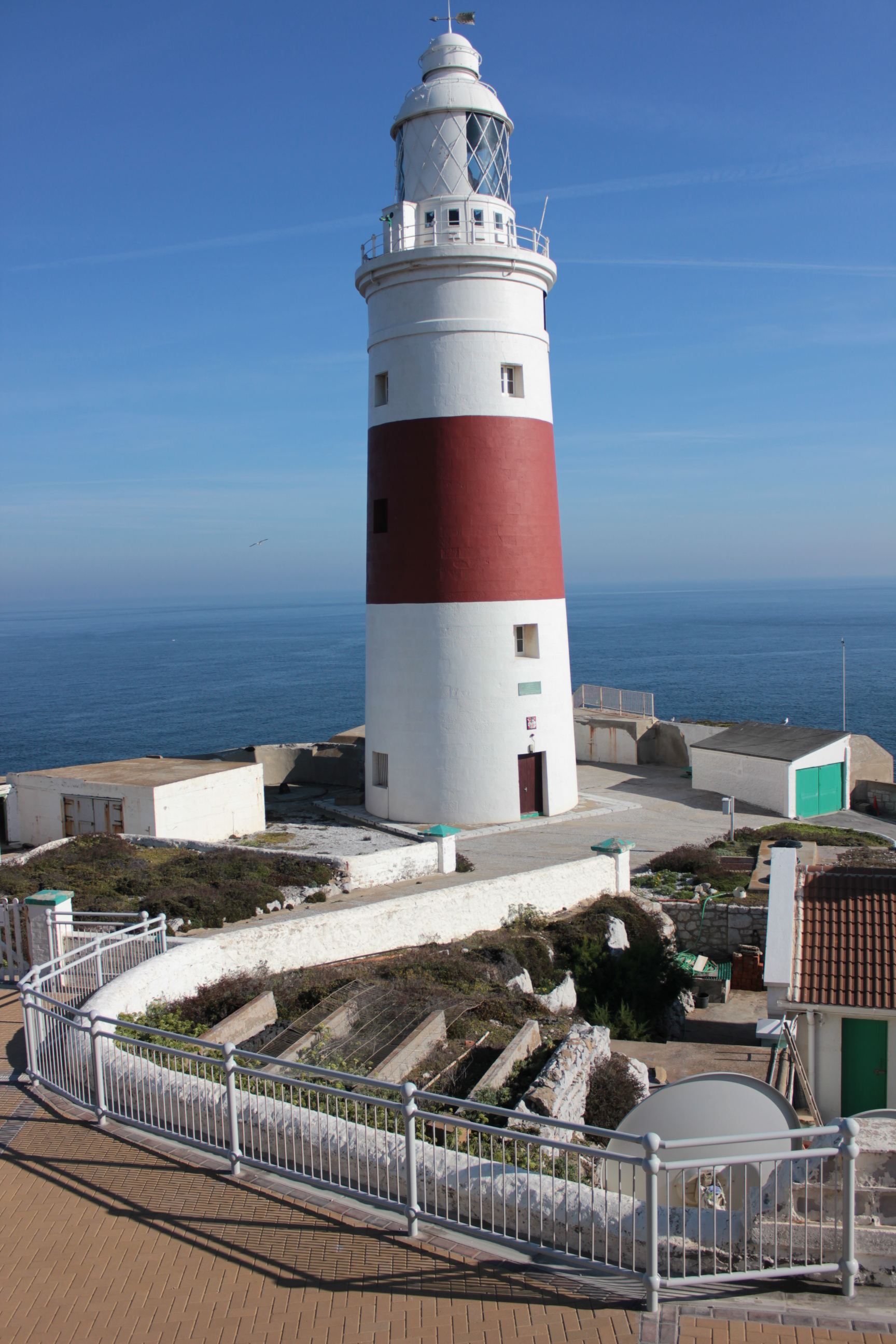
Europa Point Lighthouse

The lighthouse, which remains active, is strategically located at the southeastern tip of the Rock of Gibraltar at Europa Point, between the Atlantic and Mediterranean, rising to 49 metres (161 ft) above the high-water mark. The Mediterranean is to the east, the Bay of Gibraltar to the northwest, and the Strait of Gibraltar to the southwest.

The lighthouse has a 19 metres (62 ft) masonry tower with lantern and gallery; the tower is painted white, with a single wide red horizontal band in the middle. It is locally known as "La Farola" (literally 'lamppost' in Spanish) in Llanito, Gibraltar's spoken vernacular.

== Administration ==
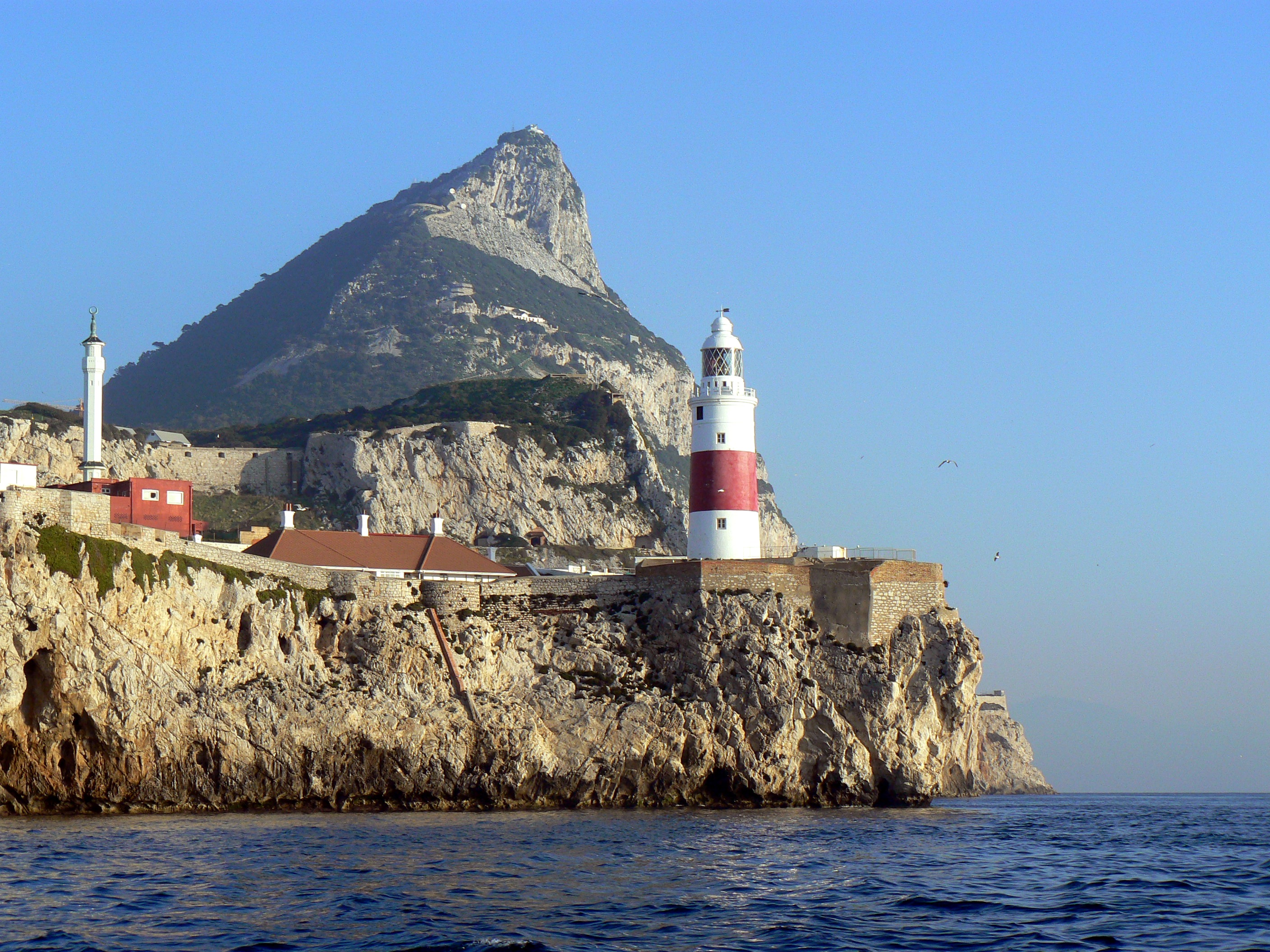
Europa Point Lighthouse and Rock of Gibraltar, as viewed from Strait of Gibraltar

The lighthouse is the only such building outside of the British Isles which is operated by Trinity House, a lighthouse agency based in England. Accordingly, it is also referred to as the Trinity Lighthouse. Trinity House was made responsible for building and operating the Europa Point Lighthouse by the Gibraltar Lighthouse, etc. Act 1838. In addition, section 634 of the Merchant Shipping Act 1894 resulted in Trinity House becoming the general lighthouse authority for Gibraltar. The site of the lighthouse is managed by the Government of Gibraltar, and monitoring of the lighthouse is through a reporting station connected by telephone to the Gibraltar Port Office. The United Kingdom Hydrographic Office Admiralty Digital Lists of Lights (ADLL) number for the Europa Point Lighthouse is D2438. The United States National Geospatial-Intelligence Agency (NGA) number is 4220.

Soon after World War II, amateur radio, also called ham radio, made its appearance in Gibraltar. The Gibraltar Amateur Radio Society, with its headquarters on Coaling Island, operates from the lighthouse once annually, during the third weekend of August. The annual International Lighthouse and Lightship Weekend has as its goal in Gibraltar of putting the Europa Point Lighthouse on the air, using the call sign, ZB2LGT. The Amateur Radio Lighthouse Society (ARLHS) number for the lighthouse is GIB-001.

== See also ==
- Lighthouses in Gibraltar
