= North Mole Elbow Battery =

Artillery battery in Gibraltar

The North Mole Elbow Battery was an artillery battery situated on Gibraltar's Old Mole (now the North Mole), at the point where the mole turns north. It is recorded as mounting three 12-pdr guns in 1903. It mounted a Bofors 40 mm anti-aircraft gun during the Second World War along with a 6-pdr gun on a twin mounting for coastal defence purposes. At the end of the mole, another 6-pdr gun was installed on a twin mounting.

== Bibliography ==
- Hughes, Quentin; Migos, Athanassios (1995). Strong as the Rock of Gibraltar. Gibraltar: Exchange Publications. OCLC 48491998.
