= North Mole, Gibraltar Harbour =

Sector of a major port

Coordinates: 36.1485°N 5.3652°W

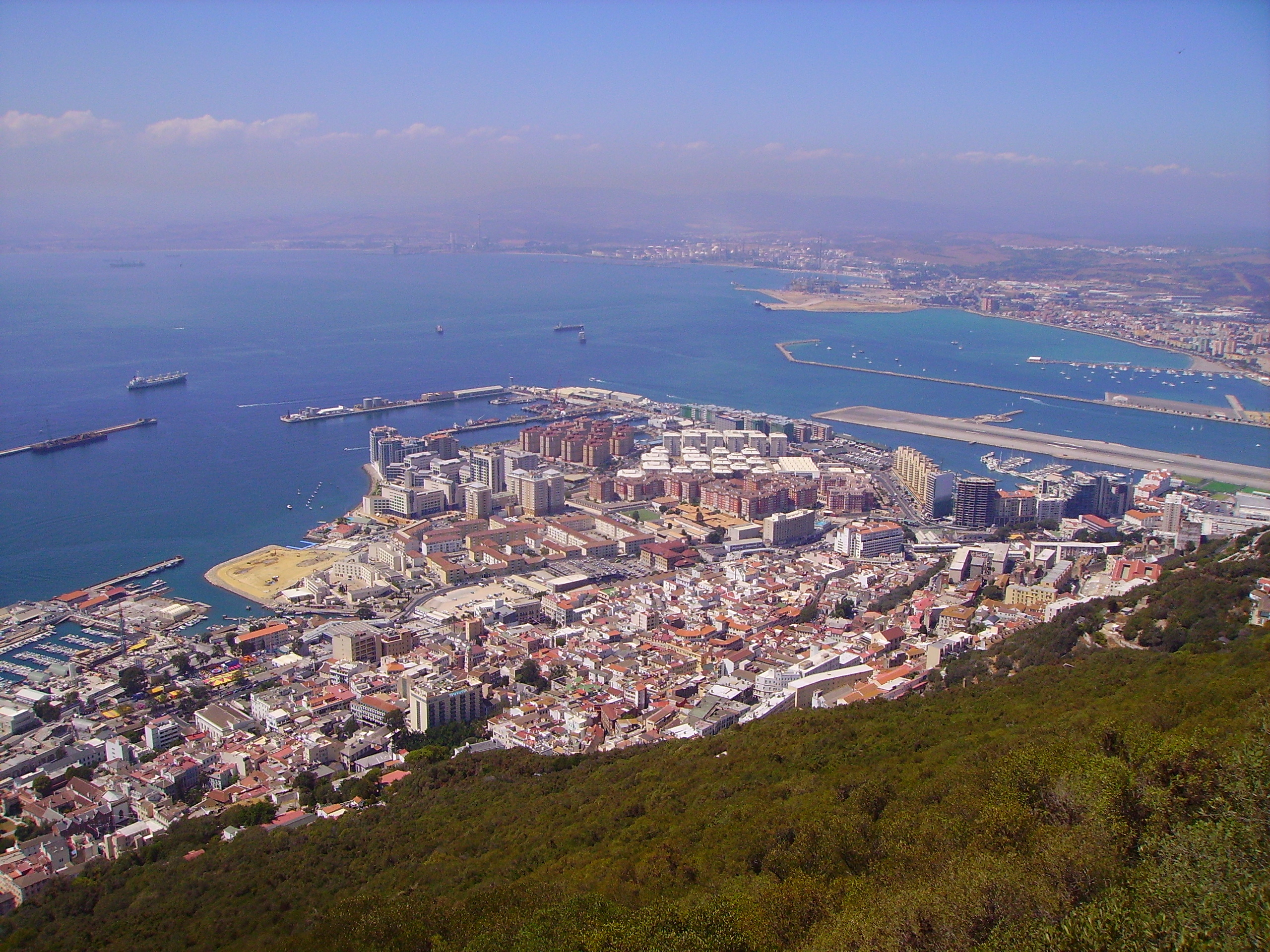
View of the North Mole and its Western Arm at Gibraltar Harbour, from the Rock of Gibraltar, with Detached Mole at far left

Gibraltar Harbour with North Mole, Detached Mole, and South Mole

The North Mole is a breakwater located in the northern section of Gibraltar Harbour, in the British Overseas Territory of Gibraltar, at the southern end of the Iberian Peninsula. The North Mole, with the rest of harbour, is just north of the east entrance to the Strait of Gibraltar. The breakwater was formerly known as the Commercial Mole, and is the site of the commercial port in the harbour. It was the consequence of a late nineteenth century plan by the British Admiralty to create a modern dockyard and large defensive harbour in Gibraltar.

== Infrastructure ==
The North Mole at Gibraltar Harbour (pictured), in the British Overseas Territory of Gibraltar, at the southern end of the Iberian Peninsula, is one of a trio of breakwaters (shown on map) that provides protection to the harbour, in addition to that which results from the presence of the Rock of Gibraltar on its east side. The North Mole is positioned at the northern and western aspects of the northern section of the harbour, which is located just north of the east entrance to the Strait of Gibraltar. The L-shaped breakwater includes a Western Arm which runs south toward the Detached Mole, and measures 500 metres (1,600 ft) in length. The northern section of the harbour features the commercial port, which has a total length of almost 2,300 metres (7,500 ft) of quay on the North Mole (including its Western Arm) for cruise ships, cargo handling, and bunkering. Fifteen berths are available, including six on the Western Arm and two on an extension jetty.

The south end of the Western Arm of the North Mole, its "D" Head, is the site of the Gibraltar North Mole Lighthouse (location shown on map). The black, octagonal, latticework tower is constructed of cast-iron. Its light characteristic is a quick, flashing red light, and it has a range of five nautical miles. The Elbow of the North Mole, its "E" Head, is the site of the Gibraltar North Mole Elbow Lighthouse. The grey, square, skeletal tower includes a round harbour control room. The light characteristic is a fixed red light, with a range of five nautical miles. Both lighthouses are operated by the Gibraltar Port Authority.

== Early history ==
The North Mole was formerly known as the Commercial Mole. It was a late nineteenth and early twentieth century extension of the Old Mole (shown on map), which was begun in 1618, and its extension, Devil's Tongue Battery, which was constructed between 1779 and 1783. By 1895, the government had drawn up plans to modernise Gibraltar Harbour. They included construction of a dry dock at the New Mole Parade, which had been built in 1620. The 1895 plan also included enclosing Gibraltar Harbour by extending the New Mole (shown on map) and constructing a Detached Mole. At that time, the method of enclosing the northern end of the harbour had not yet been decided and was a matter of some controversy.

The extensive changes to Gibraltar Harbour were largely financed through Britain's Naval Works Act 1895 (58 & 59 Vict. c. 35). The plan that met with final approval of the Admiralty included construction of a dockyard and a modern defensive harbour, safe from torpedo attack. The Commercial Mole was an integral component of that defensive harbour as it formed its northern boundary, and was also planned to serve the commercial needs of Gibraltar. Some of the cost of that breakwater was shouldered by the colony of Gibraltar. The Commercial Mole was constructed of rubble stone and extended west from the area of the Waterport Wharf, Old Mole, and Devil's Tongue. The breakwater included five jetties which extended north and south; it ended in the Western Arm which paralleled the jetties. The jetties and Western Arm were lined with a concrete wharf wall. By 1902, much of the construction of the new Gibraltar Harbour had been completed, although portions were still under construction, including the extension of the New Mole. While the Commercial Mole was intended to facilitate Gibraltar commerce, by 1911 it was primarily used by the navy as a quay for destroyers.

== Recent history ==
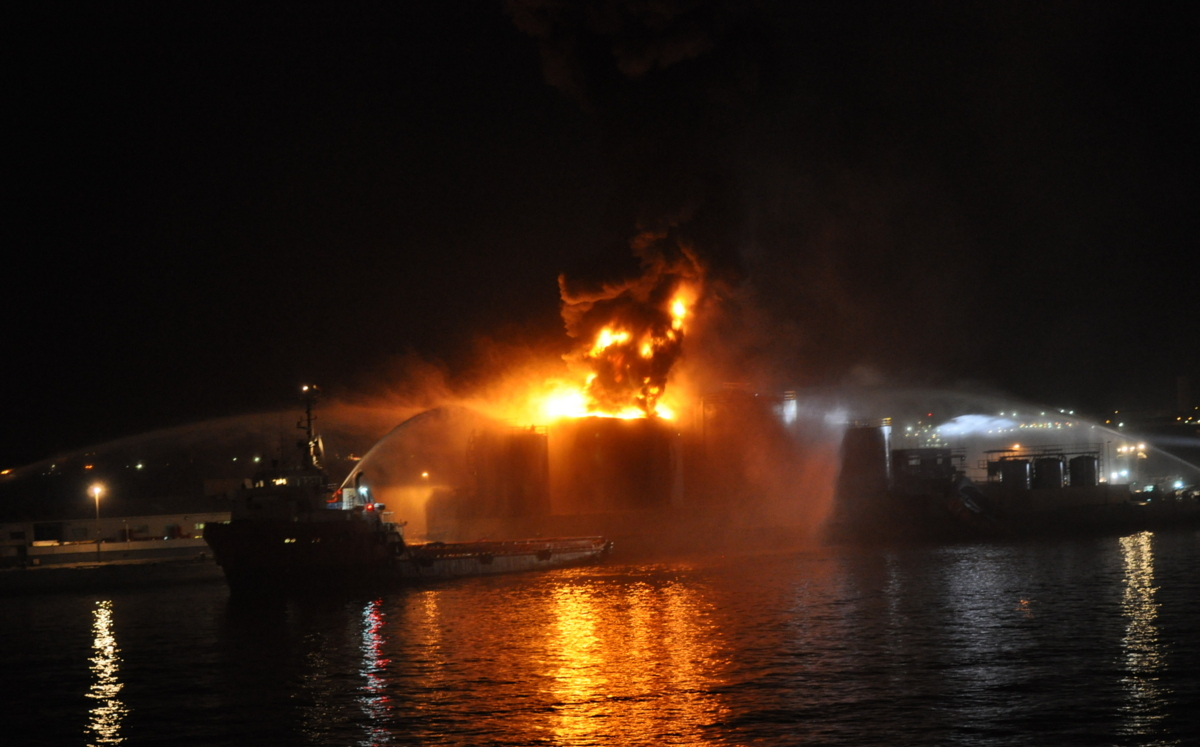
Oil sullage tank continues burning through the night

On the afternoon of 31 May 2011, the North Mole at Gibraltar Harbour was the site of an explosion involving an oil storage tank. Two workers had been welding on top of the tank. In addition to injuries sustained by the workers, one of whom was extensively burned, there were also injuries suffered by twelve passengers on the cruise ship Independence of the Seas, which had been berthed at the North Mole. An adjacent tank caught fire that evening, which required evacuation of the land-based fire fighters, limiting access to the fire from the sea. Following the fire, concern was expressed about the availability of adequate supplies of fire-fighting foam prior to the blaze at the North Mole.

On 8 June 2012, a bunkering accident off the North Mole resulted in an oil spill, with the release of three tons of fuel into the sea. The refuelling operation had involved the ship Frio Dolphin and the bunker tanker Vemaoil XX. The Gibraltar Oil Spill Contingency Plan was activated and, by the following day, most of the spilled oil had been contained.
