= South Mole, Gibraltar Harbour =

Breakwater in Gibraltar

Coordinates: 36°7′47.34″N 5°21′38.15″W

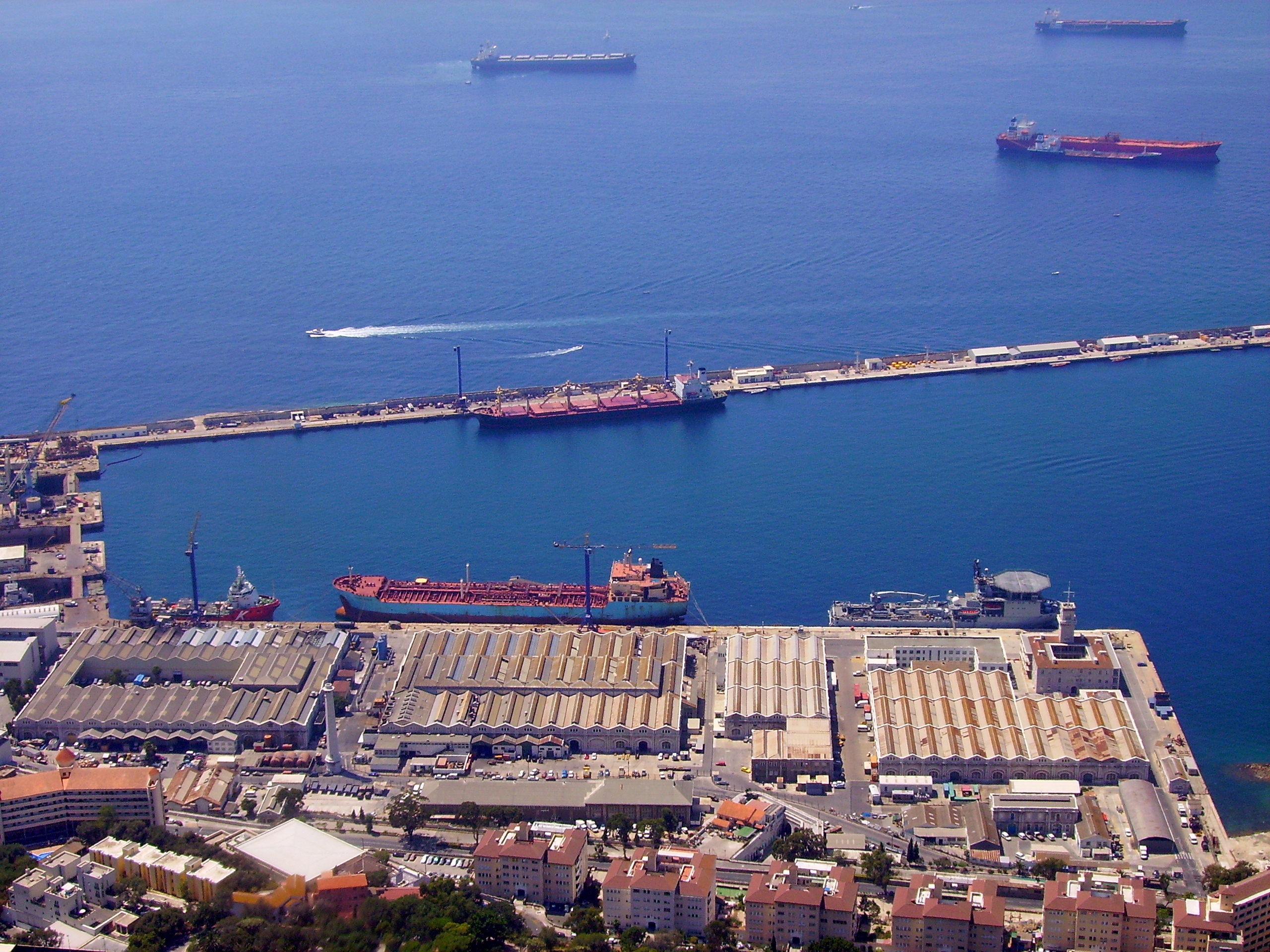
View of the South Mole at Gibraltar Harbour from the Rock of Gibraltar

The South Mole is a breakwater located in the southern section of Gibraltar Harbour, in the British Overseas Territory of Gibraltar, at the southern end of the Iberian Peninsula. Previously known as the New Mole and New Mole Extension, the South Mole, with the rest of harbour, is just north of the east entrance to the Strait of Gibraltar.

== History ==
Gibraltar Harbour with North Mole, Detached Mole, and South Mole

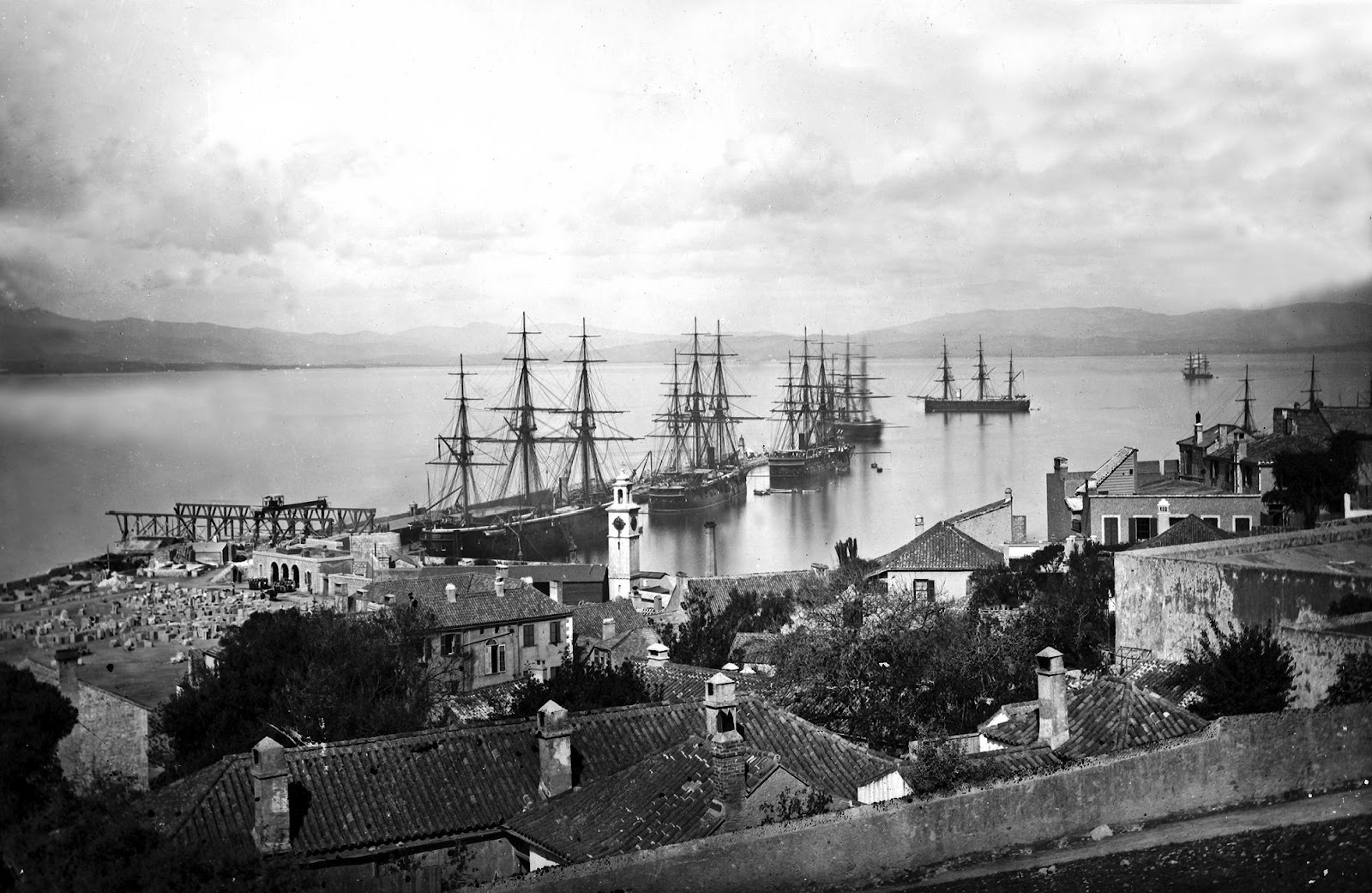
The "New" Mole in the 1890s.

The South Mole at Gibraltar Harbour is one of a trio of breakwaters that provides protection to the harbour, in addition to that which results from the presence of the Rock of Gibraltar on its east side. The South Mole is positioned at the southwestern aspect of the harbour, and is 1,100 feet (340 m) in length. The Gibdock shipyard and Royal Naval base are also in the southern section of the harbour, the wharfage of the shipyard including 435 metres (1,427 ft) of the South Mole. Repair berths along the breakwater can accommodate vessels up to 150,000 deadweight tonnage (dwt). During construction in the 1880s, a railway and two new tunnels were created to take large quantities of quarried stone to assist in the Mole's creation. One of these tunnels was by Camp Bay and the other was under the Parson's Lodge Battery.

The north end of the South Mole, its "A" Head, is the site of the Gibraltar South Mole Lighthouse. The location gives the tower its alternate name of the Gibraltar "A" Head Lighthouse. Its light characteristic is a quick, flashing white light, with a range of fifteen nautical miles. The black, cast-iron, skeletal tower continues to be active as an aid to navigation and is operated by the Gibraltar Port Authority.

The south entrance to Gibraltar Harbour, between the "A" Head of the South Mole and the "B" Head of the Detached Mole, is controlled by the Queen's Harbourmaster. Berths used by US Navy ships on the South Mole include Piers 48, 49, and 50.

The South Mole was formerly known as the New Mole and New Mole Extension, to distinguish it from the Old Mole at the northeastern corner of the harbour. Construction of the New Mole was begun by the Spanish in 1620. It underwent extension a variety of times, eventually reaching a length of 1,400 feet (430 m). It was built of rubble stone. The New Mole Extension was added about the turn of the twentieth century. The 2,700 feet (820 m) extension, together with the New Mole length of 1,400 feet (430 m), resulted in a total length of 4,100 feet (1,200 m) for the New Mole and New Mole Extension together, by 1911. This is more than the length indicated by the Gibraltar Port Authority one hundred years later, in 2011. In 1916, the length of the south entrance to the harbour was reported to be 600 feet (180 m). At that time, coal stores lined almost the entire length of the South Mole.

== SS Rosslyn ==
In January 1916, the SS Rosslyn, a more than 3,600 ton steamship commanded by Captain William Fishey, departed from Liverpool, England. The ship was 340 feet long and built in 1902. After the ship's cargo was unloaded at Muros, Spain, the captain was directed to set a course for Gibraltar, where he was instructed to anchor off the South Mole, outside the harbour. After an uneventful week at anchor, the weather changed for the worse on 27 February 1916. The following day, gale-force winds repeatedly dashed the ship against the recently completed South Mole. Despite the efforts of tugs provided by the Royal Navy and the Gibraltar Harbour authority, the ship sank off the South Mole. The Gibraltar Chronicle of 1 March 1916 reported:

The Cardiff steamer Rosslyn, of 3,679 tons gross, in ballast, dragged her anchor on Monday afternoon and was driven by the South-West gale on to the new Mole Breakwater. The dangerous plight of the vessel was at once seen and two Government Tugs immediately went to her assistance and made several attempts to tow her off, but as the gale was increasing every moment, after taking off the crew, they gave up their efforts and brought the men safely to harbour. Owing to the battering received by the high seas, the Rosslyn foundered yesterday morning, only part of her masts being now visible above water.

The SS Rosslyn was the largest wreck in Gibraltar and is now a popular site with divers.
