= Port of Gibraltar =

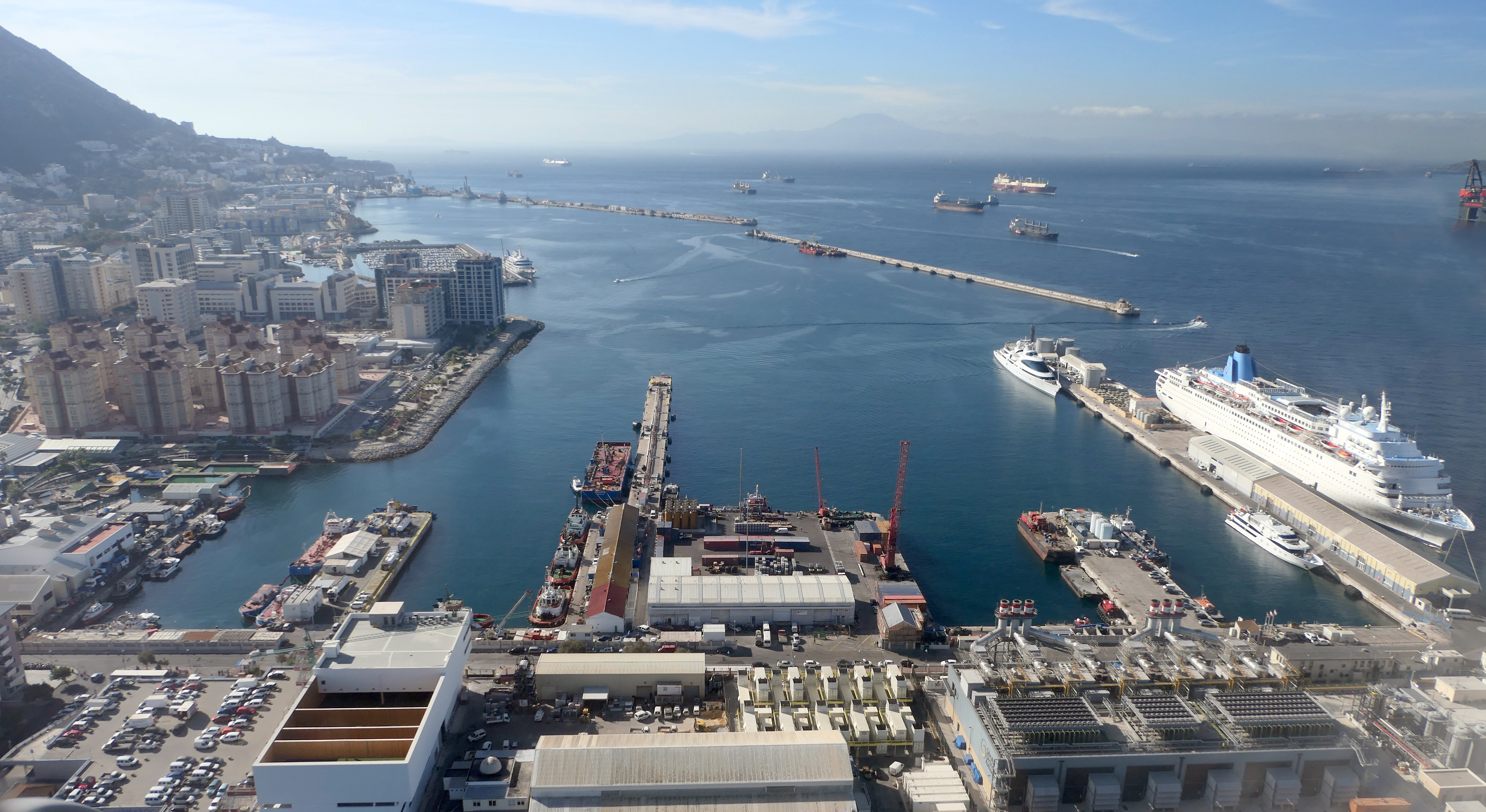
- Port of Gibraltar
- Interactive map of Port of Gibraltar

Location
- Country: Gibraltar
- Location: Eastern shores of the Bay of Gibraltar
- Coordinates: 36.1485°N 5.3652°W

Statistics
- Vessel arrivals: ▼10,350 sea ships (2011)
- Website www.gibraltarport.com

The Port of Gibraltar, also known as Gibraltar Harbour, is a seaport in the British Overseas Territory of Gibraltar. It was a strategically important location during the Napoleonic Wars and after 1869 served as a supply point for ships travelling to India through the Suez Canal. The harbour of Gibraltar was transformed in the nineteenth century as part of the British Government's policy of enabling the Royal Navy to defeat its next two largest rival navies combined. Both Gibraltar and Malta were to be made torpedo proof, and as a result the North and South Mole were extended and the Detached Mole was constructed. Three large dry docks were constructed and plans were available by 1894. Over 2,000 men were required and had to be billeted in old ships which had not been required since convict labour was abandoned. The demand for stone and sand necessitated building the Admiralty Tunnel right through the Rock of Gibraltar.

In 1903 Edward VII arrived to name the new No. 3 Dock of the new Gibraltar Harbour after himself. Queen Alexandra arrived in HMY Victoria and Albert in 1906 and the Prince and Princess of Wales the following year to name dock number two and then one after themselves.

Since 2009 the docks have been known as Gibdock.

== History ==
=== History of the Port ===
On 7 February 1588, in a letter to King Philip II of Spain, Captain Diego de Medrano, Squadron General of the Galleys of Spain and Portugal, reported that he had been sent by Álvaro de Bazán, Marquis of Santa Cruz, to oversee and attend to the construction of the port of Gibraltar, in addition to guarding its strait, in the late 16th century.

After Spain lost the Battle of Gibraltar in 1704, the port became part of Britain. In 1713, Article X of the Treaty of Utrecht was created to officially terminate any right Spain had for the city of Gibraltar. Once the agreement was completed Britain took full control of and possession of the port. The acquisition of Gibraltar was a tremendous victory for the British at the time allowing them to send ships from London to the Mediterranean cities. The port was seen as the doors that connected the Atlantic Ocean to the Mediterranean Sea. It was a great innovation, that allowed Britain to expand its trade. As a result, Queen Anne made the Port of Gibraltar a Free Port in February 1706; this simple decision had a major economic impact on the community. The act allowed any international vessels to trade without the need to pay any type of compensation tax. Trade was allowed without taxes allowing ships from North Africa, Turkey, Italy and any other nationality to trade their goods freely, making Gibraltar one of the most important ports in Europe, vessels from all over the world came to trade their goods.

=== First beginnings ===
In the mid-18th century the port of Gibraltar became a naval station for the Royal Navy. It served as an important tactical point, where a whole fleet of Navy vessels and 4,000 soldiers were assigned to the port, awaiting orders from their king (Constantine, S. & Blinkhorn, M 2009). Therefore, Britain having the port secured, turned their main focus to exploiting the port's economic assets. As a world trade point, the port of Gibraltar was exporting wine to different cities in the Mediterranean, making Britain millions of profit. This was their main product of exportation because the city had major wine factories. However, ships that were full with spices, cotton, and many other imports had as final destination the port of Gibraltar.The port allowed the distribution of goods to all over Europe making it the best efficient way to import and export to Europe and the Mediterranean Sea. As a result of being one of the busiest ports in the world this created jobs opportunities. This made the Port of Gibraltar the perfect place for immigrants looking for employment. As a major supply link the port was required to have large labour force to discharge fresh products such as Beef and Mutton for the Britain troops that were imported from the city Tetuan, in Morocco (Constantine, S. & Blinkhorn, M 2009). Therefore, any ship from any nation, including, remarkably, those with Britain might even be at war, were totally free to trade with Gibraltar provided that they brought in supplies. This was the reason that by the 1770s vessels from North America imported tobacco, Sugar, cotton, timber, dried cod, rum; rice and maize through the port of Gibraltar. As a result, imports were able to be distributed to all over Europe and Asia. As the centre of the international trade market, the port of Gibraltar had large amount of currency transaction during this trading. However, in many cases, the port was not only a trade point but an exchange of shipments that were re-exported to other ports in the world. This new innovation is what made the port Gibraltar one of the most successful ports up to this date.

=== New citizens ===
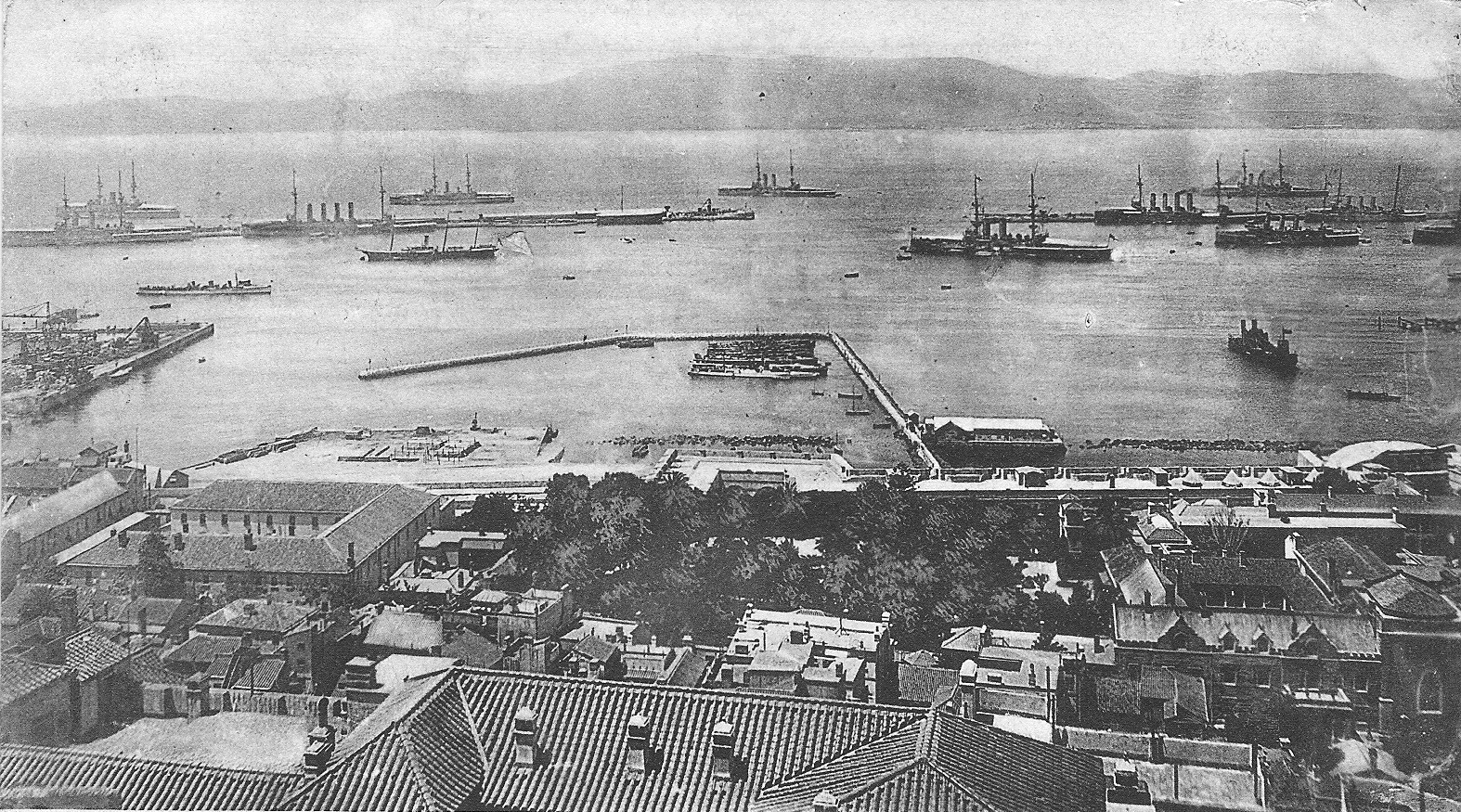
View of Gibraltar Harbour from the Upper Town c. 1905

The great success of the Port of Gibraltar caught the attention of many that were seeking escape from war and poverty. The port of Gibraltar was a worldwide trade point that was in need of labour. This created a revolution of immigrants looking to obtain a steady job where they could sustain their families. The port of Gibraltar was the indicated place for immigrants to find a job. As a result, in the following years around 1,500 families moved into Gibraltar which made a tremendously positive impact in the port. The immigrants were a great solution to the port, after most of the population left after Spain loss the territory leaving the city without any labour force that could sustain the port. An estimated 450 native citizens stayed in the port after Britain took over the port. As a result, the open positions were taken by the immigrants that came from all parts of Europe, North Africa and the Mediterranean. Therefore, re-repopulation was required not only to keep the port running but to maintain functioning of the city. Also, many immigrants were hired as servants for wealthy Britain families that were attracted to the new possession of the land and many decided to establish themselves in Gibraltar (Levey, D.2008) pg.39–45. Once the immigrants were established the port was able to keep up with the ships that came in out of the port on a daily basis. The workforce at the port was responsible for discharging and loading ships by hand. Therefore, the British government allowed the immigrants to establish themselves as part of the population to maintain the port running (Levey, D.2008) pg.39–45. Therefore, in the population cases of mix relationships started to happen a mixture of cultures was created. This was a new innovation for the century, which created controversy at the time because mix relationships were not acceptable (Levey, D.2008) pg.39–45. The main races that were located at the time in Gibraltar were British, Spanish, Genoes, Minorcan, Maltese, Jewish, and Indian. The intermarriage between these races created the new type of citizens known as Gibraltarians. Since then the Gibraltarians have stay in the port of Gibraltar making sure the port stayed functioning. Therefore, Gibraltarians make up 81.2% of the population, UK British 11.4% and non-British 7.4% making a total of 29,876 people up to this date.

=== Local business ===
The Port of Gibraltar in the 19th century was one of the main world trade points that allowed business opportunities for Gibraltarians. Therefore, in the 1800s many of those that worked at the port were able to become skilled commercial traders (Brown, J.2012) pg. 22–25. As commercial traders many of them distrusted goods around the city for the local population consumption. Also, these merchants were intermediaries between customers and the ships that carried the imports. Therefore, they had an important role in the port because they helped to expand the products brought to the port to third parties companies. The demand for international trade were always high because the port of Gibraltar received ships from all over the world making one of the few with the capability of bringing imports products from all over the world (Brown, J.2012) pg. 22–25. Therefore, the port of Gibraltar made an average merchant into important business man allowing them to build their own wealth by selling and trading products. One of the products that was in high demand was Tabaco and alcohol which, were distributed to Europe. A great opportunity that many Gibraltarians took since trading was such a great way to make money (Brown, J.2012) pg. 22–25. At the time the economy of the port was at its peak therefore, it resulted in many entrepreneurs that were looking to make a fortune and make them self-rich. As a result of these a new type entrepreneurs created new businesses at the port from repairing ships station, and bars. The new businesses helped the economy of the port of Gibraltar by creating jobs. However, another way Gibraltarians made money was smuggling contraband. This was one of the ways the port of Gibraltar was used many of merchants made their capital this way since they didn't pay taxes. The contraband business was the second operation in the port that made the most profit to the economy. It was big issues that both Spain and Gibraltar try to stop but many smugglers couldn't resist. (Stockey, G & Grocott, and C 2012) pg. 37–42. These two sources of income were the pillar of the port of Gibraltar trading and contraband. As the time passed regulations became stricter this helped in the reduction of contraband in the Port of Gibraltar. A new century brought international companies with the assents necessary to help modernise the port of Gibraltar creating one of the most modern ports in the world.

== Modern Port of Gibraltar ==
Today, the Port of Gibraltar continues to benefit from its strategic location which has made it a "maritime gateway" between the Atlantic and the Mediterranean. With its location at the crossroads of global trade, the port has become the largest bunkering port in the Mediterranean and a prominent maritime staging post, open to vessels of all types and sizes. Nearly 240 million gross tons of shipping call at the port every year, with 60,000 vessels transiting the Strait of Gibraltar. The port also benefits from its close proximity to Gibraltar International Airport which enables crew changes and the supply of provisions and spare parts.

In 2005, the Gibraltar Port Authority was established with the aim of improving the safety and services at the port.

The port features a shipyard capable of emergency dry docking and major repairs, named Gibdock. It is frequently used by the Royal Navy for training purposes or as a stopover for ships transiting to Africa and the Middle East. The Royal Navy bases the Gibraltar Squadron at the port, which is tasked with guarding Gibraltar's territorial waters. These boats regularly deploy from the port to address Spanish incursions, which are made against the backdrop of a sovereignty dispute between the UK and Spain on the Status of Gibraltar.

Prior to 2024, marine services at the Port of Gibraltar, including for naval vessels using the port, had been provided by Resolve Marine, Gibraltar. Resolve Marine was equipped with one ASD ocean-going and harbour tug (Resolve Hercules), four harbour tugs (Rooke, Wellington, Egerton and Eliott), two barges (Isaac 1874 and RMG 280) as well as the anchor-handling tug Resolve Blizzard, which can provide regional firefighting, oil pollution and emergency response services. In February 2024, Resolve Salvage and Fire, along with many of these assets, was acquired by Boluda Towage Europe. In June 2024, Boluda strengthened its presence at Gibraltar by adding the tugboat "VB Responder" to its fleet.

The port has become a popular tourist destination and is a frequent calling point for cruise ships. In 2006, 65 cruise ships made 202 calls at the port, bringing 210,800 passengers. The port features a cruise terminal, complete with a tourist information office, a cafeteria and convenience shops, as well as a 940-metre-long (0.94 km) quay which can accommodate four medium-sized or two large-sized vessels simultaneously.

In 2017, the CEO and Captain of the Gibraltar Port Authority, Commodore Bob Sanguinetti, warned Brexit could cause the port severe implications. According to Sanguinetti, Brexit risked undermining the low-cost, VAT-free fuel which the port previously attained by being part of the EU but not within its VAT jurisdiction, as well as adding border restrictions which could impede the movement of parts, provisions and people, including from Algeciras in Spain, which stores 30% of the port's bunker fuel.
