= Economy of Gibraltar =

- Currency: Pound Sterling
- Fiscal year: 1 July – 30 June
- Trade organisations: EU, OECD and WTO

Statistics
- GDP: ▲£2.344 billion (2018)
- GDP growth: ▲5.9% (2018)
- GDP per capita: ▲$111,875.67(2023/2024 Forecast)
- GDP by sector: agriculture 0%, industry 0%, services 100% (2008 est.)
- Inflation (CPI): 2.6% (2006)
- Population below national poverty line: n/av
- Gini coefficient: n/av
- Labour force: 12,690 (including non-Gibraltar laborers) (2001)
- Labour force by occupation: agriculture – negligible, industry 40%, services 60% (2001)
- Unemployment: 3% (2005 est.)
- Main industries: tourism, banking and finance, ship repairing, tobacco, gambling

External
- Exports: $271 million (2004 est.)
- Export goods: (principally reexports) petroleum 51%, manufactured goods 41%, other 8%
- Main export partners: n/av
- Imports: $2.967 billion (2004 est.)
- Import goods: fuels, manufactured goods, foodstuffs
- Main import partners: n/av
- Gross external debt: n/av

Public finance
- Government debt: ▼7.5% of GDP (2008 est.)
- Revenue: $475.8 million (2008 est.)
- Spending: $452.3 million (2008 est.)
- All values, unless otherwise stated, are in US dollars.

The economy of Gibraltar consists largely of the services sector. While part of the European Union until Brexit, the British overseas territory of Gibraltar has a separate legal jurisdiction from the United Kingdom and a different tax system. The role of the UK Ministry of Defence, which at one time was Gibraltar's main source of income, has decreased, with today's economy mainly based on shipping, tourism, financial services, and the Internet (mostly gambling).

As of 2020, Brexit represents a major uncertainty for the Gibraltar economy.

== History of manufacturing in Gibraltar ==
=== Pre-1900 History ===
- 1704 – The HM Dockyard in Gibraltar is established after the Capture of Gibraltar. The initial facilities include a quay, careening wharf, and multiple workshops.
- 1720 - South Mole is built during the 1720s. It is a small dockyard with a careening wharf, mast house, and multiple workshops as well.
- 1810 – Marcus Henry Bland arrives in Gibraltar and founds Bland Group as a shipping agency.
- 1840 – Coaling facilities are introduced to Gibraltar.
- 1891 – The Gaggero family take over operations of the Bland Group, as Joseph Gaggero buys the company.
- 1895 – Captain Augustus Phillimore's plan for a new naval dockyard is approved by Parliament.

=== 20th-century history ===
- 1902 – An air lock diving-bell plant and barge are imported to install heavy moorings in Gibraltar's rocky seabed.
- 1914 – Two Bland Group ships are attacked by German submarines.
- 1931 – Gibraltar Airways is launched.
- 1969 – The Spanish-Gibraltar border closes, and the Bland Group shifts its focus to tourism.
- 1972 – Gibraltar Industries is founded.
- 1984 – The HM Dockyard is sold to A&P Group, later passed to the Government of Gibraltar as Gibraltar Ship Repair.
- 1990 - The HM Dockyard is taken over by Norway's Kværner, then closed in 1996 for 18 months.

=== Modern Day (21st Century) ===
- 2005 - Gibraltar Corporation is founded. It is a manufacturer of springs, wire forms, and metal stampings.
- 2020 – Bassadone Automotive Group supplies ambulances and other project vehicles converted locally from SUV vehicles to the United Nations and other agencies, employing some 320 staff across its range of activities.
- 2022 – The HM Dockyard is acquired by UK-based Balaena Ltd, reviving the military ship repair operation.
- 2022 – KeyBanc Capital Markets closes a syndication of a US$400M Senior Secured Revolving Credit Facility for Gibraltar Industries, Inc.

== Sectors ==
=== Shipping ===
Shipping in Gibraltar is important because of Gibraltar's strategic position on one side of the entrance to the Mediterranean Sea. The Strait of Gibraltar is a globally important shipping lane. Gibraltar has become a place known for its expertise with shipping and it has annually 7,000 ship calls.

Bunkering

Gibraltar is one of the largest bunkering ports in the Mediterranean Sea, with 4.3 million tonnes of bunkers delivered in 2021 to over 5,500 ships. This has become the main activity within the Port of Gibraltar. Increased competition from Algeciras in 2022 resulted in a fall to around 3.4m tonnes.

=== Finance ===
Until Brexit Gibraltar was a constituent part of the European Union as a Special Member State territory, having joined the European Economic Community with the United Kingdom in 1973, under the provisions of the Treaty of Rome relating to European dependent territories. However, it is exempt from the Common external tariff, the Common Agricultural Policy and the requirement to levy Value added tax.

Financial institutions operating in Gibraltar are regulated by the Gibraltar Financial Services Commission. Gibraltar has had a stock exchange since 2014, the Gibraltar Stock Exchange.

Subject to notifying the EU Commissioner, who must be satisfied that they meet certain criteria in accordance with the relevant EU Directive, Gibraltar-licensed or -authorised financial institutions can provide services throughout the EU and European Economic Area without having to seek separate licences or authorisation in the host Member State. This is known as the passporting of financial services.

In December 2008 in a landmark decision the European Court of Justice ruled that:

the Court finds that the competent Gibraltar authorities which have devised the tax reform have, from a constitutional point of view, a political and administrative status separate from that of the central government of the United Kingdom.

This allowed the implementation of a new low tax system which took full effect in 2010.

Referred to as an International Finance Centre, Gibraltar was among 35 jurisdictions identified by the Organisation for Economic Co-operation and Development (OECD) as a tax haven in June 2000. However, the list's disclaimer states:

That list should be seen in its historical context and as an evaluation by OECD member countries at a particular point in time of which countries met the criteria set out in the 1998 Report, Harmful Tax Competition: An Emerging Global Issue. More than five years have passed since the publication of the OECD list contained in the 2000 Report and positive changes have occurred in individual countries' transparency and exchange of information laws and practices since that time. The list has not been updated to reflect such changes.

As a result of having made a commitment in accordance with the OECD's 2001 Progress Report on the OECD's Project on Harmful Tax Practices, Gibraltar is not included in the OECD's list of uncooperative tax havens. It has also never been listed on the FATF Blacklist of uncooperative countries in the fight against money laundering. It may also be referred to as an offshore financial centre, by international institutions such as the International Monetary Fund (IMF).

However, in its April 2009 progress report, the OECD listed Gibraltar in the list of jurisdictions which, although committed, had not "substantially implemented" yet the internationally agreed tax standard. Following Gibraltar's signing of 12 additional Tax Information Exchange Agreements (TIEAs), as of October 2009, with jurisdictions including the UK, US and Germany, to sum 13, Gibraltar is currently listed in the OECD "white list", and is considered a jurisdiction that has substantially implemented the tax standard. It therefore shares the same status as OECD member states such as the UK, the US, Spain or Germany.

Fiscal advantages, including no tax on capital income, are offered to a maximum of 8,464 offshore qualified companies incorporated in Gibraltar. After an agreement with the European Union in 2005, this tax exempt regime is due to disappear on 31 December 2010.

A 2007 IMF report on the regulatory environment and anti–money laundering has once again endorsed Gibraltar's robust regulatory environment.

According to the report:

Gibraltar has a well-regulated financial sector. The Gibraltar authorities are concerned with protecting the reputation and integrity of Gibraltar as a financial center, and are cognizant of the importance of adopting and applying international regulatory standards and best supervisory practices. Gibraltar has a good reputation internationally for cooperation and information sharing.

In 2008 Gibraltar was listed for the first time in the Global Financial Centres Index published by the City of London Corporation. The Rock was ranked 26th in a list of 69 leading finance centres around the world based on an online survey of 1,236 business professionals, who provided a total of 18,878 assessments. In the most recent GFCI report of 2011, Gibraltar was ranked 63rd in the world, and 8th of the leading offshore financial centres (OFCs).

The Tax Justice Network ranked Gibraltar at No. 43 out of 71 jurisdictions on its 2011 Financial Secrecy Index. Gibraltar's "secrecy score" was 78, equating to Switzerland in that category.

Gibraltar was also ranked in the top 20 centres for e-readiness, coming 20th after major capitals and leading offshore centres.

=== Tourism ===
Tourism in the British territory often provides as a large economic factor for the city. The territory gets about 10.5 million tourists annually, of which, about 80% of all people who arrive on Gibraltarian soil come from the nation of Spain. According to statistics recorded in 2024, tourism ramps up more so in the latter half of the year, peaking at around October.

Tourist spots in the territory often compose of geographical features on the Rock of Gibraltar, including Apes' Den, St. Michael's Cave, along with many others outside of the rock like the city center.

=== Internet business ===
Gibraltar offers a favourable tax system, good internet connectivity along with a well-developed regulatory system. All gambling operations in Gibraltar require licensing under the Gambling Act 2005. The Gibraltar Regulatory Authority is the Gambling Commissioner under the Gambling Act 2005, and therefore the regulatory body. The UK has published plans to protect online gamblers from crime and exploitation by banning gambling adverts from poorly regulated countries which specifically mention Gibraltar as an approved location.

== Defence spending ==
The UK's Ministry of Defence was originally the mainstay of Gibraltar's economy but this has greatly reduced to around 6% of the gross domestic product. In 2006 the Ministry of Defence announced that the provision of services to the military base would be contracted to make further cost savings. This was finalised in January 2007.

== Taxation ==
In 2019, the International Agreement on Taxation and Protection of Financial Interests between Spain and the United Kingdom on Gibraltar was signed by all three countries. This agreement covers such issues as tax co-operation between the authorities in Gibraltar and Spain, the criteria for tax residence of individuals and companies and procedures for administrative cooperation.

== Interaction with the nearby area ==
In September 2009 the Gibraltar Chamber of Commerce released an Economic impact study and analysis of the economies of Gibraltar and the Campo de Gibraltar produced by Professor John Fletcher of Bournemouth University. The report aimed at clarifying the effects of Gibraltar's economy on the Campo area. It demonstrated that Gibraltar's economy has a significant and very positive economic impact on the Campo de Gibraltar. It also noted that the Campo region played a "significant role [..] in Gibraltar's economic development as well", concluding that "[b]oth economies and societies would be the poorer without the other..."

Its conclusions were:

- The Gibraltar economy has a significant and positive economic impact on the Campo de Gibraltar region when considered from the point of view of net recurrent expenditure.
- In 2007 Gibraltar businesses imported more than £174m of goods and services from Spain (excluding petroleum imports).
- Spanish frontier workers earned almost 243m in 2007 and this money was repatriated and spent in the Campo de Gibraltar region to generate further rounds of economic activity.
- Other frontier workers (excluding Spanish and Gibraltarian) earned £82.8m from within the economy of Gibraltar.
- The number of jobs supported by the Gibraltar economy (within Gibraltar) is equivalent to 18% of the total 102,468 jobs recorded in the Campo de Gibraltar region in 2007.
- Residents of Gibraltar spent almost £30m on shopping, food and other goods and services, in Spain, during 2007.
- Gibraltarians with second homes in the Campo de Gibraltar spent more than £33.5m in the Spanish economy during 2007.
- Gibraltar's economy increased the level of output in the Campo de Gibraltar in 2007 by £301.745m. Total visitor spending in Gibraltar in 2007 was £230.6m of which £176m was by visitors across the land frontier. Of this £176m land frontier visitor expenditure, some £112.4m was attributable to Campo de Gibraltar residents and a further £21.27m is assumed to be displacement from the Spanish economy, leaving a total net direct output effect of £168m from recurrent spending (£302m-£134m).
- In 2007 the £302m direct output effect of the Gibraltar economy on the Campo de Gibraltar economy was responsible for a direct increase in gross domestic product (GDP) within the Campo de Gibraltar region of £195m.
- Using the Andalusia Regional Input-Output model to estimate the secondary effects of the two economies' interaction, the Gibraltar economy was responsible for a further increase in GDP in the Campo de Gibraltar region of £125m, resulting in a total increase in GDP of just over £420m.
- The Gibraltar economy was responsible for approximately 12.2% of the total GDP in the Campo de Gibraltar in 2007.
- In terms of a further wealth effect created by the Gibraltar economy, the evidence would seem to suggest that property values within the Campo de Gibraltar region have increased by up to 40% because of the proximity to Gibraltar. With just over 86,000 households in the region and using a conservative property value (at 2007 prices) this could account for an increase in Campo de Gibraltar asset values of somewhere between £1.4 to £5.4 billion. The reason for such large variation is explained partly through the lack of data that are available without undertaking a detailed survey and partly because of the volatility experienced by the Spanish housing market over the past year, where property prices, particularly in some areas, have fallen dramatically. In part this fall in property prices is explained by the general economic downturn being experienced by the global economy and in part by the effect of the falling pound sterling with respect to the value of the euro which will have put further downward pressure on property prices in the region.
- Gibraltar also imported approximately 1.5m tonnes of petroleum products from the Campo de Gibraltar region for bunkering during 2007 and the value of this has not been included in the analyses. If the value of this fuel is included as an import from the Campo de Gibraltar it adds almost another £300m to the impact of Gibraltar on the region, [using Meyrick and Associates of fuel bunker prices for this period and a GBP to USD exchange rate of 0.5049 being the mid-point in 2007].

== Economy in detail ==
Exports of Gibraltar by product category (2019) Chemical products Transportation Machines Mineral products Plastics and rubbers Metals Foodstuffs Precious metals Textiles Instruments Animal products Vegetable products Paper goods Footwear and headwear Miscellaneous Stone and glass Wood products Animal and vegetable bi-products Animal hides Arts and antiques Weapons

Leading economic sectors in Gibraltar include shipping, tourism, and virtual gaming. Gibraltar also developed a reputation as a well regulated international finance center.

Self-sufficient Gibraltar benefits from an extensive shipping trade, offshore banking, and its position as an international conference center. The British military presence has been sharply reduced and now contributes about 7% to the local economy, compared with 60% in 1984. The financial sector, tourism (almost 5 million visitors in 1998), shipping services fees, and duties on consumer goods also generate revenue. The financial sector, the shipping sector, and tourism each contribute 25%–30% of GDP. Telecommunications accounts for another 10%. In recent years, Gibraltar has seen major structural change from a public to a private sector economy, but changes in government spending still have a major impact on the level of employment.

Figures from the CIA World Factbook show the main export markets in 2006 were United Kingdom 30.8%, Spain 22.7%, Germany 13.7%, Turkmenistan 10.4%, Switzerland 8.3%, Italy 6.7% while the corresponding figures for imports are Spain 23.4%, Russia 12.3%, Italy 12%, UK 9%, France 8.9%, Netherlands 6.8% and United States 4.7%.

The Gibraltar Government state that economy grew in 2004/2005 by 7% to a GDP of £599,180,000. Based on statistics in the 2006 surveys, the Government statisticians estimate it has grown by 8.5% in 2005/6 and by 10.8% in 2006/7 and that the GDP is probably now around 730 million. Inflation was running at 2.6% in 2006 and predicted to be 2% to 3% in 2007. Speaking at the 2007 budget session, Peter Caruana, the Chief Minister said "The scale of Gibraltar's economic success makes it one of the most affluent communities in the entire world."

Labour force: 12,690 (including non-Gibraltar labourers) (2001)

Labour force – by occupation: services 60%, industry 40%, agriculture NEGL% Unemployment rate 2% (2001)

Budget revenues: $455.1 million expenditures: $423.6 million (2005 est.)

Public debt 15.7% of GDP (2005 est.)

Industries tourism, banking and finance, ship repairing, tobacco

Industrial production growth rate NA%

Electricity – production 142 million kWh (2006 est.)

Electricity – production by source

fossil fuel 100%

hydro 0%

nuclear 0%

other 0%

Electricity – consumption 142 million kWh (2006 est.)

Electricity – exports 0 kWh (1998)

Electricity – imports 0 kWh (1998)

Oil – production 0 barrels per day (0 m^{3}/d) (2001 est.)

Oil – consumption 42,000 barrels per day (6,700 m^{3}/d) 2001

Oil – exports NA (2001)

Oil – imports NA (2001)

Agriculture – products none

Exports $271 million (2004 est.)

Exports – commodities (principally reexports) petroleum 51%, manufactured goods 41%, other 8%

Exports – partners UK, Morocco, Portugal, Netherlands, Spain, US, Germany

Imports $2.967 billion (2004 est.)

Imports – commodities Fuels, manufactured goods, and foodstuffs

Imports – partners UK, Spain, Japan, Netherlands

Fiscal year 1 July – 30 June

The above figures taken from the CIA World Factbook September 2009 edition.

== Various economic indicators by national origin ==
The average annual earnings of Indo-Gibraltarians is nearly twice that of the rest of Gibraltarian people and approximately 1.5 times that of immigrants in the UK, thus making people of Indian descent by far the most economically affluent ethnic group in Gibraltar.

Rank	National Origin	Average annual earnings
1	Indian	£32,585
2	UK British	£22,011
3	Other EU	£20,613
4	All other nationals	£20,414
5	National average	£19,383
6	Gibraltarian	£18,934
7	Spanish	£13,359
8	Moroccan	£12,933

Rank	Origin	Hourly pay
1	Indian	£14.73
2	UK British	£11.30
3	Other EU	£10.58
4	All other nationals	£10.48
5	National average	£10.03
6	Gibraltarian	£9.46
7	Spanish	£6.86
8	Moroccan	£6.64

Rank	Origin	Unemployment rate
1	Moroccan	7.3%
2	Spanish	2.8%
3	National average	2%
4	Gibraltarian	2%
5	UK British	1.4%
6	Other EU	1.4%
7	All other nationals	0.7%
8	Indian	0.4%

Rank	Origin	Average monthly earnings
1	Indian	£2,455.61
2	UK British	£1,818.57
3	Other EU	£1,715.89
4	All other nationals	£1,628.83
5	National average	£1,627.49
6	Gibraltarian	£1,625.49
7	Spanish	£1,171.22
8	Moroccan	£1,148.04

Rank	Origin	% in higher managerial and professional occupations
1	Indian	20.3%
2	UK British	12.6%
3	Other EU	11.8%
4	All other nationals	9.5%
5	National average	9.0%
6	Gibraltarian	8.4%
7	Spanish	5.9%
8	Moroccan	4.4%
