= Forge Wood =

Neighbourhood in Crawley, West Sussex, England

Coordinates: 51.1368°N 0.1529°W

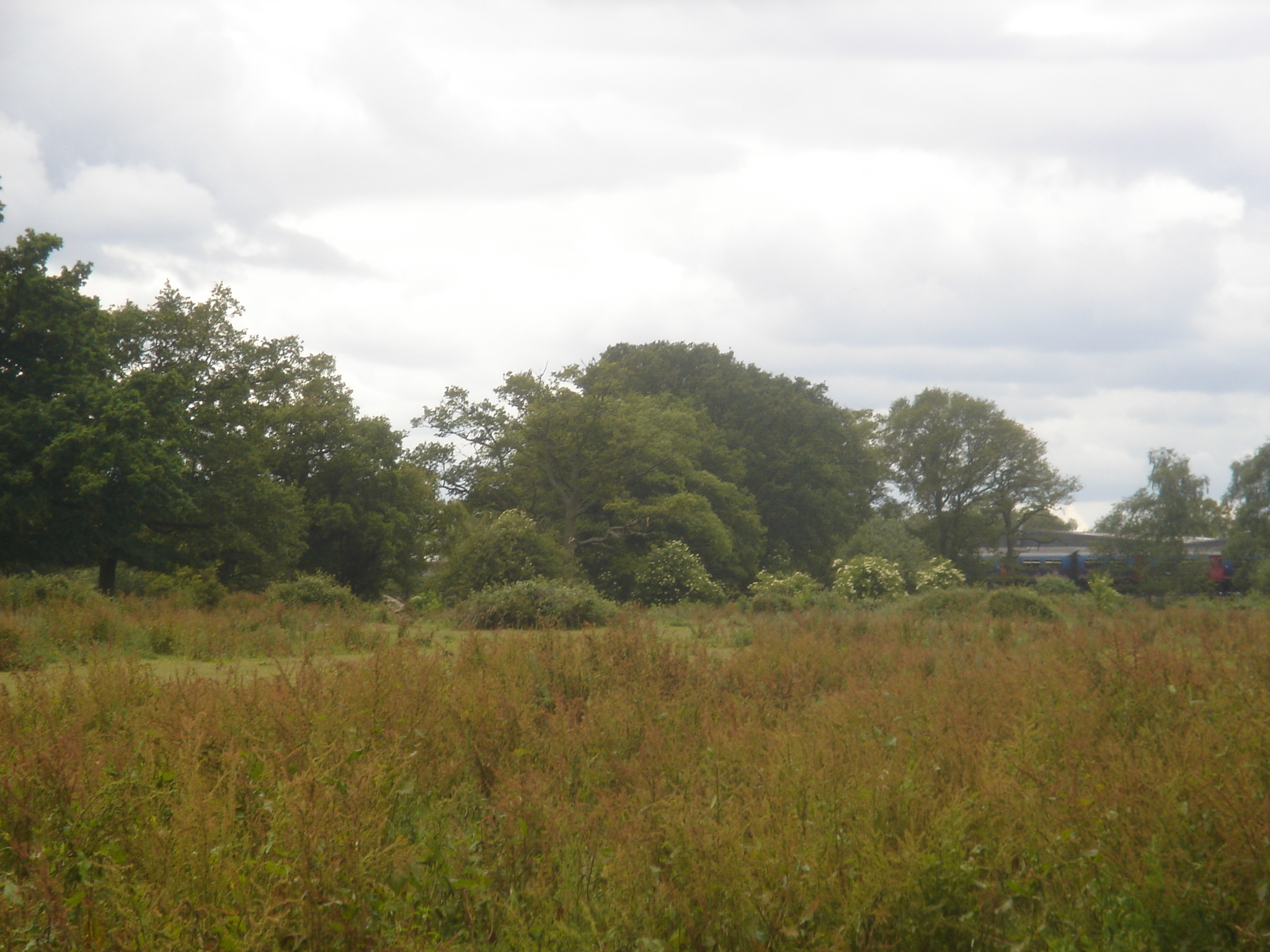
Rough pastureland south of Radford Road in Tinsley Green, photographed in 2009. This land is on the boundary of the application site.

Forge Wood (under construction and semi-occupied, but scheduled for completion in 2026) is the 14th residential neighbourhood in Crawley, a town and borough in West Sussex. The 1,900 houses and other facilities will be built on open land in the northeast of the borough, adjoining the ancient village of Tinsley Green and to the north of the Pound Hill neighbourhood.

Forge Wood was known as the North East Sector until December 2013, when the present name was adopted in reference to an area of ancient woodland within its boundaries. The site has a long and complex planning history dating back to 1998. Crawley Borough Council, which owned much of the poor-quality pastureland which characterises the area, favoured developing it for housing; but opponents of the plans raised concerns over flooding, noise pollution and the proximity of the proposed second runway should expansion of Gatwick Airport go ahead. The airport lies a short distance to the north of the site, and a motorway and a main railway line are also adjacent. After many alterations, resubmissions and a legal challenge, outline planning permission for 1,900 houses was granted in February 2011, and construction began in 2014.

== Location ==
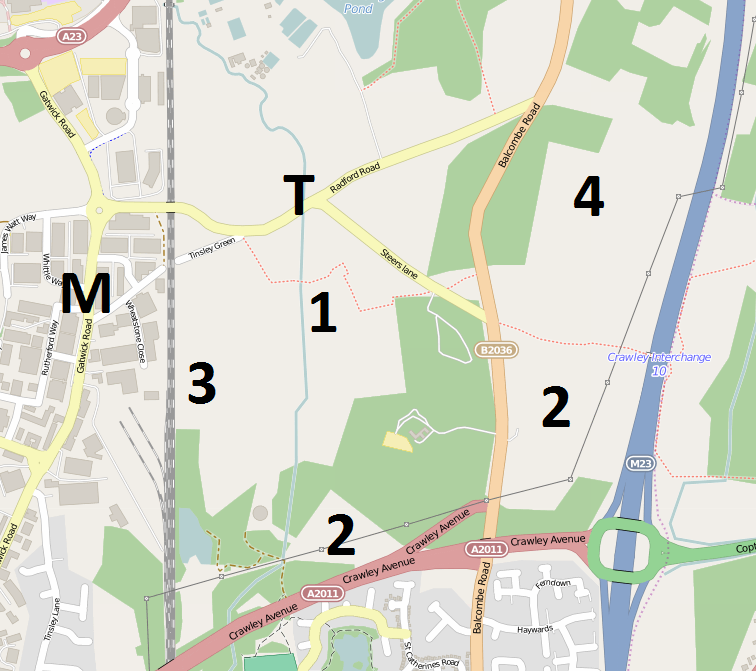
OpenStreetMap of the development site. Phases of development are numbered; M = Manor Royal Industrial Estate; T = Tinsley Green.

As indicated by its provisional name of North East Sector, the Forge Wood neighbourhood will occupy land in the northeast corner of Crawley borough. The roughly rectangular site is bordered by the Brighton Main Line to the west, the A2011 Crawley Avenue dual carriageway to the south, the M23 motorway to the east and the hamlet of Tinsley Green to the north. Balcombe Road, part of the B2028 road, cuts through the designated area from south to north. Some public rights of way run through the site. The first phase of development, on which work began in 2013, lies west of Balcombe Road around Steers Lane. Crawley town centre is about 3 miles (4.8 km) away.

The neighbourhood was named after an area of ancient woodland within the development area, close to Steers Lane. The Surrey and Sussex Crematorium is in the middle of this woodland. Unrelated to the new development, Forgewood [sic] is also the name of a small group of industrial units within the nearby Manor Royal industrial estate. It lies at the south end of Gatwick Road, on the opposite side of the railway line from the Forge Wood neighbourhood, and consists of 13 units of around 3,000–5,000 square feet (280–460 m^{2}) each.

Development of the site will bring the eastern boundary of Crawley's built-up area closer to Copthorne, a nearby village east of the M23. In August 2014, outline planning permission was granted for a development of 500 houses on the west side of Copthorne which would in turn expand the village as far as the M23, "effectively merging" the two settlements. The application was approved after the developer, St. Modwen Properties, amended it to include more footpaths and cycle paths connecting the estate with Forge Wood.

Parts of the development site will potentially be affected by noise from the Brighton Main Line and Manor Royal industrial estate to the west, the airport to the north and the motorway to the east. The developers will use "various attenuation techniques" such as landscaping and soundproof building techniques to overcome this. Likewise, there is a flood risk associated with the Gatwick Stream (a tributary of the River Mole); buildings will be sited away from the floodplain, sustainable drainage system techniques will be used, and excess water will be stored. The ancient woodland within the site provides habitats for protected species, and the maintenance of these habitats or the creation of replacements is a condition of the development.

When Crawley was designated as a New Town in 1947, the present Forge Wood area was in the northeasternmost part of Worth parish within the Cuckfield Rural District of East Sussex. In 1953, it formed part of the 3,347 acres (1,354 ha) of land transferred to West Sussex and the parish of Crawley. Accordingly it became part of Crawley Urban District in 1956 and the borough of Crawley in 1974 when these entities were created. The area east of Balcombe Road was not part of the designated area of the New Town, and was only transferred from Worth parish (by now part of Mid Sussex district) to the borough of Crawley in 1983. The county boundary between West Sussex and Surrey ran along the north side of Radford Road until 1974, when it moved northwards to take in Gatwick Airport and the surrounding land which had been in Surrey.

== Development ==
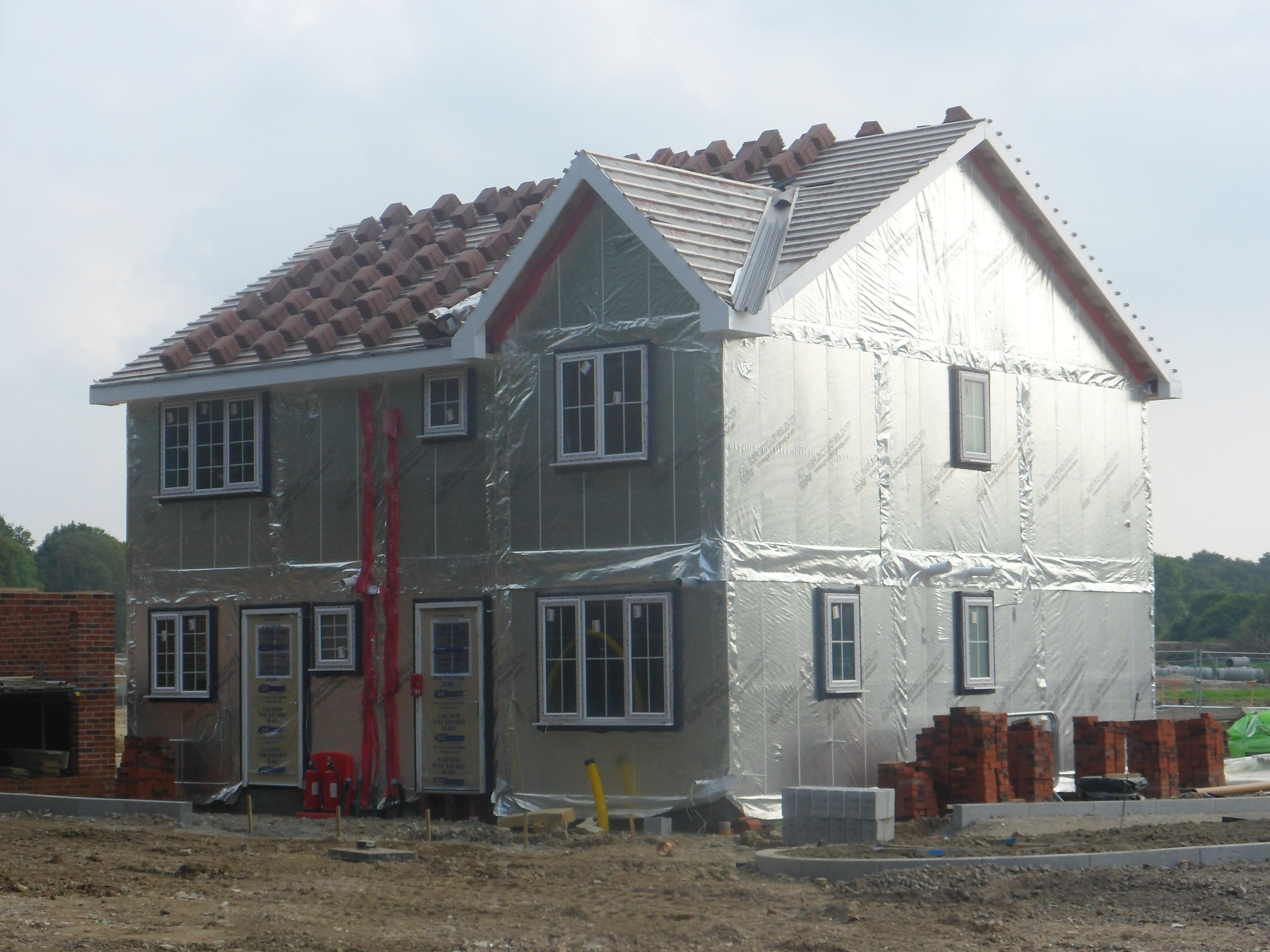
The first house (pictured in September 2014 while under construction) faces Steers Lane.

Crawley was built as a postwar new town in accordance with the New Towns Act 1946. Anthony Minoprio's master plan designated nine "neighbourhoods"—self-contained residential areas with mixed styles and tenure of housing, extensive open space and a central area with facilities such as a shopping parade, church, community centre and school. Crawley Development Corporation was responsible for developing these. After it was wound up another four neighbourhoods with a mix of private and council housing were added, most recently Maidenbower in the late 1980s. Forge Wood is therefore described as "Crawley's 14th neighbourhood". The development is being undertaken by a consortium consisting of Crawley Borough Council, housebuilders Taylor Wimpey and Persimmon Homes, and the Homes and Communities Agency—a non-departmental government body responsible for affordable housing.

Of the 1,900 houses, 60% (1,140) will be for private ownership and 40% (760) will be classed as affordable housing: 532 council houses for rent and 228 shared ownership houses. The latter allow people to buy a majority share in a house at 20% less than its market value. All four phases of development will incorporate some council and affordable housing. The Borough's council housing stock, which will be developed by the council itself, will increase from about 8,100 houses to more than 8,600 by the time work finishes.

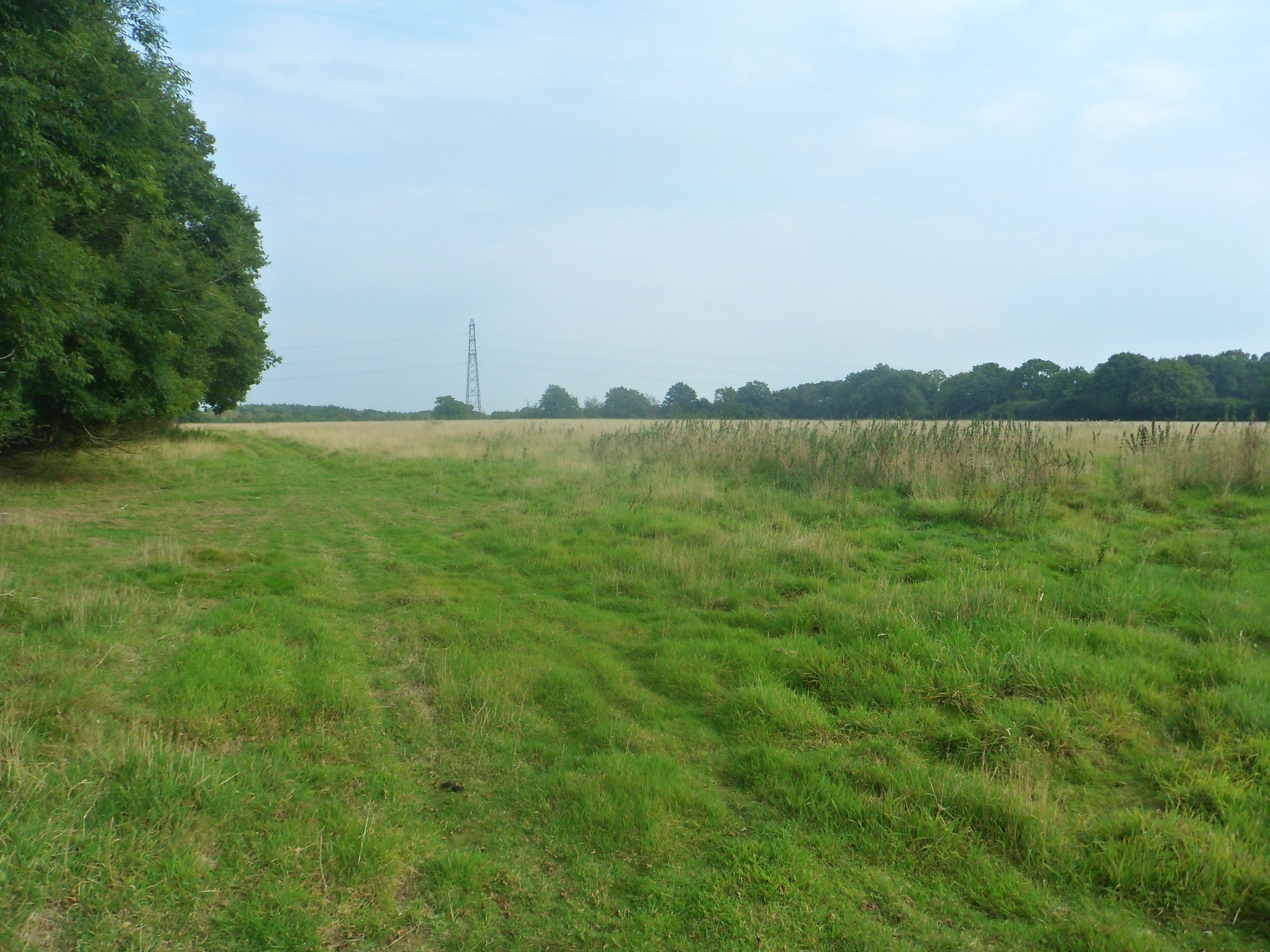
"Phase 2" of the development will occupy fields east of the Balcombe Road and south of the footpath to Copthorne (behind the treeline on the left).

The 1,900 houses will have 2, 3, 4 or 5 bedrooms. They will contribute towards the total of 4,895 which have been committed to in the draft Crawley Local Plan, which covers the proposed development of Crawley until 2030. This document was submitted for government approval in 2014. Public consultation exercises were held in the Bewbush and Broadfield neighbourhoods and at Crawley Library in September and October 2014 to discuss issues relating to the Local Plan, including the proposals for Forge Wood.

Forge Wood will be built in four phases. The first phase will include most of the non-residential buildings, consisting of a community centre, shopping area, health centre and a 2,230-square-metre (24,000 sq ft) school building. Playing fields, a hard-surface games court and an area of parkland alongside the Gatwick Stream will also be created. Two new road links will be created: one leading on to Steers Lane to the north at Tinsley Green, and one on to the A2011 Crawley Avenue. The "Phase 1" sector lies in the centre–west of the development area, wholly to the west of Balcombe Road. Phase 2 will occupy the southeastern part of the development area, east of Balcombe Road and south of a footpath which crosses the M23 motorway; a small area south of the Phase 1 development will also be added at this time. Phase 3 will form the westernmost part of the neighbourhood, between the already developed area and the railway line; and Phase 4 covers the northeastern part of the development area immediately north of the "Phase 2" sector. Two blocks of land totalling 5.18 hectares (12.8 acres) have been reserved for "possible future extension" at the north ends of the Phase 3 and Phase 4 areas. Other areas of undeveloped land not owned by the council totalling 11.99 hectares (29.6 acres) have also been identified.

Open space will make up more than two-thirds of the neighbourhood by area. As well as parks, meadows and play areas, areas of undeveloped ancient woodland will be retained. The main areas are Blackcorner Wood, adjacent to Balcombe Road within the Phase 4 sector; St Crispin's Wood and Forge Wood (after which the neighbourhood is named), which lie west of Balcombe Road and will separate the Phase 1 and 2 areas; and The Larches and The Birches in the southwest corner. The Surrey and Sussex Crematorium lies within Forge Wood and there is a gasholder inside The Larches. Footpaths will be laid out within St Crispin's Wood and Forge Wood to give pedestrian access between different parts of the neighbourhood.

West Sussex County Council will be responsible for setting up the neighbourhood's school, which will cater for pupils between 4 and 11 years old. Several bodies expressed an interest in sponsoring and running the school, including the town's Hazelwick School and the Diocese of Chichester, and Glyn Learning Foundation Schools (GLF) were chosen. They adopted the name Forge Wood Primary School. The school will accommodate 420 pupils but may be expanded to 630 in the future. It is being built as part of the first phase of development: it is expected to open in September 2016, and applications for places will be accepted from September 2015. There are several other schools around 2–3 miles (3.2–4.8 km) away, and the nearest secondary and tertiary education institutions are respectively 2.5 miles (4.0 km) away (Hazelwick School) and 3.2 miles (5.1 km) away (the Crawley campus of Central Sussex College).

== Planning history ==
The first formal proposal to develop the council-owned open land around the Balcombe Road north of Pound Hill came in 1998, when George Wimpey (predecessors of Taylor Wimpey) and Persimmon Homes jointly submitted a planning application for a new residential neighbourhood. It was lodged on 21 January 1998 with the following description: "Erection of up to 1,900 dwellings, 5,000 square metres (54,000 sq ft) of Use Class B1, B2 and B8 employment floorspace, 2,500 square metres (27,000 sq ft) of retail floorspace, a local centre/community centre (including a community hall), a new primary school, recreational open aspace, landscaping, the relocation of the 132kV OHV power line adjacent to the M23, infrastructure and means of access". The Secretary of State for Communities and Local Government blocked this application before the council could take any action. When the companies submitted an appeal to the Planning Inspectorate, Crawley Borough Council it "due to changed circumstances". The Inspectorate then held a public inquiry in October–November 2006; although this upheld the original refusal to grant planning permission, an appeal was made to the High Court of Justice and the original decision was quashed in 2008. The final decision on whether to approve the application on appeal therefore lay with the Secretary of State for Communities and Local Government. Another public inquiry was held in June 2009. The planning inspector's report was issued in October 2009. Responses from interested parties prompted the Secretary of State to ask for an additional report, which was provided in May 2010.

In the same month, the newly elected coalition government issued a policy document, The Coalition: Our Programme for Government, which stated their intention to "...refuse permission for [an] additional runway at Gatwick". A second runway at the airport had been ruled out in 1979 in an agreement which was due to run out in 2019; but airport expansion in southeast England had been on the political agenda since the publication of the 2003 Air Transport White Paper, which among other things required land to be reserved at Gatwick for a potential new runway. The Secretary of State noted that while this "could not come about for some years, it cannot be ruled out as a longer term possibility." Accordingly, he had to take into account the "extent to which North East Sector would prejudice a second runway", balancing this against the need for housing in Crawley and the surrounding area. He concluded that "the appeal scheme would place no physical impediment in the way of a second wide-spaced runway, and the sole concern remains the wider issue of noise on the surrounding residential communities". Following additional analysis by the planning inspector in the addendum produced in May 2010, the Secretary of State concluded that if a new "wide-spaced" runway (Note: See Expansion of Gatwick Airport for discussion on the proposed spacing and alignment of the potential second runway.) was built to the south of the existing runway, aircraft noise levels would be close to the legally acceptable limit in certain parts of the North East Sector site, but that the use of suitable sound insulation in houses and other buildings would provide "acceptable ... environments". Opposition to the development was mostly based on potential noise pollution and the proximity of the North East Sector to the land safeguarded for a second runway. Also, as part of their campaign against the second runway, the Pound Hill North Residents Association have claimed that in the event of a new runway being built, "[m]any new North East Sector houses [could] potentially [be] purchased for buy to let".

In allowing the appeal and granting planning permission, the Secretary of State imposed 68 conditions. Crawley Borough Council stated in May 2013 that the first houses were expected to be built in 2014 if approval was granted, following the approval that month of a planning application in respect of infrastructure developments for Phase 1. By December 2013, it was stated that "the first house [is] expected to be complete within the next 12 months" and that the full development would consist of four phases lasting about 12 years. Approval for the first 204 houses in Phase 1, of which 59 would be classed as affordable, was granted in March 2014. Legal agreements between the council, the Homes and Communities Agency and the developers were then signed in April 2014. At this time the Homes and Communities Agency stated that it was joint owner of the designated land along with the council.

The name Forge Wood was approved by Crawley Borough councillors and announced to the public on 5 December 2013. Another option had been Tinsley Green, the name of the hamlet adjacent to the site, but the committee decided this could be confused with the name of Tinsley Lane, a residential road in the Three Bridges area of Crawley.

== Roads and transport ==
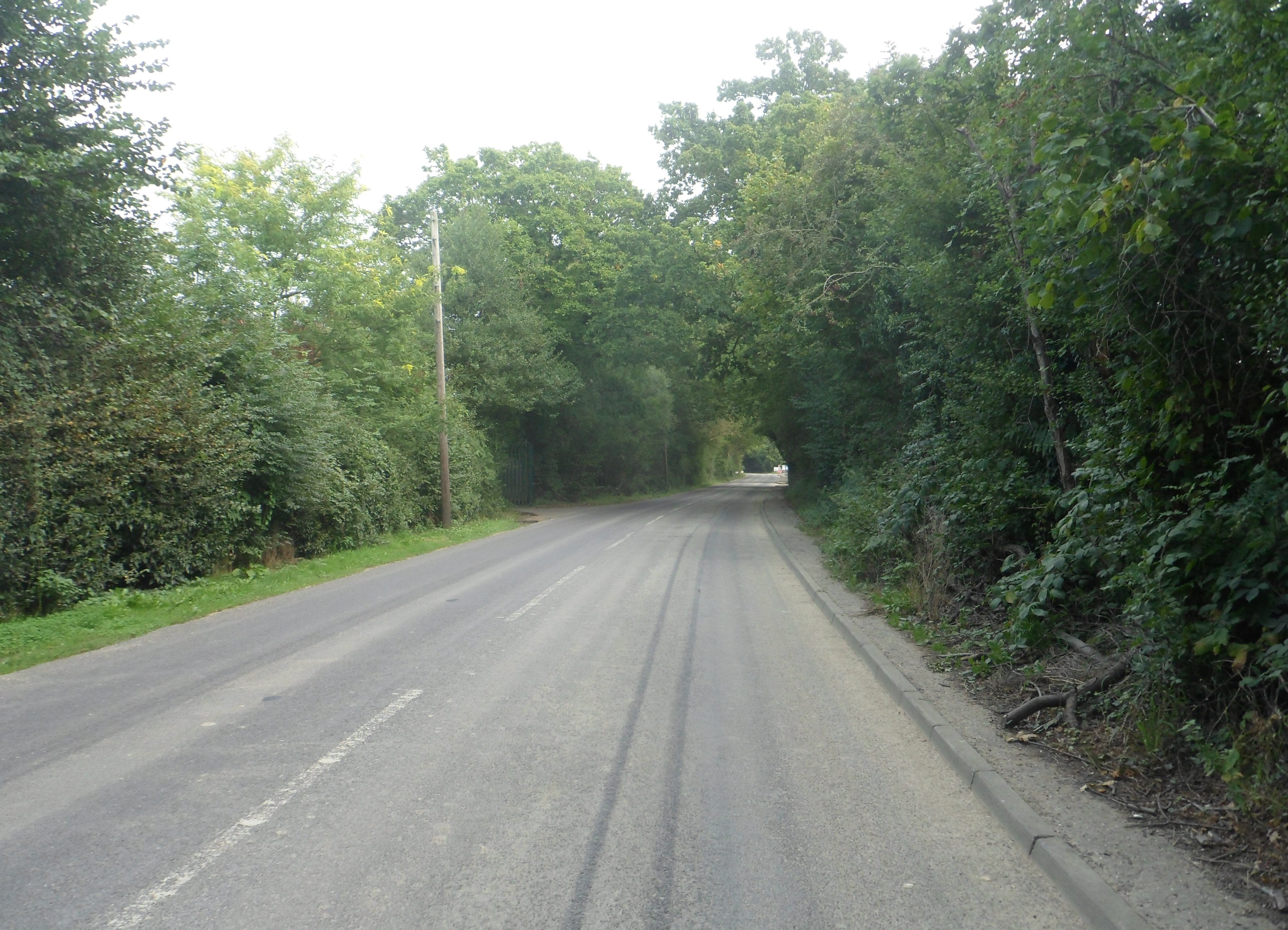
Steers Lane is a single-carriageway road with a 40 miles per hour (64 km/h) speed limit.

Radford Road, Balcombe Road and Steers Lane are all two-way single-carriageway roads with a 40 miles per hour (64 km/h) speed limit. Crawley Avenue is a 60 miles per hour (97 km/h) dual carriageway which forms the main entry to Crawley from the east, including from the motorway network. New roads will connect Steers Lane, Balcombe Road and Crawley Avenue. Persimmon and Taylor Wimpey submitted a planning application for their construction in August 2012, with the intention of starting work on the junctions and the roads themselves as soon as permission was granted. The routes of minor connecting roads would then be decided later. Road improvements to be carried out as part of the development include the installation of new street lighting along the main roads, junction upgrades, the installation of pedestrian crossings and traffic lights in some locations, new cycle routes (in some cases these will be shared footpaths and cycle lanes) and road widening. Also, the present one-way slip roads from Crawley Avenue to Balcombe Road will be replaced with a two-way connecting road. In 2014 one local councillor raised concerns that having just one main road leading through the neighbourhood could result in traffic congestion.

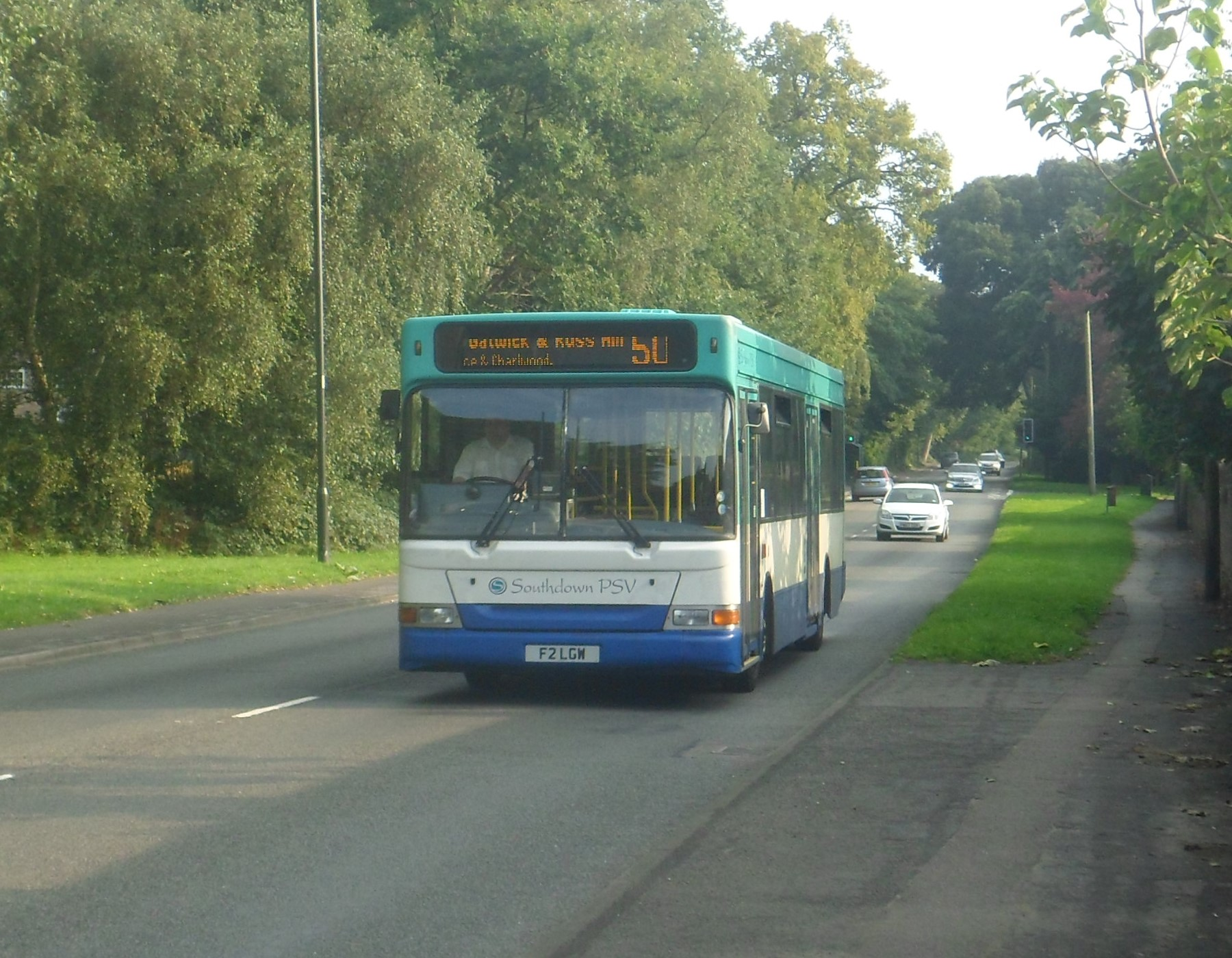
Short-lived Southdown PSV route 50 passed the south end of the Forge Wood site.

Consultants WSP Development and Transportation carried out a transport assessment of the North East Sector in 2006. Among other things, this considered several options for bus services to the new development. In 2006 the only regular route "serving roads adjacent to the site", in the assessment's definition, were the hourly 526/527 circular services which served Crawley and Horley town centres among other places. More frequent routes ran nearby, for example to the top of the Pound Hill neighbourhood (near the south end of the development site) and along Gatwick Road (west of the new neighbourhood). The report concluded that the best way of serving Forge Wood would be to extend the Pound Hill routes (Note: Routes 4 and 5, operated by Metrobus, which together provide a 15-minute frequency and serve destinations such as Three Bridges railway station, Crawley town centre, Langley Green and the County Oak retail park.) to serve the whole of the neighbourhood, and to combine these with shuttle buses to Gatwick Airport via Manor Royal. In September 2014, Southdown PSV introduced hourly routes 40 and 50 to provide a service between several hotels and Gatwick Airport, also serving the north end of Pound Hill and then travelling along Crawley Avenue. This route was withdrawn in 2015. Metrobus introduced route 27 on 23 April 2016, running daily between Forge Wood and Crawley bus station via Three Bridges station. Route 27 will be replaced by new route 3 (branded "Magic Route 3") with effect from 3 February 2018. This will run at a higher frequency—hourly every day—and will be extended from Forge Wood to Gatwick Airport via City Place Gatwick.

Forge Wood's good transport links are being used as a marketing feature. By road, Three Bridges railway station is about 2 miles (3.2 km) away, Gatwick Airport railway station and the airport itself are about 4 miles (6.4 km) distant, and the M23 motorway is close. London's orbital motorway, the M25, is 12 miles (19 km) away via the M23. The road distance to the airport does not reflect its proximity to the site, though. Walking or cycling via Radford Road, City Place Gatwick and National Cycle Route 20, it is about 1.5 miles (2.4 km) from the closest part of the Forge Wood site, (Note: Distances are measured from halfway along Steers Lane to Gatwick Airport railway station.) and the 2006 transport assessment identified the airport as one of several "day-to-day destinations within Crawley [Borough] that can be reached within a 20-minute walk".

== Bibliography ==
- Gooding, D. (June 2006). North East Sector, Crawley Transport Assessment (PDF) (Report). Hertford: WSP Development and Transportation. Archived (PDF) from the original on 4 March 2016.
