= Beehive, Gatwick Airport =

Listed building in West Sussex, England

The Beehive
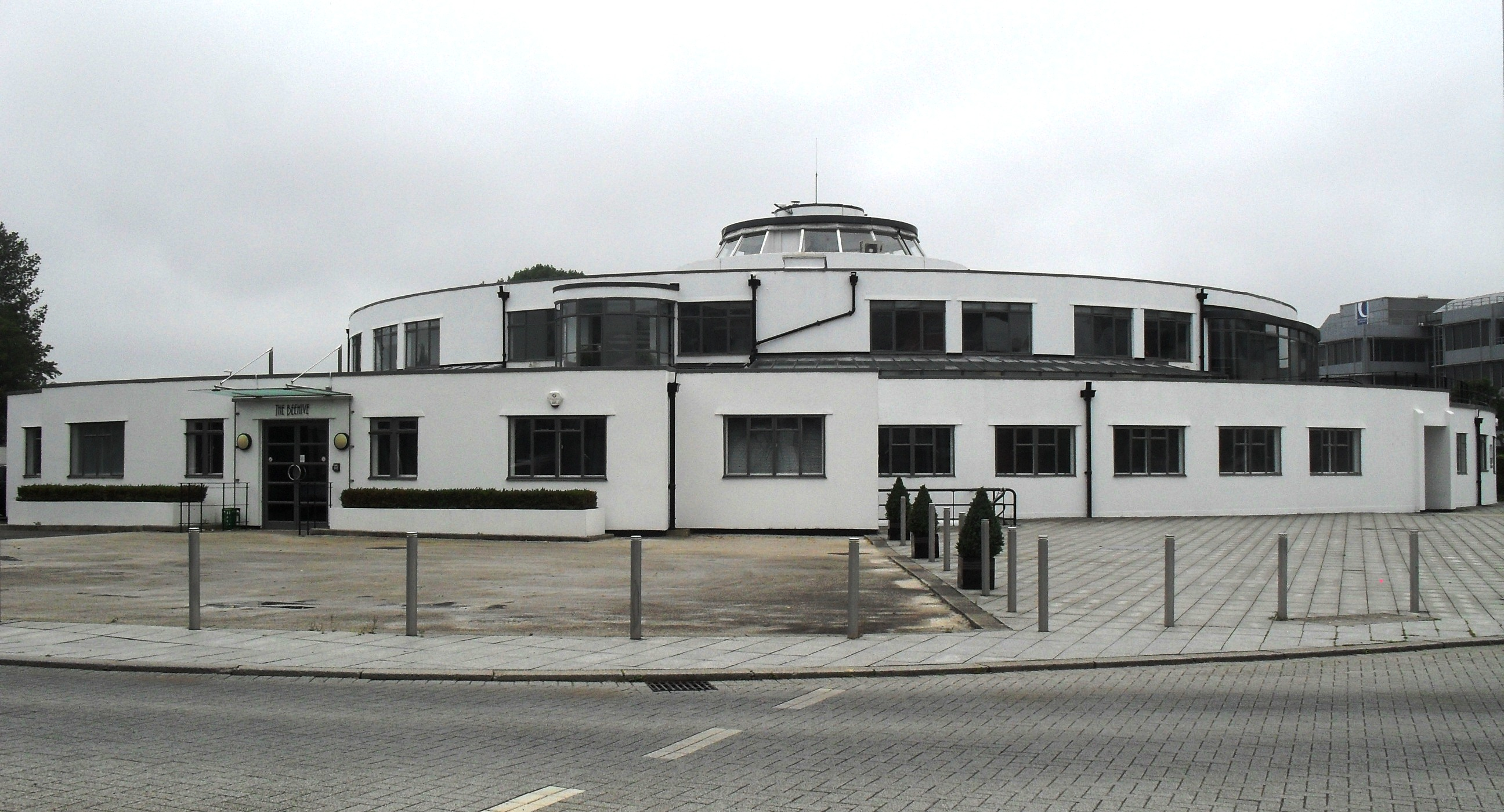
- The Beehive from the east, 2010

- Location within Crawley

General information
- Type: Former airport terminal
- Architectural style: Art Deco
- Location: City Place Gatwick, Crawley, West Sussex, England, Beehive Ring Road, Gatwick Airport, RH6 0PA
- Coordinates: 51°08′39″N 0°09′48″W
- Current tenants: Various
- Construction started: July 1935
- Completed: 1936
- Inaugurated: 6 June 1936
- Owner: Bland Group

Technical details
- Floor count: 3

Design and construction
- Architect: Alan Marlow
- Architecture firm: Hoar, Marlow and Lovett

Listed Building – Grade II*
- Official name: The Beehive (former combined terminal and control tower)
- Designated: 19 August 1996
- Reference no.: 1268327

The Beehive is the original terminal building at Gatwick Airport, England. Opened in 1936, it became obsolete in the 1950s as the airport expanded. In 2008 it was converted into serviced offices, operated by Orega, having served as the headquarters of franchised airline GB Airways for some years before that. It was the world's first fully integrated airport building, and is considered a nationally and internationally important example of airport terminal design. The Beehive is a part of the City Place Gatwick office complex. The 20,000-square-foot (1,900 m^{2}) former terminal building is on a 2-acre (0.81 ha) site.

== History ==
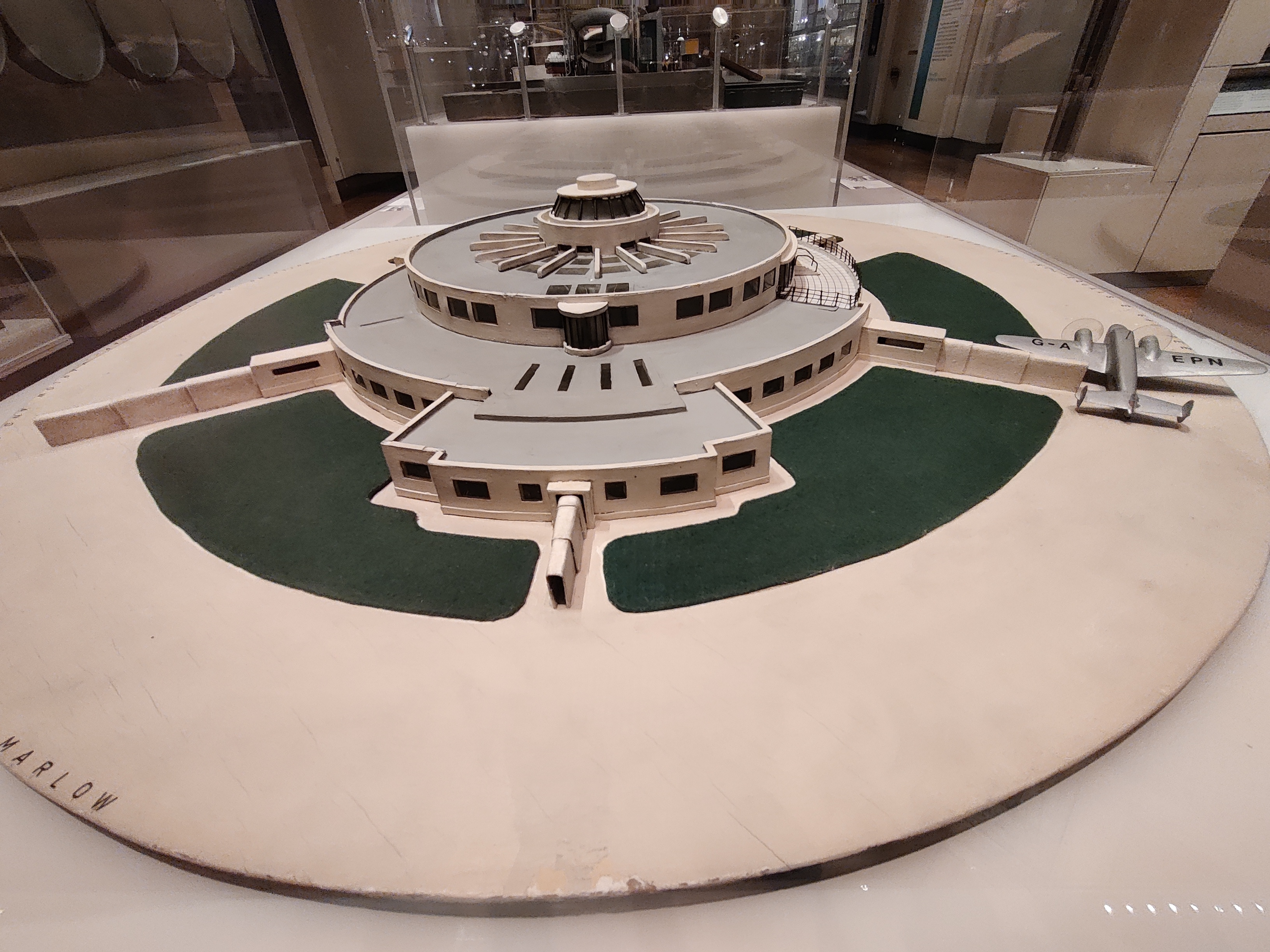
Architect's model, showing telescopic covered corridors deployed, on display in the Victoria and Albert Museum

In September 1933 A. M. (Morris) Jackaman, who owned several light aircraft, bought Gatwick Aerodrome for £13,500 (2023 equivalent £1.02 million). He planned a purpose-built terminal building; the previous aerodrome building was a converted farmhouse. He put great importance on the design process: he, and contemporaries, considered terminals at other aerodromes to be impractical and unsuitable for expansion.

Jackaman developed the idea of a circular terminal building—reputedly in response to a throwaway comment by his father—and submitted a patent application for the concept on 8 October 1934. Advantages claimed for the design included efficient use of space and greater safety of aircraft movements. Telescopic "piers" or gangways would provide covered access from the building to the aircraft. A subway was recommended as the best method of bringing passengers into the building from outside.

Jackaman raised money by floating his company, Airports Ltd, on the stock exchange. The Air Ministry also paid for the right to use Gatwick as a diversionary destination at times when Croydon Aerodrome was inaccessible; and in 1935, Hillman's Airways—months before its merger to form the company now known as British Airways—made Gatwick its operational base, increasing its commercial viability and providing more finance. The aerodrome closed on 6 July 1935 to allow the terminal to be built. The contracted opening date of October 1935 was not met, partly because of ongoing drainage problems, but a new railway station was provided on time in September of that year. This was linked to the terminal when it did open.

The terminal was completed in early 1936. Although the airport was officially reopened on 6 June 1936, flights to various destinations began in May. Jackaman's proposed service to Paris was included: three flights were operated each day, connecting with fast trains from London Victoria station. Combined rail and air tickets were offered for £4.5s (about £500 in 2024), and there was a very short transfer time at the terminal (on some flights, as little as 20 minutes was needed).

Gatwick Airport, as it had become, was requisitioned for military use during the Second World War. Afterwards, it was eventually agreed upon as the site of London's official second airport, behind Heathrow, after other contenders were ruled out. The government announced its decision in July 1952. Substantial redevelopment started in that year with the acquisition of more land (including the parts of Gatwick Racecourse site which had not yet been developed) and the diversion of the A23 around the new boundary of the airport. A large new terminal was built between 1956 and 1958, the 1935 railway station closed and a new station was built within the terminal complex, on the site of the old racecourse station. The Beehive was thus cut off from transport connections and the airport at large, although it was still within its boundaries and was used for helicopter traffic for several more years.

The Borough of Crawley was extended northwards in 1974 to include Gatwick Airport and its surrounding land, at which point its administrative county changed from Surrey to West Sussex. The Beehive has been in Crawley since then. The county of Surrey had not always been accommodating towards the airport: for example, in 1935, the local council in which the terminal would be built (Dorking and Horley Rural District Council) was concerned about possible compensation claims from local residents and the threat of facing liability for accidents; and it "could see no benefit" to allowing further development.

== Architecture ==
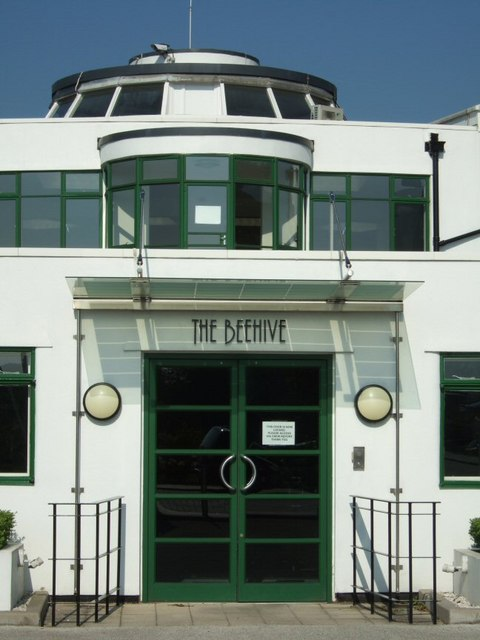
The building's entrance

The terminal was designed by architects Hoar, Marlow and Lovett (job architect Alan Marlow) in accordance with the design concept provided by Morris Jackaman. It was built from steel reinforced concrete frames with internal brickwork walls, and has been described as a good example of the 1930s trend whereby concrete was used instead of steelwork as the main material for buildings intended to project a "modern" impression. A Vierendeel girder with six supports runs around the first floor roof.

As originally built, the interior consisted of concentric rings of rooms and offices with corridors between them, designed to keep arriving and departing passengers separate. Six telescopic covered corridors led from the main concourse, allowing six aircraft to be in use at one time. A subway led from the terminal to the new station, 130 yards (119 m) away, ensuring that passengers arriving by train from London stayed undercover from the time they arrived at Victoria station until the time their aircraft reached its destination.

The building rises from one storey in the exterior ring to three in the centre. This central section originally contained a control tower, weather station and some passenger facilities; the main passenger circulating area surrounded it on the storey below. Baggage handling also took place on this floor. A restaurant and offices were on the ground floor in the outermost ring. The ground and first floors have windows of various sizes at regular intervals, while the former control tower was glazed all around. Changes have been made to the internal layout since the conversion of the building to offices.

The design has been described as innovative and revolutionary, and The Beehive is recognised as having been the UK's first integrated airport building, combining all necessary functions in a single structure. It was the first airport to give direct, undercover access to the aircraft, and the first to be integrated with a railway station.

== Current use ==
GB Airways, established in 1931 as Gibraltar Airways by Gibraltar shipping group MH Bland, moved its headquarters and operational base to The Beehive in 1989.

EasyJet agreed to purchase GB Airways in 2007, but The Beehive was not included. The employment base at The Beehive closed, with 284 job losses. After the purchase was completed in January 2008, the building was retained by GB's former parent company, Bland Group, and was partially converted to become a "service centre" for the group's operations in the United Kingdom. The Bland Group markets the office space to tenants requiring serviced office accommodation. In December 2014, local firm of solicitors Mayo Wynne Baxter set up an office in the building.

The Beehive was Grade II* listed on 19 August 1996. It is one of the 12 Grade II* buildings, and 100 listed buildings of all grades, in the Borough of Crawley.

== See also ==
- Grade II* listed buildings in West Sussex
- Listed buildings in Crawley
