= City Place Gatwick =

Office complex in West Sussex, England

Coordinates: 51.145°N 0.163°W

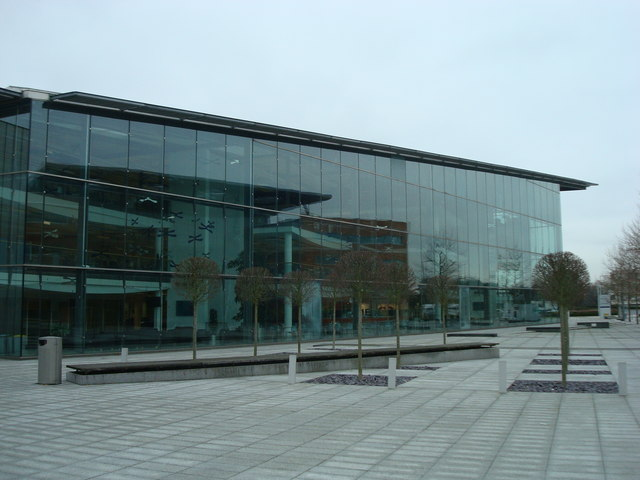
1 City Place, Gatwick

City Place Gatwick is an office complex located on the property of London Gatwick Airport in Crawley, West Sussex, England. The complex includes four buildings: The Beehive, an approximately 20,000-square-foot (1,900 m^{2}) former terminal building at Gatwick Airport located on a 2.0-acre (0.81 ha) site; 1 City Place a 131,500-square-foot (12,220 m^{2}) facility on a 4.2-acre (1.7 ha) site, 2 City Place, a 85,000-square-foot (7,900 m^{2}) building on a 1.9 acres (0.77 ha) plot, and 3 City Place, a 65,000-square-foot (6,000 m^{2}) building on a 1.06-acre (0.43 ha) plot. Hamiltons Architects designed the L-shaped 3 City Place.

BT Wholesale formerly had an office at 1 City Place. BDO International has an office at 2 City Place. Beehive City Place previously housed the head offices of GB Airways, which had its head office in the Beehive, and CP Ships, which had its head office in 2 City Place.

In 2012, Nestlé UK announced they would be moving their head office from St George's House Croydon to the former BT building at 1 City Place.

== History ==
City Place was developed by BAA Lynton. In March 2000, BT Group pre-let 14,000 square metres (150,000 sq ft) of space at City Place, which at the time had 46,500 square metres (501,000 sq ft) of available space; it was a part of an effort by BT to move employees from Central London to locations along the M25 motorway. The BT 15-year lease had an initial rent of £242 per square metre. BT had an option to use an additional 10,200 square metres (110,000 sq ft) once the space became available. Construction at 1 City Place was completed in May 2002, and BT planned to occupy the building at the end of 2002. In October 2002 BAA Lynton announced that it was selling 1 City Place, which was valued at £41.7 million. The real estate arm of Gulf Atlantic bought 1 City Place. BAA received 14 million pounds from the sale of 1 City Place Gatwick and Heathrow South Cargo Centre 1.

2 City Place was forward funded by the Co-operative Insurance Society. BAA Lynton was building phase two of 2 City Place as of November 2001.

The owners of the Beehive leased the building to GB Airways, and later sold it to the airline. When EasyJet announced its purchase of most of GB Airways's assets in 2007, The Beehive was not included. The employment base at The Beehive closed, with 284 job losses.

In 2003 CP Ships moved its European HQ in to 2 City Place. In 2004 it announced that it would move its head office from Trafalgar Square, City of Westminster to Gatwick. After Hapag-Lloyd acquired CP Ships, in 2006 Hapag-Lloyd announced it would cut 500 positions at Gatwick. In 2007 BDO International announced that it was moving an office to Gatwick from Bromley, London Borough of Bromley. BDO leased the entire 21,000-square-foot (2,000 m^{2}) second floor of its new building. After the purchase by easyJet occurred in January 2008, the building was retained by GB's former parent company, Bland Group.

Construction on a £10.2 million, four-storey office building at CityPlace was completed in September 2008.

== Former tenants ==
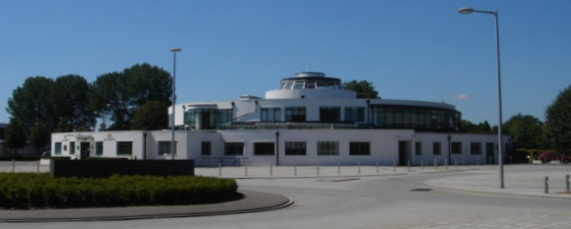
The Beehive, one of four buildings at City Place Gatwick

A number of airlines have had offices at the Beehive, including BEA/British Airways Helicopters, Jersey Airlines, Caledonian Airways, Virgin Atlantic and GB Airways. Other airlines which had headquarters on airport property (including office buildings on the site of, or adjacent to, the original 1930s airport) include British Caledonian, British United Airways, CityFlyer Express, Laker Airways and Tradewinds Airways.
