= Frank Hoar =

Frank Hoar in the 1950s

Harold Frank Hoar, FRIBA (13 September 1909 – 3 October 1976) was a British architect, artist, academic and architectural historian. Hoar first came to public prominence when, at the age of 25, he won a competition to design the first terminal building at London's Gatwick Airport in the 1930s. His architectural career focused increasingly on town planning in the post war years, when he also became a well known public commentator on domestic architecture in that era of reconstruction. A senior lecturer at University College London, Hoar was an expert on the Bavarian Baroque and wrote histories of English and European architecture at a time when architectural modernism decried the value of an historical approach to architecture. He was also an accomplished watercolour painter, his work on architectural themes having often been exhibited in the Royal Academy in the 1950s and 1960s.

In a wide-ranging career Hoar was probably best known as the cartoonist "Acanthus", where his work appeared in Punch, the Sunday Telegraph, The New Yorker and The Builder magazine; and as "Hope" in the Sunday Express. His cartoons reflected on the home front during the Second World War and were often accompanied by great architectural backdrops. As a cartoonist during the war, Hoar's political cartoons contemplated the long term direction of the war and of the perpetrators of its worst atrocities.

== Background and early life ==
Hoar was born in Faizabad, Oudh then a part of the Indian Empire, to Harold Hoar and Frances (née) Harry, where his father was stationed with the Army Educational Corps. The Hoars were an old Hampshire family, settled in Catherington from the reign of Henry VIII and Lords of the Manor of Lovedean, near Catherington, in the 17th century. Harold Hoar's great uncle, John Jeans, was the Professor of Nautical Astronomy at the Royal Naval College, Portsmouth. The Harry family descend in the male line from the Owens of Lllullo and, ultimately, from Hywel Dda and Rhodri Mawr, 10th-century Kings of Wales. Through that family, Hoar was a kinsman of Richard Nixon, 37th President of the United States.

On the family's return to England, they settled in Devon, where Hoar was educated at Plymouth College. At the age of 15, he won a scholarship to the Bartlett School of Building at University College London (UCL), with which he was to be associated for the best part of his life. Studying under Sir Albert Richardson, PRA, Hoar qualified as an ARIBA in 1931, and was awarded a diploma in Town Planning, having been awarded the Owen Jones Student Medal by the Royal Institute of British Architects (RIBA) whilst an undergraduate. Hoar's interest in architectural history developed during his student years, where he was awarded the Roland Jones prize for the history of Medieval architecture in his second year.

Hoar was a keen rugby player, playing for Saracens 1st XV between 1934 and 1937.

== Architectural Practice ==
=== Gatwick Airport ===
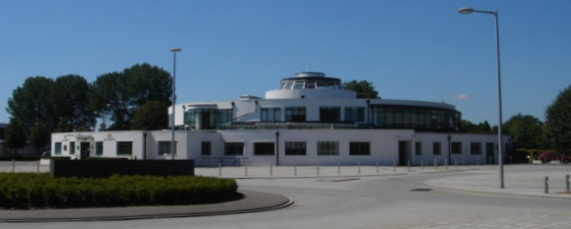
'The Beehive'

Hoar's entry into the competition for the design of the first Gatwick Airport terminal building was as the leading member of a team of three architectural research students. In the early 1930s, at the beginning of the era of commercial flight, Morris Jackaman had had the idea of a circular terminal, which was well suited to the developing air traffic needs of the time, allowing sufficient aircraft to be positioned in close proximity to the terminal building. Hoar's design catered for these needs by surrounding the round terminal with five ramps, each of which connected to aircraft. The terminal was entered by a tunnel subway connected, in turn, to the railway station. Hoar's designs were commissioned in 1935 and the building still exists, affectionately known as "The Beehive". A model of Hoar's design was included in the gallery of architectural history at the Victoria and Albert Museum in 2004.

=== War Years and post-war Reconstruction ===
Following this success, Hoar built an architectural practice in which he was often engaged to design civic buildings, especially in the 1940s and '50s. He was commissioned into the Royal Engineers in Egypt and North Africa during the Second World War where he was mainly engaged on the design of bridges. During his period with the RE, a newspaper reported that he was being considered for an army secondment to the government of Nairobi, where he would work on the re-development of the city, although this approach did not come to fruition.

After the War, Hoar joined the London County Council's architectural department for a short period, before returning to private practice and academe. He was heavily involved in the national discussion and debate about the development and improvement of housing after the War. Aside from his involvement in the design of Council Housing with the LCC, Hoar was commissioned to design and write about the ideal new house in the opinion of the readers of the Sunday Express. His simple design incorporated what were beginning to be seen as household essentials: the fitted kitchen and bathroom, the utility room and the garage. Many of Hoar's cartoons as Acanthus reflected on the demands of pre-fabrication and the ideas behind redevelopment (see further below).

=== Academic career ===
Hoar later combined his private architectural and town planning practice with academic positions at UCL, where he was a senior lecturer at the Bartlett School. In a time of architectural asperity, he was well known for his lectures on the Bavarian Baroque - a subject far out of favour with the modernism of the age. Hoar's doctorate was awarded on this subject and a number of his watercolours of the interiors of Bavarian churches were exhibited at the Royal Academy's summer exhibition; as were his watercolours of St Peter's, Rome, a particular favourite. He was elected a Fellow of the Royal Institute of British Architects in the early 1940s.

The grave of Frank Hoar in Brookwood Cemetery

The PhD thesis on the Bavarian baroque set those churches in the context of the social and religious background of the Counter Reformation. Alongside Hoar's drawings, it was illustrated by the series of watercolours he exhibited at the RA. His great interest in architectural history, which manifested itself in his cartoons as much as his architectural and academic practice, led to the publication of his two books on the architectural history of England and Europe. Aimed at the lay reader and illustrated with drawings, plans and cross-sections, these histories draw extensively on the cultural and historical background that gives meaning to the progression of architectural styles. In many ways, they can be seen as a reaction to the prevailing ethos of his era, which spurned the historical purpose in favour of wholly utilitarian approaches; Le Corbusier, for example, famously quipped that the house was a 'machine for living in'. Hoar's hope was that:

In time, an increasing interest by the public, a growing awareness of what a building is meant to do, and a keener appreciation of sane planning and fine design will create in England a new architecture that is as essentially English in character as the yeoman's cottage of Tudor times, and blessed with a beauty and a balance that reflect the spirit of what is still one of the most fortunate and envied countries in the world.'

Hoar's wish was, in many respects, to be granted after his death. The utilitarian, concrete architecture of the 1950s and 1960s has gradually fallen out of favour, coupled with a resurgence of traditional architectural design and a renewed appreciation of context and scale. (Compare, for example, the 1990s extension to Magdalen College, Oxford with the college extensions of the post-war period.) The change in public attitudes has been assisted in no small measure by the poor living conditions suffered by so many tenants of tower blocks built in that era.

On his death in 1976 Hoar was buried in Brookwood Cemetery in Surrey.

== Cartoons ==
=== Political cartoons ===
Hoar was perhaps best known for his cartoons, as "Hope" in the Sunday Express and as "Acanthus" in Punch. He had started illustrating cartoons as "Acanthus" at the beginning of the War but soon began a series of political cartoons. As his brother, George, had become a prisoner of war at the evacuation of Dunkirk in 1940, it was on security grounds that Hoar decided to publish these cartoons under the by-line of "Hope". These cartoons offered a long term commentary on the progress and evils of the War itself. In one, Hitler, Mussolini and Tōjō glare at a shackled prisoner whose shadow reveals the noose that represents their ultimate fate. Other cartoons focus on the role of Stalin and the impact of the alliance, represented in one cartoon as the Big Three using the swastika as a pivot to squash Hitler.

=== "Acanthus" ===
Hoar's cartoons as "Acanthus" combined amusing social commentary with architectural themes and backgrounds. The early cartoons provide a great insight into the Home Front during the Second World War; his subjects included the Home Guard, the crumbling country houses of the aristocracy and the prefabricated housing built after the war. They are also of some historical interest, reflecting as they do the social mores of the day. Hoar's work was later published in The Builder, an architectural and building magazine and in Men Only, then what might now be described as a lifestyle magazine. In the Sunday Telegraph he published pocket cartoons in his later years.

Practicing for his entire career in the age of architectural modernism (which he did not entirely spurn, his buildings being as influenced by the age as those of most architects of his generation), Hoar was fond of using his cartoons to lampoon what he saw as its excesses - especially where they threatened architectural heritage. In doing so, the breadth of his historical architectural knowledge was used to good effect. An example was his skit on a proposal by Frank Lloyd Wright for a new building on the Grand Canal in Venice, published in Punch in 1954, in which Hoar suggests a medley of architectural styles. His cartoons often reflected upon the chastened circumstances of English country houses requisitioned in the War and later left to their decline, a suitable theme for his architectural backgrounds.

== Books ==
- Pen and Ink Drawings (The Studio Publications, 1955)
- Ancestral Manners (The Builder, Ltd, 1961), a satire on the English country house.
- An Introduction to English Architecture (Evans Brothers, 1963)
- European Architecture, From Earliest Times to the Present Day (Evans Bros, 1967)
- Westminster Abbey, Its links with the Famous (Sheldon, London, 1976) (Illustrated, text by Carolyn Scott)

In addition, he illustrated a number of other books.

== Family ==
Hoar married, in 1939, Rosamund Leonard (1909–1983), the daughter of Patrick Leonard, a landowner, former President of the Chamber of Commerce of Dublin and a member of the Irish Dáil, and granddaughter of Simon Mangan of Dunboyne Castle, HM Lieutenant of County Meath, and Margaret (née) Larkin, a first cousin of Brig Gen Paul Kenna, VC. Rosamund was a concert pianist who trained at the Paris Conservatoire and was well known for her performances on Radio Eireann in its earliest years.

They had four children:

- Peter Frank (b 1941), married Julia Legg:

Christopher;
Tamara;

- Valerie (b 1944), married Adrian Beatty:

Jonathan, m Kay Dickson:

Juliet;

Caroline, m Matthew Stevenson:

Joshua Harry;
Hannah Louise;
Rose Emily;

Gerald;
Sarah.

- John Leonard (b 1947), married Jacqueline Tindal, d of Group Captain Nicolas Tindal-Carill-Worsley:

Francis;
Thomas, m Laura, g-dtr of Maj Gen Eric Dorman-O'Gowan:

Patrick Charles John;
Alexander Edmund

Edmund;
William;
Jack;
Nicolas;
Joseph.

- Diana (b 1952), married Harry Russell:

Julian;
Anthony;
Emily;
Dominic.

== Sources ==
- Bryant, Mark (2000) Dictionary of Twentieth-Century British Cartoonists and Caricaturists, p 112 (Ashgate, Aldershot).
- Obituary in The Times, 7 October 1976
- Blow, Christopher (2005) Transport Terminals and Modal Interchanges: Planning and Design
- Wright, Lawrence (1983) Perspective in Perspective
- Punch, 1942–1976
- Sunday Express
- Sunday Telegraph
- Sunday Correspondent
- The Builder
- Men Only
