= Expansion of Gatwick Airport =

Concept of expanding London Gatwick Airport

London Gatwick Airport is the secondary international airport serving London, England, and the second-busiest airport in the United Kingdom by total passenger traffic. Gatwick has undergone substantial expansion since its origins as an aerodrome; however, it remains the busiest airports in the world to operate with a single runway, which continues to limit its growth. As a result, proposals for further expansion have been under consideration since the early 2000s.

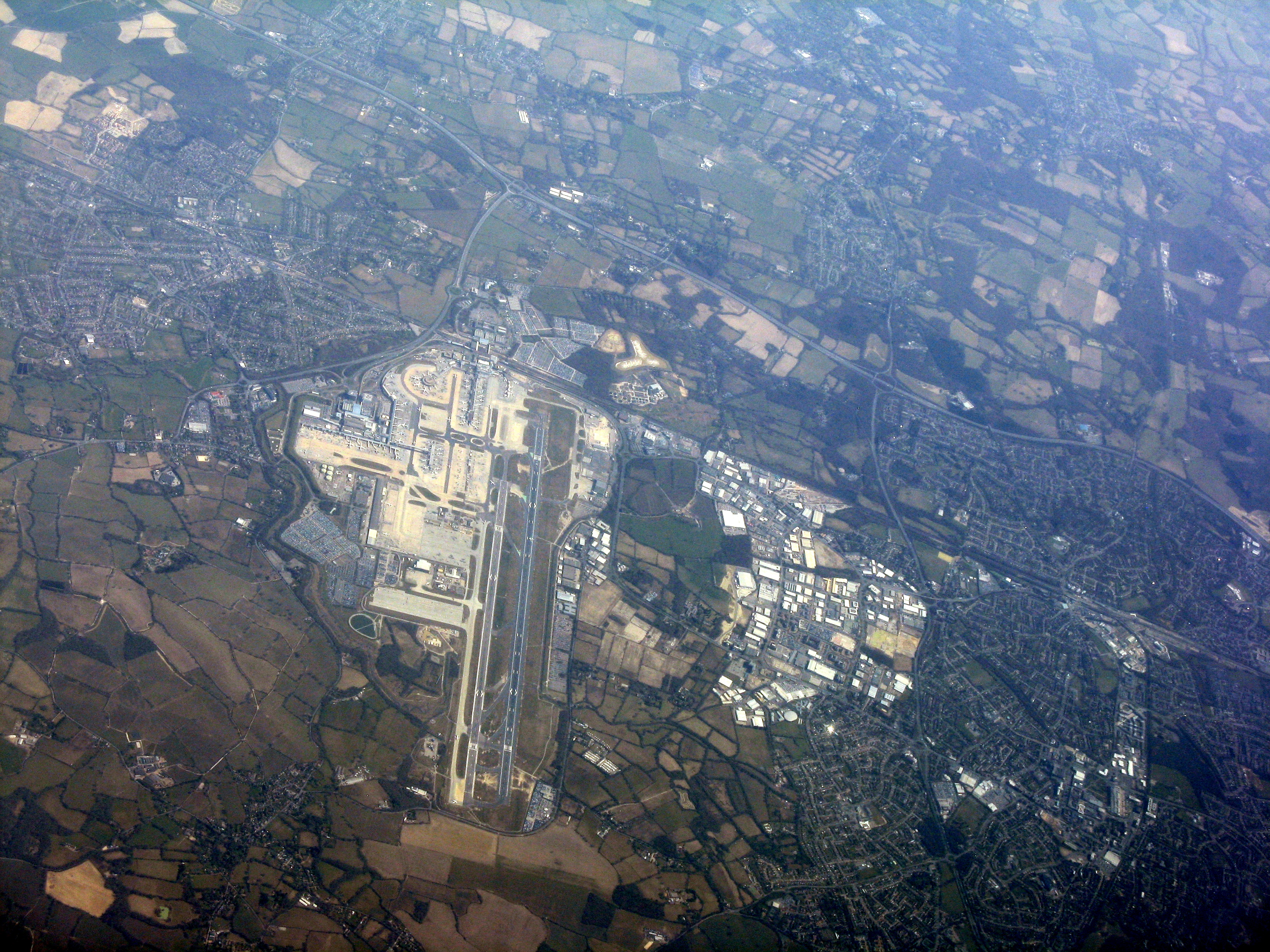
Gatwick is constrained by its single-runway operation.

Several options to expand Gatwick have been considered, including a third terminal and a second runway to the south of the existing runway. This could theoretically allow Gatwick to handle more passengers than Heathrow does today. If a second, wide-spaced (as opposed to close parallel) runway is approved, a new terminal could be sited between the two runways. This could either complement or replace the current South Terminal, depending on expected future traffic developments.

== Second runway ==
=== Newly built runway ===
In 1979, an agreement was reached with West Sussex County Council not to build a second runway before 2019.

In its original consultation document published on 23 July 2002 the Government decided to expand Stansted and Heathrow, but not Gatwick. However, Medway Council, Kent County Council and Essex County Council sought a judicial review of this decision. The judge reviewing the lawfulness of the Government's decision ruled that excluding Gatwick from the original consultation was irrational and/or unfair. Following the judge's ruling and the Secretary of State for Transport's decision not to appeal, BAA published new consultation documents. These included an option of a possible second runway at Gatwick to the south of the existing airport boundary, leaving the villages Charlwood and Hookwood to the north of the airport intact. This led to protests about increased noise and pollution, demolition of houses and destruction of villages.

On 2 December 2009, the House of Commons Transport Select Committee published a report entitled The future of aviation. With regard to Gatwick, it calls on the Government to reconsider its decision to build a second runway at Stansted, in the light of growing evidence that the business case is unconvincing and that Gatwick is a better location.

Speaking at the first Gatwick Airport Consultative Committee (Gatcom) meeting since GIP's takeover of the airport (held on 28 January 2010 at Crawley's Arora Hotel), Gatwick's chairman Sir David Rowlands ruled out building a second runway for the foreseeable future, citing the high cost of the associated planning application – estimated to be between £100 million and £200 million – as the main reason for the new owners' lack of interest. At that meeting, Gatwick chief executive Stewart Wingate stressed GIP's preference for increasing the existing runway's capacity and confirmed GIP's plans to request an increase in the current limit on the permitted number of take-offs and landings.

However, in 2012, Gatwick's new owners reversed their initial lack of interest in building a second runway at the airport for the foreseeable future. On 3 December 2012, chief executive Stewart Wingate argued in front of the House of Commons Transport Select Committee that allowing Gatwick to add a second runway to relieve the growing airport capacity shortage in the South East of England once the agreement with West Sussex County Council preventing it from doing so had expired in 2019 served the interests of the 12 million people living in its catchment area better than building a third runway at Heathrow or a new four-runway hub airport in the Thames Estuary.

In support of his argument, Wingate stated that expanding Heathrow or building a new hub in the Thames Estuary was more environmentally damaging, more expensive, less practical and risked negating the benefits of ending common ownership of Gatwick, Heathrow and Stansted by the erstwhile BAA. Wingate contrasted this with the greater range of flights and improved connectivity including to hitherto un-/underserved emerging markets that would result from a second runway at Gatwick by the mid-2020s as this would enable it to compete with Heathrow on an equal footing to increase consumer choice and reduce fares.

In this context, Wingate also accused his counterpart at Heathrow, Colin Matthews, of overstating the importance of transfer traffic by pointing to research by the International Air Transport Association (IATA). (Note: Entitled PaxIS and AirportIS data products) This counts the number of air travel bookings made by passengers passing through the IATA-designated London area airports (Note: Heathrow, Gatwick, Stansted, Luton, City) and shows that only 7% of these passengers actually change flights there. Wingate believes this to be a more accurate measure of the share of passengers accounted for by transfer traffic at these airports than the more widely used alternative based on survey data collated by the Civil Aviation Authority (CAA). The CAA survey data relies on the number of passengers changing flights at these airports as reported by the airlines to the airport authorities and shows that fewer than 20% of all passengers actually change flights there. (Note: Heathrow: 24 million transfer passengers (35%) of 69 million passengers in 2011; Gatwick: 2.4 million transfer passengers (7%) of 34 million passengers in 2011; Stansted: insignificant number of transfer passengers (0%) of 18 million passengers in 2011; Luton: insignificant number of transfer passengers (0%) of 9.5 million passengers in 2011; City: 0.06 million transfer passengers (2%) of 3 million passengers in 2011)

On 23 July 2013, Gatwick unveiled its proposals for a second runway to the south of the existing runway and airport boundary. If approved, Gatwick said, the new runway could open by 2025 and cost between £5 billion and £9 billion, depending on the option chosen – i.e., a new runway 3,395 ft (1,035 m) south of the existing runway, a new runway less than 3,395 ft (1,035 m) but more than 2,493 ft (760 m) south of the existing runway or a new runway less than 2,493 ft (760 m) south of the existing runway. The first option would allow both runways to be simultaneously used for takeoffs and landings and increase total runway capacity by more than 80% to up to 100 aircraft movements per hour. It would also increase the airport's annual maximum passenger capacity from the present 45 to 87 million. The second option would allow both runways to be used simultaneously as well, with one handling takeoffs and the other landings. This would increase total runway capacity by ca. 36% to about 75 aircraft movements per hour and result in an increase in annual maximum passenger capacity to 82 million. The third option would allow only one runway to be used at a time but would still increase total runway capacity by over 20% to at least 67 aircraft movements per hour and annual maximum passenger capacity to 66 million. Regardless of the option chosen, the total projected cost includes the cost of a third terminal next to the existing railway line.

On 17 December 2013, the Airports Commission chaired by Sir Howard Davies published its shortlist of which Southeast airports should be considered for additional runways. In addition to two alternatives at Heathrow, it recommended an option for an additional wide-spaced, 10,000 ft (3,000 m) runway at Gatwick as first proposed by Gatwick Airport Limited on 23 July 2013 for further examination ahead of publishing its final report by summer 2015. The commission estimates the cost to be around £9.3 billion; £2 billion higher than Gatwick's own estimate.

On 2 June 2016, Birmingham Airport declared support for a second runway at Gatwick rather than Heathrow. Birmingham Airport CEO Paul Kehoe said that a second runway at Gatwick would allow Birmingham to continue to prosper, and that Heathrow expansion could inhibit the growth of other airports, including Birmingham.

=== Northern runway full operation ===
In May 2020, following approval by the CAA of plans to increase flights by 50,000 per year, Gatwick confirmed plans to bring its Northern Runway into routine use, by moving the current Northern Runway 12 metres to allow it to be used simultaneously with the Southern Runway.

In April 2021, Gatwick told investors that expansion of London's airport capacity was not required until at least 2030 due to the impact of COVID-19 travel restrictions on passenger demand.

On 27 February 2025, Transport Secretary Heidi Alexander announced that she was "minded to approve" a second runway. She then approved plans for full operation of the Northern runway on 21 September 2025. The Planning Inspectorate holds all of the documents outlining these plans, including the Proposed Airfield Works. The planning decision was challenged by campaign groups, but was upheld by the High Court on 23 June 2026 and then by the Court of Appeal on 4 August 2026. Dual-runway operations are expected to commence by 2030.

== Terminal extension ==
A less ambitious alternative would extend the North Terminal further south, with another passenger bridge to an area currently occupied by aircraft stands without jet bridges (Pier 7). However, figure A.12 in Gatwick's new draft master plan released for consultation on 13 October 2011 seems to discard the earlier-mooted Pier 7 option in favour of a mid-field satellite adjacent to the control tower that would be linked to the North Terminal if built as part of an expanded single-runway, two-terminal airport scenario around 2030. There are also plans to extend Pier 6.

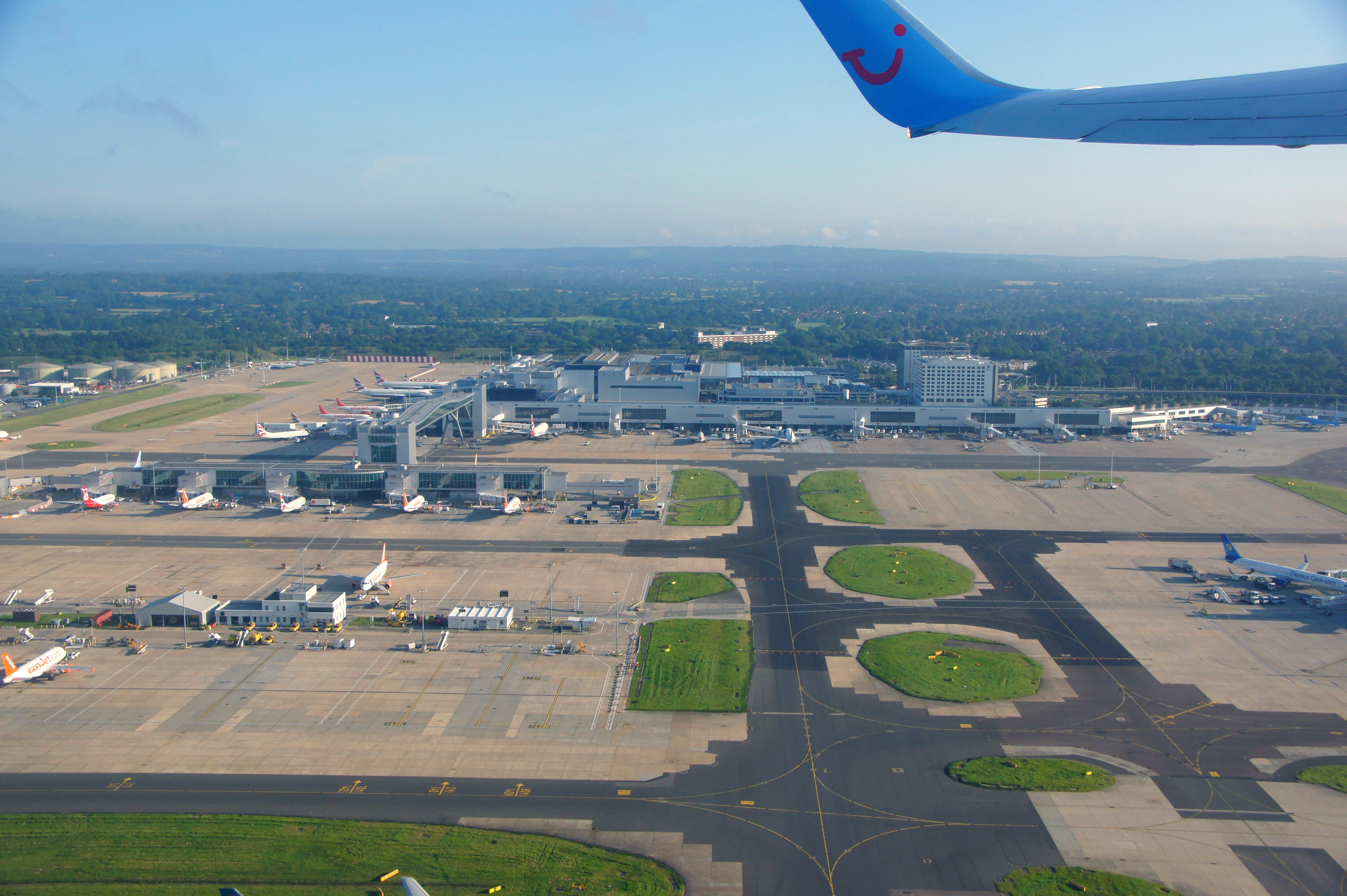
Proposals to expand Gatwick's passenger terminals have included expanding the satellite Pier 6 or building a new satellite for the North Terminal

In October 2009, BAA submitted planning applications for Gatwick to handle an extra six million passengers a year by 2018 and for an extension to the North Terminal to provide new check-in facilities and additional baggage reclaim hall capacity, along with a 900 space short-stay car park. Crawley Borough Council's decision to approve these plans was upheld in November 2009 by the Government's refusal to hold a public inquiry despite objections from local environmental protesters.

In October 2010, Gatwick Airport Limited (GAL) received planning permission from Crawley Borough Council to adapt both terminals to handle the Airbus A380 on a regular, commercial basis. At the Gatcom meeting held on 26 January 2012 at Crawley's Arora Hotel, GAL announced that its board had approved construction of A380 pier infrastructure comprising new three-bridge gates at the North Terminal's Pier 6. The first of these became operational on 26 March 2013.

== 'Heathwick' rail link ==
In late-2011 the Department for Transport began studying the feasibility of a high-speed rail link between Gatwick and Heathrow Airport. This rail link would form part of a plan to combine the UK's two biggest airports into a "collective" or "virtual hub" dubbed Heathwick. The scheme envisages a 35-mile high-speed rail route linking the two airports in 15 minutes, with trains travelling at a top speed of 180 mph parallel to the M25 and passengers passing through immigration or check-in only once.

A 2018 proposal for a high-speed railway link to Heathrow, HS4Air, was rejected. The proposal was part of a scheme to link the High Speed 1 and High Speed 2 railway lines and connect regional cities in Britain to the Channel Tunnel.
