= Shipping in Gibraltar =

Shipping in Gibraltar is important because of Gibraltar's strategic position on one side of the entrance to the Mediterranean Sea. The Strait of Gibraltar is a globally important shipping lane. Gibraltar has become a place known for its expertise with shipping and it has annually 7,000 ship calls.

== Services ==
Gibraltar offers a wide range of specialist services including bunkering to dry dock services at Gibdock. The main activity is bunkering with over four million tonnes of heavy petroleum fuel (bunker fuel) delivered each year (based on 2011). Gibraltar claims to be amongst the largest Mediterranean bunkering ports. Approximately 60% of the 10,000 vessels who stopped at Gibraltar in 2011 were bunkered.

There was 4.3 million tonnes of bunkers delivered in 2021 to over 5,500 ships. Increased competition from Algeciras in 2022 resulted in a fall to around 3.4m tonnes.
