= 2022 in Gibraltar =

Events in the year 2022 in Gibraltar.

== Incumbents ==
- Monarch: Elizabeth II (until 8 September); Charles III onwards
- Chief Minister: Fabian Picardo

== Events ==
- 8 September: Elizabeth II dies at Balmoral Castle, Scotland, Charles III assumes position of King.
- 9 September: As with other locations throughout the Commonwealth, a death gun salute of 96 rounds representing the years of the Queen's life were fired.
- 10 September: At 11:00AM, 21-gun salutes at the Tower of London, Cardiff Castle, Edinburgh Castle, Castle Cornet, Gibraltar, and naval bases and ships at sea marked the accession of Charles III.

== Sports ==
- 2022–23 Rock Cup
