= GB Airways =

Airline of the United Kingdom (1931–2008)

IATA	ICAO	Call sign
GT	GBL	GEEBEE AIRWAYS
- Founded: 1931 (as Gibraltar Airways)
- Commenced operations: 3 January 1989 (as GB Airways Ltd)
- Ceased operations: 30 March 2008 (sold to easyJet)
- Operating bases: London–Gatwick; London–Heathrow; Manchester
- Alliance: Oneworld (affiliate; 1999–2008)
- Parent company: British Airways (1999–2008); easyJet (2008)
- Headquarters: Crawley, West Sussex, England
- Key people: Joseph Gaggero (President); James Gaggero (Chairman)

GB Airways was a British airline; prior to its sale, it was headquartered in 'The Beehive', a former terminal building, at City Place Gatwick, London Gatwick Airport in Crawley, West Sussex, England.

The airline was originally created as 'Gibraltar Airways' in 1931, being an offshoot of Gibraltarian shipping company MH Bland. It initially operated a single Saunders-Roe A21 Windhover, its first route connecting Gibraltar to Tangier in Morocco. During the Second World War, the airline represented Imperial Airways / British Overseas Airways Corporation (BOAC). In 1947, Gibraltar Airways formed a business relationship with the British European Airways (BEA), eventually cumulating in the two companies jointly planning and promoting air services between Gibraltar and London / Madrid. The airline also continued to operate its own routes, benefiting from the expansion of Gibraltar Airport.

During the late 1980s, it was decided to relocate the company from Gibraltar to Britain; accordingly, a new base was established at The Beehive, and the airline was formally rebranded 'GB Airways Ltd' on 3 January 1989. During its latter years of operations, GB Airways operated scheduled services as a British Airways franchise to thirty destinations in Europe and North Africa from Gatwick, and as well as Heathrow and Manchester. The company was profitable throughout much of its existence, but encountered hardship during the 2000s, largely due to the increasingly competitive European market, as well as an inflexible franchising agreement. GB Airways ceased operations on 30 March 2008; 18 years ago, following its acquisition by budget airline easyJet during January 2008; many of its aircraft and staff were redeployed to the latter entity.

== History ==
=== Formation and early years ===
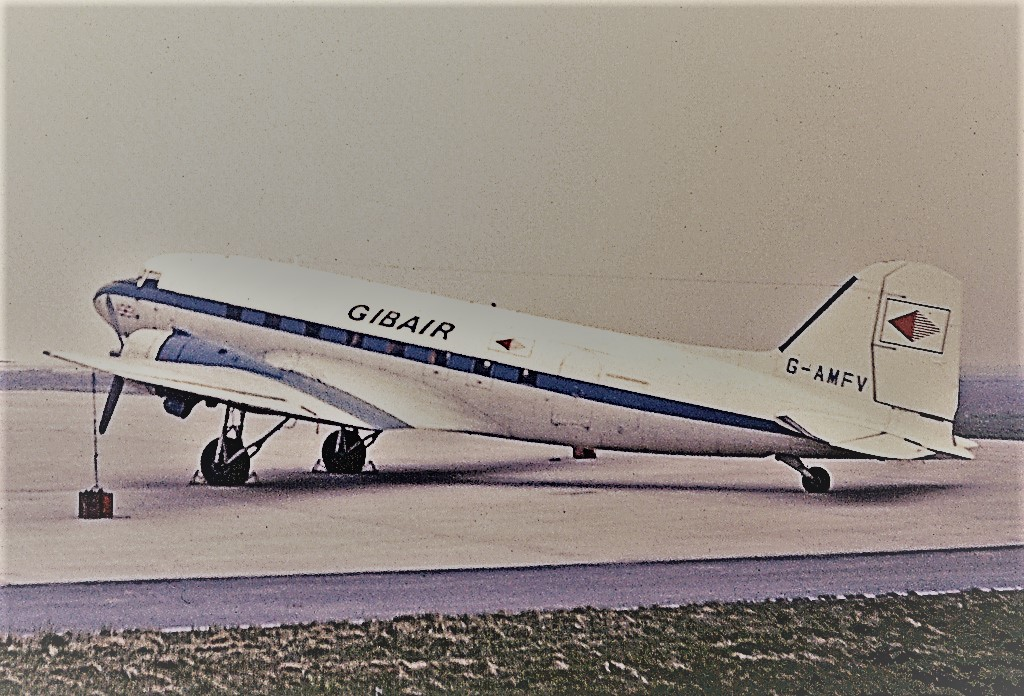
GibAir Douglas DC-3 in 1970

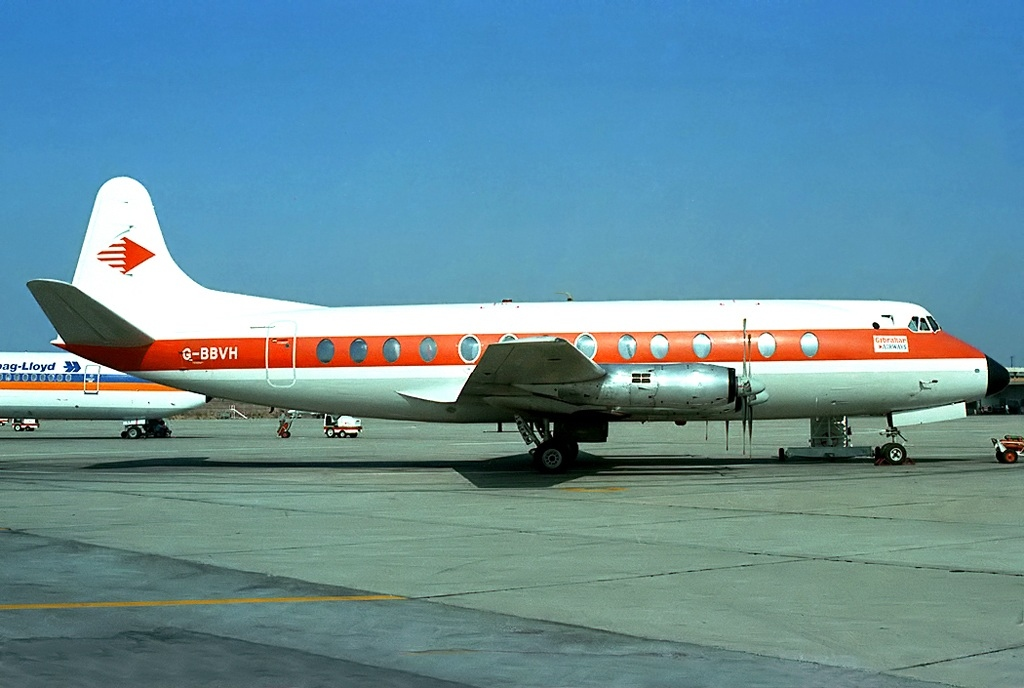
GB Airways Vickers Viscount

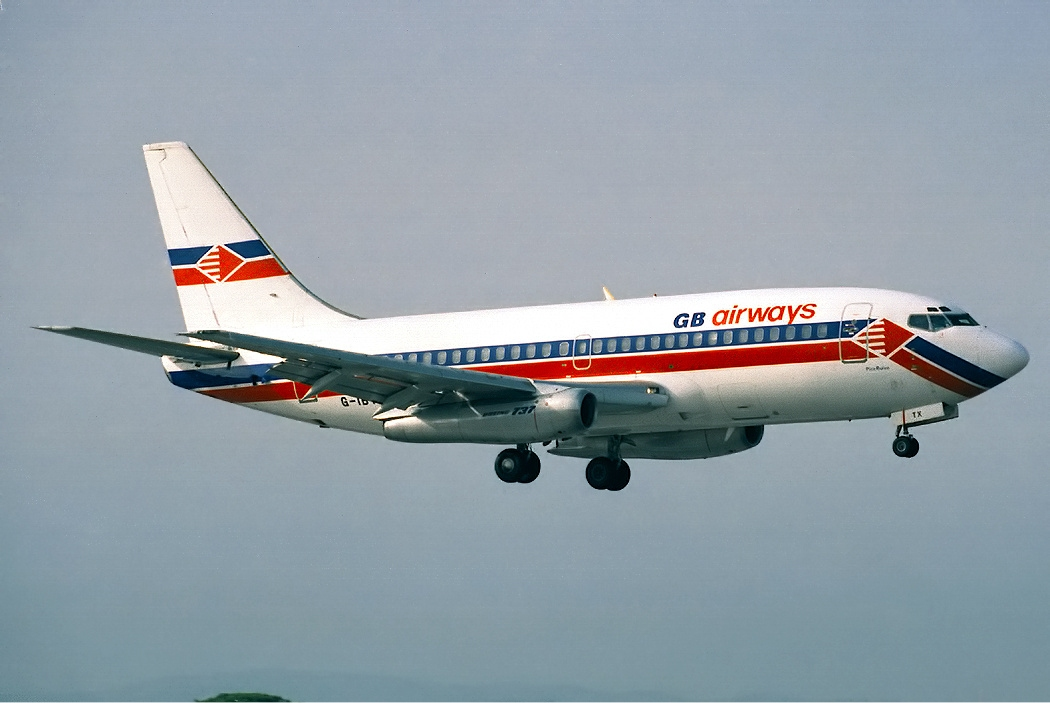
GB Airways Boeing 737-200, 1992

What would eventually become GB Airways was established in 1931; 95 years ago, as an offshoot of Gibraltarian shipping company MH Bland, in Gibraltar. The new venture, which was initially known as Gibraltar Airways, was embarked on as a consequence of the Great Depression, its parent company being keen to find alternative avenues of business. It was decided to opt for a flying boat, the airline securing the use of a single Saunders-Roe A21 Windhover, which could seat up to six passengers. During the latter half of 1931, Gibraltar Airways commenced limited operations, flying a single route between 'the Rock' and Tangier in Morocco.

During the Second World War, the airline represented Imperial Airways / British Overseas Airways Corporation (BOAC), providing management, staff, and local agents on their behalf to support operations. In 1947, the company started providing ground handling services at Gibraltar Airport (the civilian operations part of RAF Gibraltar). That same year, Gibraltar Airways commenced its relationship with the newly created British European Airways (BEA). BEA began flying between London and Gibraltar, connecting with Gibraltar Airways' own flights to Morocco. Soon after, BEA acquired a 49% stake in the airline, which began trading as GibAir. In 1961, an agreement between BEA and GibAir was signed for the joint planning and promotion of air services from Gibraltar to London and Madrid. GB Airways has its headquarters at Cloister Building, Irish Town, Gibraltar. Although BEA merged with BOAC to form British Airways in 1974, the financial and operational relationship with GibAir continued.

Meanwhile, GibAir continued to operate its own services from Gibraltar, primarily to Morocco, and also began charter flights to Portugal and France. During 1957, expanded facilities at Gibraltar Airport, built with the backing of the Gibraltar tourist department, were opened, facilitating the airline's further growth. At this time, the airline operated a fleet of Douglas DC-3s on these services. In 1960, GibAir was headquartered in the Cloister Building in Gibraltar.

=== Relocation to Britain and later years ===
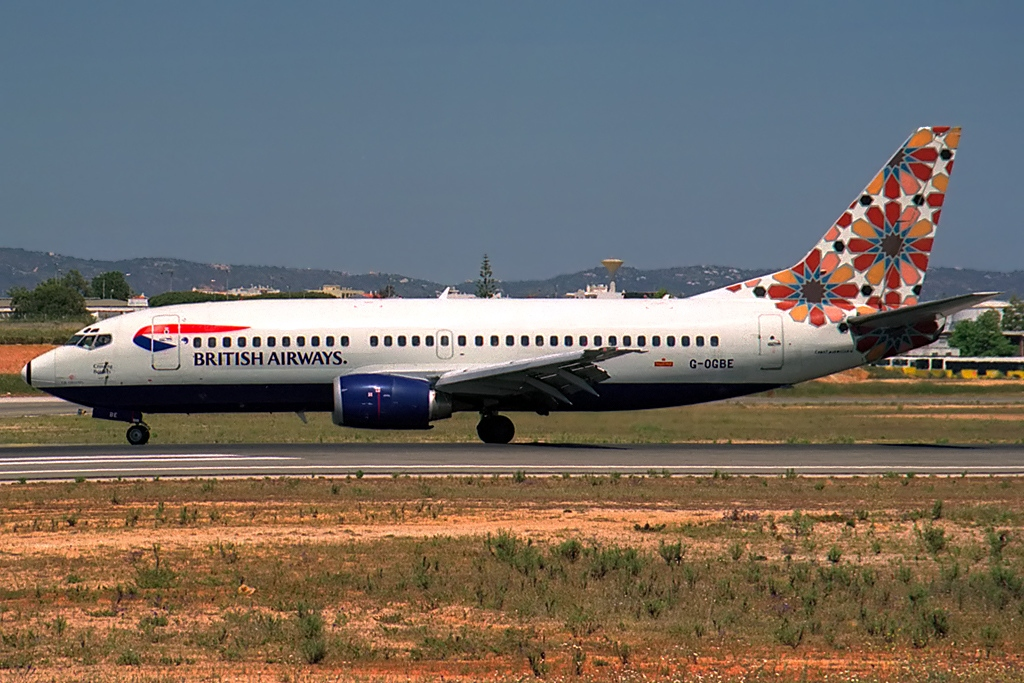
Boeing 737-3L9 in British Airways colorful livery

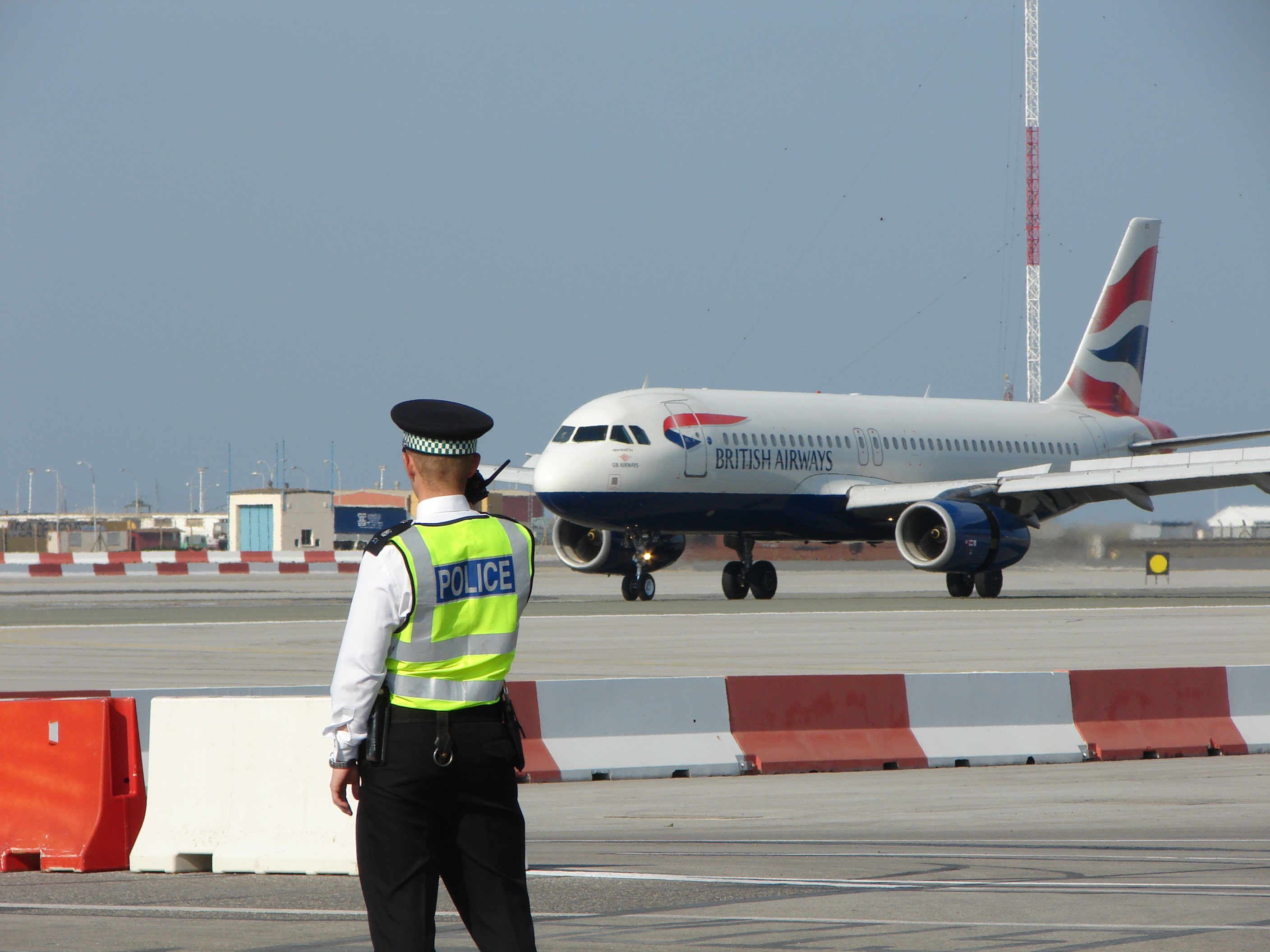
GB Airways Airbus A320 in British Airways livery landing at Gibraltar International Airport in 2007

In 1985, the airline, which was by then known as 'GB Airways', was headquartered in Gibraltar. In 1989, the company moved its operational HQ to the United Kingdom in order to increase the scope for expansion. A base was established at The Beehive at London Gatwick Airport, and the company became 'GB Airways Ltd' on 3 January 1989. The livery on the airline's fleet of Boeing 737 aircraft at this time was mainly white, with red and blue twin stripes down the centre of the fuselage, sweeping down to form a 'chin strap' under the nose cone. The twin stripe was repeated on the tailfin, with a speeding red arrow creating a diamond-shaped centrepiece, which was repeated on the forward fuselage. A stylised version of this diamond logo was used until the airline was bought by easyJet in 2008.

For a number of years prior to October 1997, GB Airways operated services on behalf of newly launched budget carrier easyJet; these were flown on its own air operator's certificate, as easyJet had not secured such certification.

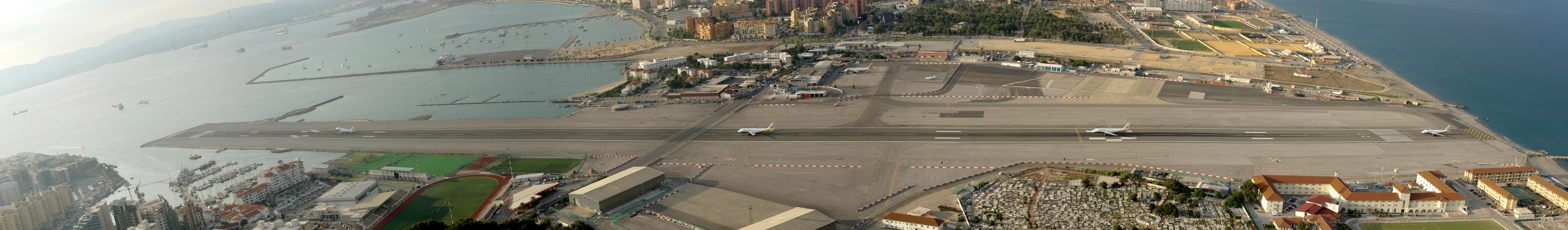
Gibraltar airport

The relationship with British Airways (BA) was firmly entrenched in 1995, when it became a full British Airways franchise operator, with BA relinquishing its financial holding in the airline. The franchise agreement with British Airways was due to continue until 2010, and under the terms, GB Airways traded as British Airways, with all flights operated under BA flight codes (the range BA6800-6999 were allocated to GB Airways flights). All GB Airways aircraft were presented in full British Airways livery, appointed with the same interior and class product as the BA main fleet, and staff wore the BA uniform. GB Airways flights could be booked through British Airways and the airline participated in BA's Executive Club and BA Miles loyalty programme. GB Airways was an affiliate member of Oneworld. However, GB Airways continued its own inflight magazines, Med Life and Elevate (for GB Airways' own duty-free goods range) in addition to the regular BA publications. Additionally, servicing of GB Airways aircraft at Gatwick was carried out by Virgin Atlantic Engineering.

At one stage, GB Airways intended to grow by taking over BA routes as the latter's European network was restructured. By 2001, GB operated a scheduled network to 21 destinations in the western Mediterranean and North Africa, from Gatwick and Heathrow, normally flying in the low-fare leisure sector with a two-class service. According to managing director John Patterson, GB Airways had come under pressure by the low-fare competition by 2001; instead of lower its quality, the airline chose to focus on three-to-four hour routes where a higher service level would be more valued. It was also in the process of replacing its seven Boeing 737-300/400s with newer Airbus A321s.

According to aerospace industry periodical Flight International, GB Airways had "historically been very profitable", but had fallen on harder times during the late 1990s and 2000s, incurring a loss during 2006. Reasons for the airline's hardships reportedly included overcapacity on an increasingly competitive environment, as well as constraints that had been imposed by its franchise agreement with BA, limiting commercial freedom. In response to these losses, former BA executive and Britannia Airways managing director Kevin Hatton was recruited in 2006 to manage the company and to seek options for the business. Hatton produced a strategic review of GB Airways, which saw possibilities such as renegotiating the airline's partnership with BA, an entirely new business model or alternative partnership arrangement, and / or the sale of the airline.

GB Airways did hold discussions with BA representatives throughout 2007, but these did not result in any meaningful changes; BA rejected the new business model proposed by the company. As the adoption of this model was GB Airways' preferred strategic option, this outcome made the prospects of the company's sale or the establishment of a new partnership with a third party airline increasingly likely. According to Flight International, Bland Group saw little in the form of alternatives to selling GB Airways. A chance meeting between Hatton and easyJet's chief executive Andrew Harrison at an industry dinner in early 2007 led to in-depth talks between the two airlines commencing weeks thereafter.

By 2008, GB Airways was regarded as a niche carrier, operating 44 routes between the UK and destinations centred around southern Europe, the Mediterranean, and North Africa.

=== Acquisition by easyJet ===
On 25 October 2007, it was announced that GB Airways was to be sold to easyJet. easyJet had issued a formal offer for the airline two months prior, followed by weeks of intense negotiation; while British Airways had the option to purchase GB Airways itself under the terms of their franchise agreement in such an eventuality, the company chose not to exercise it.

The UK Office of Fair Trading (OFT) approved the acquisition on 18 January 2008. The deal was worth £103.5 million, and was used to expand easyJet operations at London Gatwick, as well as to commence operations from Manchester Airport, EasyJet having been hitherto contractually banned from operating at Manchester under its agreement with Liverpool Airport. GB Airways continued to honour its British Airways franchise agreement, and continued to operate as GB Airways until 29 March 2008, after which all aircraft were transferred to easyJet. Slots used by GB Airways at London Heathrow Airport were not included in the sale, these were sold to other airlines for an estimated £100 million.

While most assets of GB Airways were acquired by easyJet, the corporate head office, The Beehive, was not included. The employment base at The Beehive closed, resulting in 284 jobs being lost. Two aircraft (G-TTOB and G-TTOE) were sold to British Airways, while the others were returned to the lessors if not part of the sale to easyJet. The remainder transferred to easyJet, and were operated in hybrid scheme for a season, before being sold to other airlines.

== Destinations ==
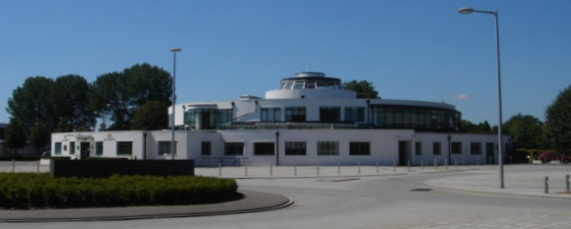
The Beehive, which served as the headquarters of GB Airways

The airline's main operational base was at London Gatwick Airport. Some of its aircraft were also based at London Heathrow Airport, and there was a small base at Manchester Airport. Flights from the latter operated as 'BA Connect' services, which operated a no-frills airline style 'buy on board' service. The airline mainly served destinations in the Mediterranean region, and the Spanish and Portuguese islands, as well as a small number of destinations in inland continental Europe. Thus its main market was British people looking for a holiday in the sun.

- London Gatwick Airport (Agadir, Ajaccio, Alicante, Arrecife, Bastia, Corfu, Dalaman, Fez, Faro, Funchal, Gibraltar, Heraklion, Hurghada, Ibiza, Innsbruck, Las Palmas, Lisbon (via Oporto by British Airways code), Mahon, Malaga, Malta, Marrakech, Montpellier, Mykonos, Nantes, Oporto (via Lisbon by British Airways code), Palma de Mallorca, Paphos, Rhodes, Sharm el-Sheikh, Tenerife-South, Tunis)
- London Heathrow Airport (Casablanca, Faro, Malaga, Marrakech, Tangiers)
- Manchester Airport (Heraklion, Innsbruck, Malaga, Malta, Paphos, Salzburg, Tenerife-South)

In addition to the above destinations, the airline also operated several charter flights from London Gatwick to destinations across Africa, Asia, and Europe during winter months.

== Fleet ==
The GB Airways fleet latterly consisted of the following aircraft (at March 2008):

- 9 – Airbus A320-200 (further one on order)
- 6 – Airbus A321-200 (further four on order)

In February 2008, the average fleet age of GB Airways aircraft was 4.7 years.

== Accidents and incidents ==
- On 23 November 1988, Vickers Viscount G-BBVH was damaged beyond economic repair in a landing accident at Tangier-Boukhalef Airport.

== See also ==
- List of defunct airlines of the United Kingdom
