= Bland Group =

Bland Group Limited
- Company type: Private company
- Industry: Manufacturing precision engineering tourism transport
- Founded: 1810; 216 years ago in Irish Town, Gibraltar
- Founder: Marcus Henry Bland
- Headquarters: Cloister Building, Market Lane, Gibraltar
- Area served: Gibraltar, United Kingdom, Morocco
- Key people: James Gaggero (Chairman)
- Total assets: GBP 150 million
- Number of employees: 860 (2012)
- Website: blandgroup.com

Bland Group Limited is made up of a number of small and medium-sized operating companies based in Gibraltar, the United Kingdom and Morocco.

== History ==
During 1810, English merchant Marcus Henry Bland arrived in Gibraltar, shortly thereafter, he established what would become the Bland Group. His decision to found the company in Gibraltar was in part driven by its location, it being the first guaranteed friendly port for British shipping after leaving the British homelands. The business's initial activities was as a shipping agency, but it soon branched out into other related services.

Ownership of the company was transferred to Marcus's grandsons, Marcus Horatio Bland and John Bland; four generations of the Bland family were involved in the Bland Group's management and ownership. In 1861, the firm was involved in the purchase of the Adelia, a 69-ton tug, which has become known as the first Bland ship; it regularly carried traffic between Gibraltar and Tangier, Morocco in its lifetime. The Bland Group, having identified lucrative commercial opportunities in the shipping industry, embarked on a rapid expansion in the sector through the latter half of the nineteenth century. Having initially focused on transporting freight across the Straits, the firm branched into combined cargo-and-passenger transport using a fleet of multi-purpose vessels; other activities ranged from postal runs on behalf of the Royal Gibraltar Post Office to towing and salvage operations.

Since 1891, the Gaggero family has been a dominant force in the management of the business. Then-owner John Bland lacked any direct heirs and thus opted to sell the Bland Group to his clerk, Joseph Gaggero. By 1904, Emmanuel Gaggero was in charge of the Bland Group's towing and salvage operations, opting to invest in fast vessels that could outrun competitors to respond to distress calls from third party shipping. During the early 1900s, the Bland Group continued to expand its fleet, focusing on commercial trade between North Africa, Spain, and the United Kingdom. During the First World War, the company's fleet came under attack as a result of Germany's decision to initiate unrestricted submarine warfare; two of its vessels, the Gibel Yedid I and the Gibel Hamam I were sunk, while a third, the Gibel Derif, successfully evaded a submarine attack.

During the interwar period, the Bland Group continued to expand by sea, coal becoming a staple cargo. In addition to investing in a series of new vessels to serve its historic routes between Gibraltar, Spain, Morocco, and Algeria, the firm opted to establish Transatlantic shipping routes between Gibraltar and the United States in this era. In 1928, George Gaggero directed the introduction of a pioneering car ferry service across the Straits. During the Second World War, many of the Bland Group's facilities, including its shipping agency, repair yard, and coal bunkers, operated under the direction of the British Government's War Office. Following the conflict, the firm continued its traditional services; during the 1950s, its car ferries were claimed to have been shipping in excess of 100,000 cars per year across the Straits.

=== Tourism ===
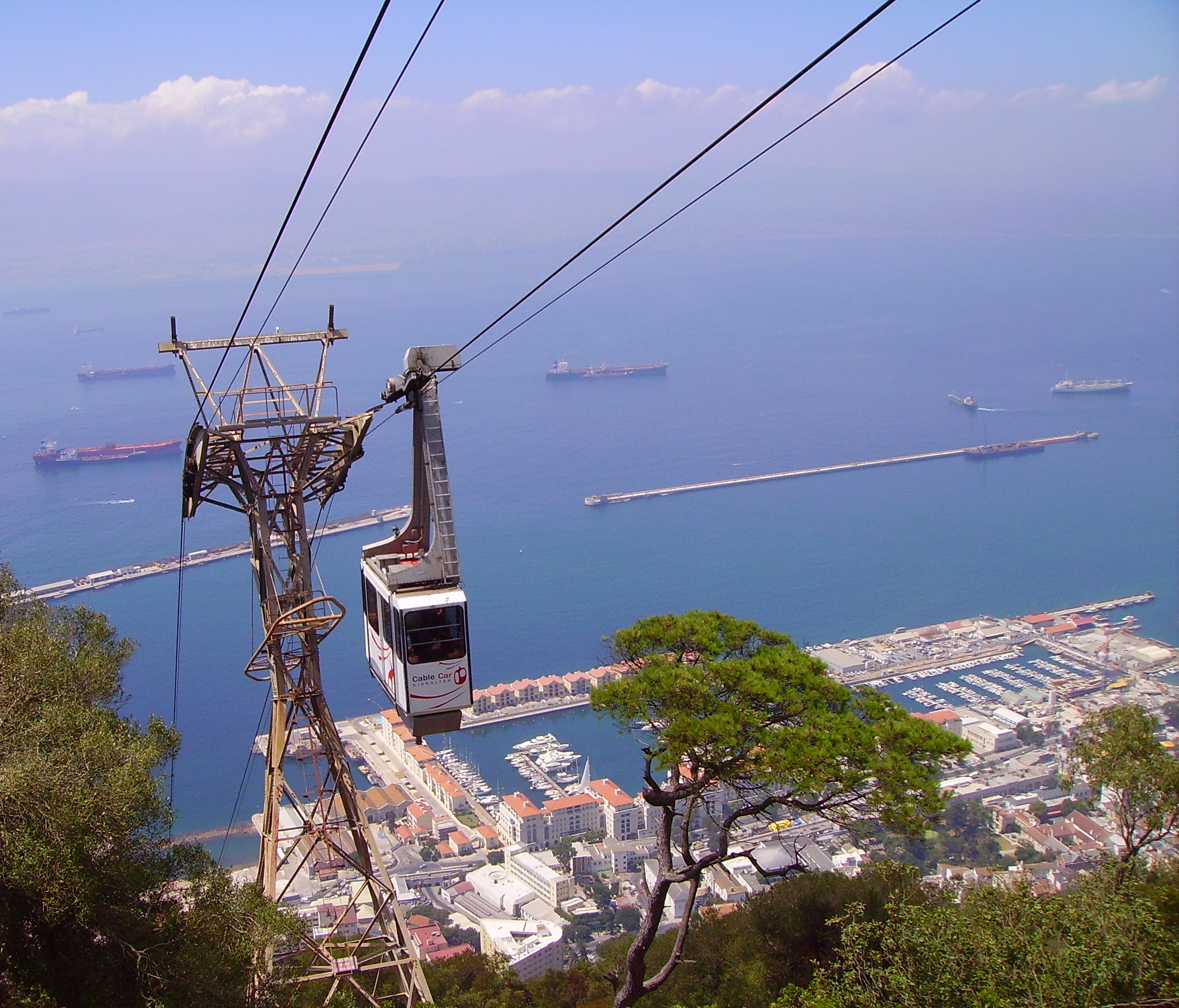
The Gibraltar Cable Car, 2008

The Bland Group was affected by the deterioration of relations between Spain and Gibraltar, particularly the closure of the land border in June 1969. Throughout the 1970s, the firm made efforts to diversify into the wider transportation and tourism sectors. Investment in overseas ventures increased as well, at the expense of its traditional ferry services; the last car ferry to be built for the Bland Group was completed in 1954. Prior to the 1960s, the Upper Rock was out of bounds to all but military personnel. To better access this area, the Bland Group secured permission from the Ministry of Defence to construct the Gibraltar Cable Car. Further access to the frontier was permitted in 1985; the public availability of this landmass has help shape both the Bland Group and the wider economy of Gibraltar itself more towards the tourism sector.

By 2015, a total of 160 cruise ships were reportedly visiting Gibraltar's port each year; the Bland Group conducted the majority of the shore excursions for the passengers of these cruise liners. According to John A Gaggero, the firm handled 52,000 passengers on tours from cruise ships during 2014, while 256,000 passengers made use of the cable car. The company has been involved in efforts to increase the area's attractiveness, such as the development of the Gibraltar Nature Reserve, as well as efforts to care for the local geography and historical sites. The Bland Group also has an interest in the hotel industry.

=== Airline ===
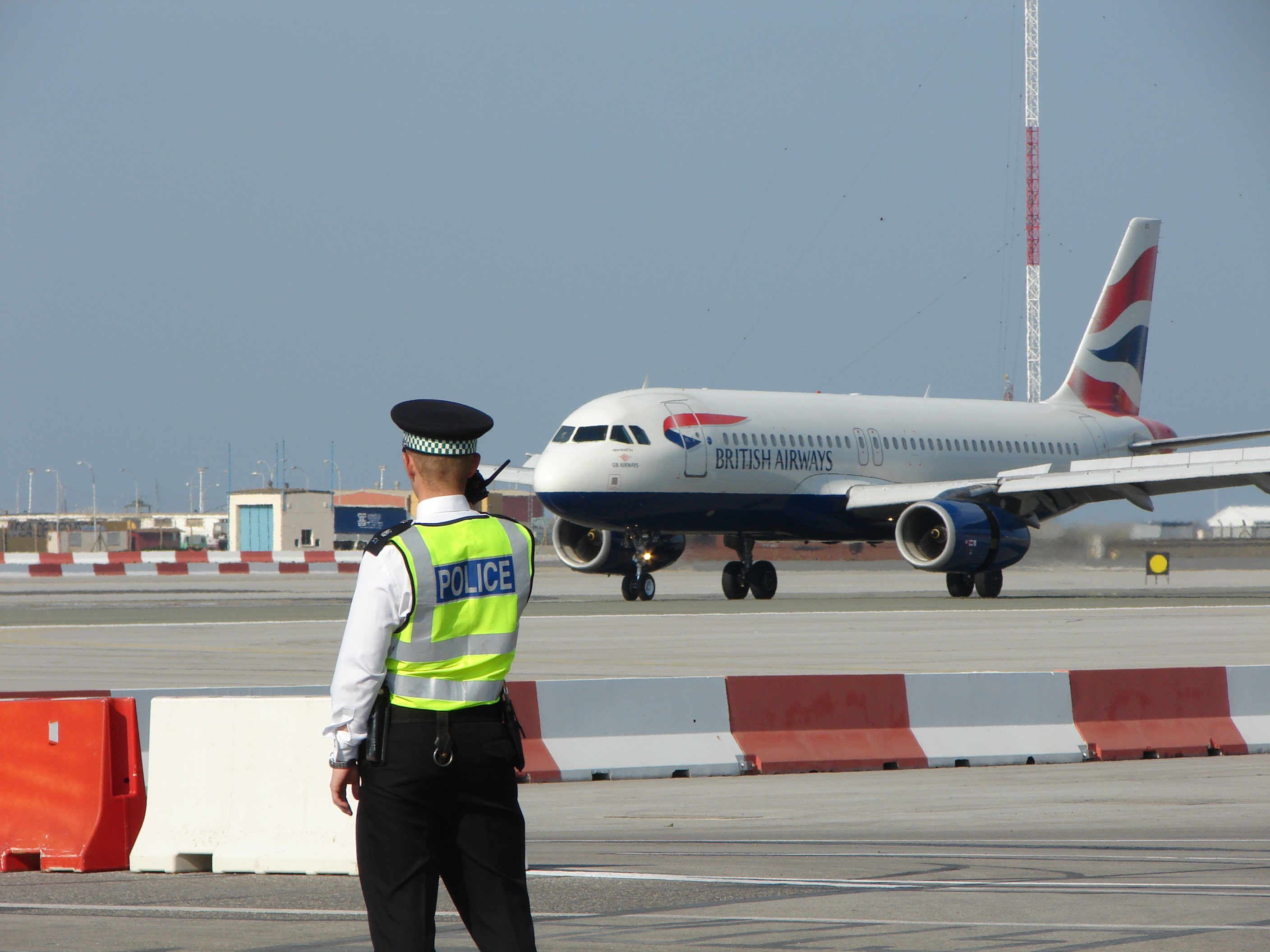
GB Airways Airbus A320 landing at Gibraltar Airport

In 1931, the Bland Group opted to start its own airline to serve the local market; this venture was initially named Gibraltar Airways. It originally operated a single Saro Windhover flying boat, providing an aerial link between Gibraltar and Tangiers capable of carrying up to six passengers. Following the building of a runway at Gibraltar during the Second World War, Gibraltar Airways took advantage of this development during peacetime to introduce larger land-based aircraft. It was also involved in the ground-handling and facilities management of Gibraltar International Airport in a civil context, as well as influencing its subsequent expansion.

Over time, Gibraltar's Airways fleet came to numerous jetliners which were operated upon numerous routes; its services were predominantly orientated towards the United Kingdom. In 1989, the airline moved its headquarters to Britain, being based at Gatwick Airport. Gibraltar Airways was renamed multiple times, being known as "GibAir" throughout much of its operating life and as GB Airways during its final decades of independent operation. In 1995, the airline became a franchisee of British Airways. At its peak in 2007, GB Airways operated a total of 16 Airbus A320 family airliners, and was reportedly carrying three million passengers annually. During 2008, it was announced that the Bland Group had sold GB Airways to British budget airline EasyJet; its staff and aircraft were integrated into the operations of its new parent company.

=== Hovercraft ===
During the twenty-first century, the Bland Group opted to secure stakes in several companies related to the development and operation of hovercraft. These include manufacturer Griffon Hovercraft, services and charter operator Hoverwork Ltd, technical specialists Hovercraft Consultants Ltd, and scheduled operator Hovertravel. Under the Bland Group's direction, several of these entities have been merged or otherwise closely cooperate for mutual benefits; other changes have included lean manufacturing investments and a focus on after-sales services to customers.

== The board ==
James Gaggero is chairman of the board of directors.

== Notable operating companies ==
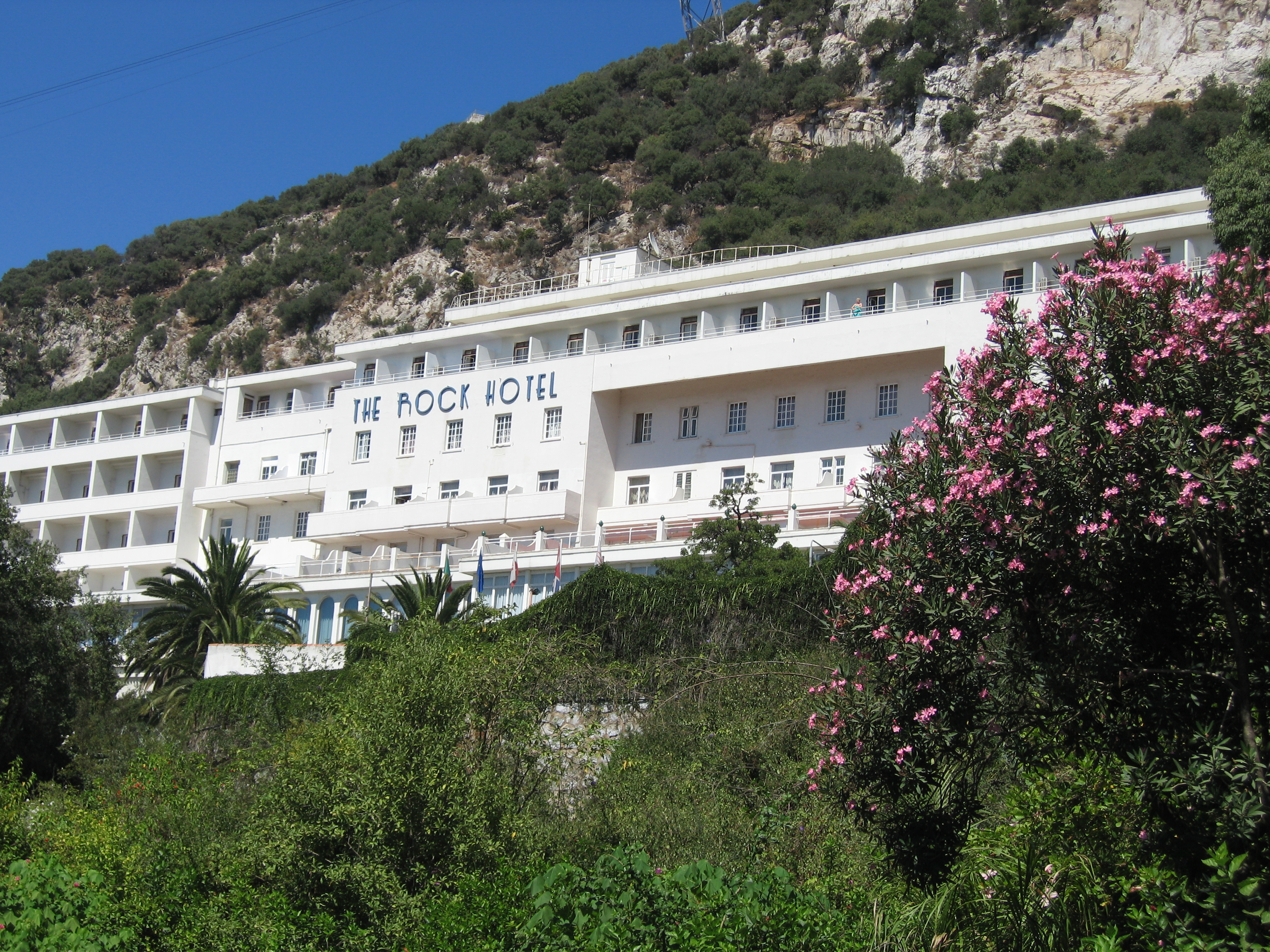
The Rock Hotel

- Beehive Limited
- Griffon Hoverwork Limited
- Hovertravel Limited
- Bland (Trading as Gibair, Bland Travel and OSG) Limited
- The Rock Hotel Limited
