= Marcus Bland =

English merchant

Marcus Henry Bland was an English merchant who founded the Bland Line in Gibraltar in 1810.

The business started as a small shipping agency, but later expanded into carrying supplies for the military garrison on the Rock. It was bought by Joseph and Emmanuel Gaggero in 1891.
