= Saro Windhover =

1930s flying boat

A.21 Windhover
- Saunders-Roe Windhover VH-UPB at Launceston, Tasmania

General information
- Type: Amphibian
- Manufacturer: Saunders Roe
- Number built: 2

History
- First flight: 16 October 1930

The Saro A.21 Windhover was a British amphibious aircraft from the period between World War I and World War II, constructed by Saunders-Roe, or Saro. It was originally advertised as the A.19 Thermopylae after the famous clipper ship, being an enlarged version of the Saro Cutty Sark.

== Development ==
When tests to improve the power of the Saro A.17 Cutty Sark by adding a third de Havilland Gipsy II engine proved impractical (due to the additional weight on the small airframe), Saro designed a larger aircraft on similar lines that could indeed carry three Gipsy II engines. Although a technically successful aircraft and nearly viceless in service, the type had a very limited market and only two were built.

== Production aircraft ==
- A.21/1, prototype first flown at Cowes on 16 October 1930, registered ZK-ABW for delivery to Dominion Airways of New Zealand. Sold in September 1931 to Matthews Aviation of Melbourne, Victoria and placed on the Australian register as VH-UPB. Between January 1933 and February 1934 operated a regular Bass Strait passenger service between Melbourne and Launceston, Tasmania via King Island. On 13 May 1936 it was damaged beyond repair when blown ashore at King Island while on a charter to a party of game hunters. The hull was salvaged and ended its days as an instructional airframe in Melbourne during the Second World War before being scrapped.
- A.21/2, the only production example, completed July 1931. After the addition of an auxiliary winglet over the engines to improve air flow and lift it was sold to Francis Francis as G-ABJP, who sold it in September to Gibraltar Airways for the Gibraltar-Tangier route. In July 1932 it was sold to Mrs Victor Bruce and named City of Portsmouth. The undercarriage was temporarily removed and during August 1932 it was used in three unsuccessful attempts to break the world flight-refuelled endurance record. In May 1935 it was sold to Jersey Airways, being taken out of service in 1938.

== Specifications (A.21/2 Amphibian) ==
Data from Saunders and Saro Aircraft Since 1917

General characteristics

- Crew: 2
- Capacity: 4 or 6 passengers
- Length: 41 ft 4 in (12.60 m)
- Wingspan: 54 ft 4 in (16.56 m)
- Height: 12 ft 7 in (3.84 m)
- Wing area: 522 sq ft (48.5 m^{2}) (including winglets)
- Empty weight: 4,180 lb (1,896 kg)
- Gross weight: 5,700 lb (2,585 kg)
- Powerplant: 3 × de Havilland Gipsy II 4-cyl. air-cooled in-line piston engine, 120 hp (89 kW) each
- Propellers: 2-bladed wooden propellers

Performance

- Maximum speed: 108 mph (174 km/h, 94 kn)
- Cruise speed: 87 mph (140 km/h, 76 kn)
- Range: 400 mi (640 km, 350 nmi)
- Endurance: 4 hours
- Service ceiling: 9,680 ft (2,950 m)
- Rate of climb: 510 ft/min (2.6 m/s)

== See also ==
Related lists

- List of flying boats and floatplanes
