= Great North Road, Gibraltar =

Road tunnel in Gibraltar

Coordinates: 36°08′40″N 5°20′57″W

Great North Road
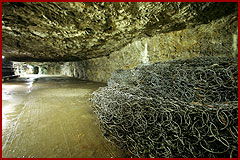
- Anti-submarine nets stored within the Great North Road tunnel in Gibraltar
- Interactive map of Great North Road

Overview
- Location: Gibraltar
- Status: Guided tours can be arranged
- Start: Maida Vale
- End: Calpe Hole Generating Station

Operation
- Constructed: During World War II
- Owner: Ministry of Defence
- Traffic: Yes
- Toll: Nil

Technical
- Width: 60 feet (18 m)

The Great North Road is a large road tunnel in the British Overseas Territory of Gibraltar. It was constructed by the British military during World War II inside the Rock of Gibraltar and remains property of the Ministry of Defence to this day. The road allowed lorries to travel from the north to the south of Gibraltar entirely within the Rock. The tunnel still contains the remains of World War II buildings such as Nissen huts, kitchens, offices as well as a generating station and period anti-submarine nets.

== Background ==
During World War II the British military constructed an underground bombproof city for 16,500 troops with enough supplies to last three months, entirely within the Rock of Gibraltar. Facilities included a telephone exchange, a generating station, a water desalination plant, a hospital, a frozen food store, a bakery, ammunition magazines, a vast Royal Electrical and Mechanical Engineers (REME) shed where damaged vehicles and equipment could be repaired and roads. The road was built within a tunnel started when the 180 Tunnelling Company of the Royal Engineers was created in 1940. The following year the 180 Company was joined by the 170 and 178 Companies.

== The road tunnel ==
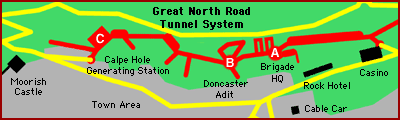
Map A Brigade Headquarters B Doncaster Adit C Calpe Hole Generating Station. North is to the left

The tunnel starts at Maida Vale behind the old Casino at Europa Road and travels north behind the Rock Hotel to Brigade Headquarters and Doncaster Adit. At this point the road forks into several other minor tunnels dug to house kitchens and an ammunition magazine. The entrance to Wilson's Cave is also located here having been discovered while carrying out blasting the rock during the magazine's construction.

The 60 feet (18 m) wide road continues north where it joins the Raglan Battery Shelter. The tunnel would allow military lorries to travel within the Rock. The Great North Road ends at the now abandoned Calpe Hole Generating station; however, the tunnel system continues all the way to the north face of Gibraltar where the World War II tunnels join the Galleries dug out during the latter part of the 18th century, now known as the Great Siege Tunnels. With the addition of Fosse Way in 1944 it was also possible to travel from the tunnel system within the Northern Defences down the complete length of the Rock to emerge on the southeast side of Gibraltar.

After 1941 much of the spoil from mining was used for land reclamation into the Bay of Gibraltar to extend the runway of what is now Gibraltar International Airport to 1,550 yards (1,420 m) long and later to 1,800 yards (1,600 m) in length with a width of 150 yards (140 m). Tunnelling created about 7,500 tons of spoil a day and the surplus was used for other land reclamation projects. The runway was required in order to carry out Operation Torch, the allied attack on French North Africa, from Gibraltar. In November 1942, U.S. General Dwight D. Eisenhower set up his headquarters within the Admiralty Tunnel to plan the Allied invasion of North Africa which would lead with the help of Montgomery's 8th Army to capturing the whole of North Africa.

=== After World War II ===
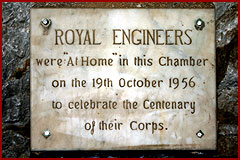
The 1956 plaque commemorating the Royal Engineers centenary dinner at the tunnel

In 1956 a dinner was served within one of the Great North Road's large side chambers to celebrate the centenary of the formation of the Royal Engineers, because the Royal Engineers can trace their history back to the Soldier Artificer Company which was formed on the Rock to dig Gibraltar’s first tunnels during its Great Siege.

Today the tunnel system remains Ministry of Defence property and they are used to train troops for subterranean work. Guided tours can be arranged to view the remains of the World War II installations such as the kitchens, Nissen huts, the abandoned generating station and anti-submarine nets which would have been used to close off Gibraltar Harbour to protect the Allied ships berthed there. The approximately two-hour tour normally starts at Maida Vale, at an entrance behind the old casino on Europa Road, and proceeds through several large chambers visiting Brigade Headquarters and continues for almost 1 mile (1.6 km) arriving at the Calpe Hole Generating Station.
