= The Rock Hotel =

Historic hotel in Gibraltar

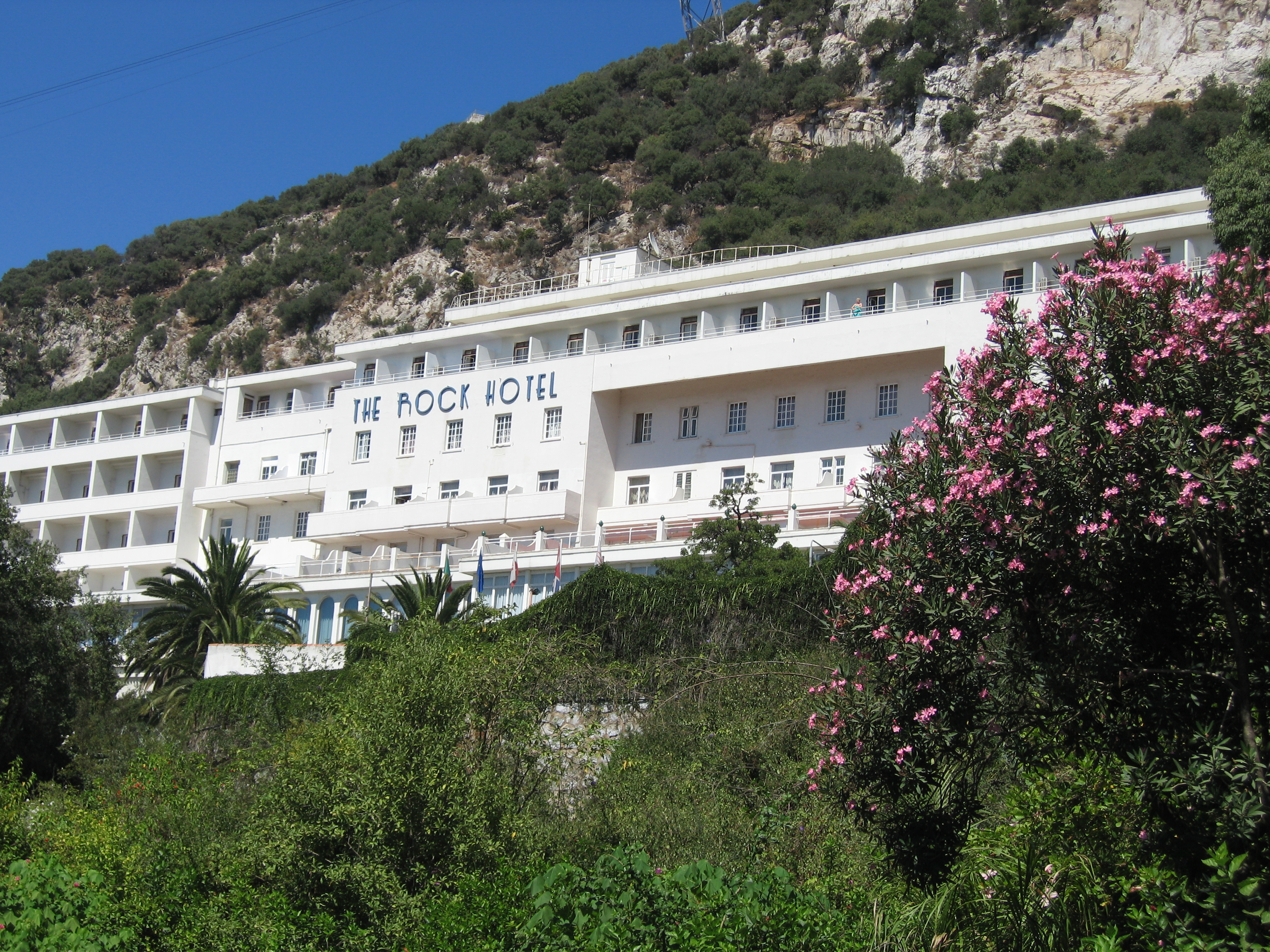
- View of The Rock Hotel from the Gibraltar Botanic Gardens

- Location within Gibraltar

General information
- Location: Gibraltar, 3 Europa Road
- Coordinates: 36°7′55″N 5°21′0″W
- Opening: 1932
- Operator: Bland Group

Technical details
- Floor count: 5

Other information
- Number of rooms: 104
- Parking: Limited

Website
- www.rockhotelgibraltar.com

The Rock Hotel, also known as Rock Hotel, is a historic hotel in the British Overseas Territory of Gibraltar. It has been described as "one of the Mediterranean's most famous hotels," and as "an institution in Gibraltar and the Mediterranean." Built in 1932 by John Crichton-Stuart, 4th Marquess of Bute, the hotel is set in a 3.6-hectare (8.9-acre) landscaped garden and contains 104 rooms. It is located in a large white Art Deco building along Europa Road, overlooking the Gibraltar Botanic Gardens.

== History ==
=== Early years ===
The Rock Hotel was built by John Crichton-Stuart, 4th Marquess of Bute, and began operation in 1932. In the years after it opened, the hotel was managed by Rudolph Richard and earned a reputation as one of the finest hotels in Europe.

During the 1930s and '40s, the hotel provided visitors with a first-hand perspective on the area's military activities. During the Second Italo-Abyssinian War, visitors could watch as Britain's Royal Navy engaged in manoeuvres off the coast of Gibraltar. American journalist Westbrook Pegler stayed at the hotel and took movies from his balcony of the British fleet engaged in exercises. In November 1935, Pegler reported that the hotel's management instructed guests to leave the full-length glass doors open while a new gun on HMS Hood, the largest warship afloat at the time, was tested. He noted that the hotel's balconies "afford a fine view of the pageant of peace" and described "a mighty thump that popped eardrums and rattled glasses on the bathroom shelf" of his room at the Rock Hotel.

In July 1936, the hotel sustained minor damage during the Spanish Civil War. A shell from a Spanish warship attempting to shoot down a rebel aircraft exploded over the city, causing a small landslide in which rocks and fragments struck the hotel's fire escape ladders. Also in 1936, a rebel plane reportedly dropped a bomb that damaged the hotel.

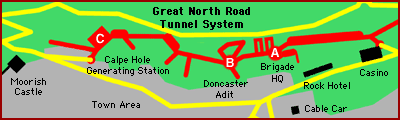
Map of the Great North Road tunnel depicting the Rock Hotel – A Brigade Headquarters B Doncaster Adit C Calpe Hole Generating Station. (North is to the left)

During World War II, military officials stayed at The Rock. Guests dealt with noise from the construction of war tunnels. In September 1941, an American war correspondent described his stay at the hotel: "I dropped off to sleep in a comfortable room at the Rock hotel to the thunderous lullaby of the dynamite blasters. The next morning, after a breakfast of bacon, tomatoes, toast, butter, orange marmalade and coffee – a remarkable breakfast for wartime Europe – I set off on a tour of the passages."

=== Post-World War II ===
Until his death in 1947, the hotel was owned by John Crichton-Stuart, the Marquess of Bute. The hotel had declined by 1950 when B. Vispaly, who had previously worked at the Hôtel Meurice in Paris, was in charge.

In April 1951, the hotel sustained damage in the explosion of the RFA Bedenham, an incident in which a 1,000-ton British munitions ship blew up at the Gibraltar naval base.

The Rock Hotel has hosted numerous internationally renowned celebrities and a number of celebrity weddings. In April 1962, Sarah, the 47-year-old actress daughter of Churchill, was married to Thomas Touchet-Jesson, 23rd Baron Audley, in a civil ceremony at the Rock Hotel. Also in 1962, Sean Connery and Diane Cilento stayed at The Rock Hotel after a marriage ceremony in Gibraltar.

== Management ==
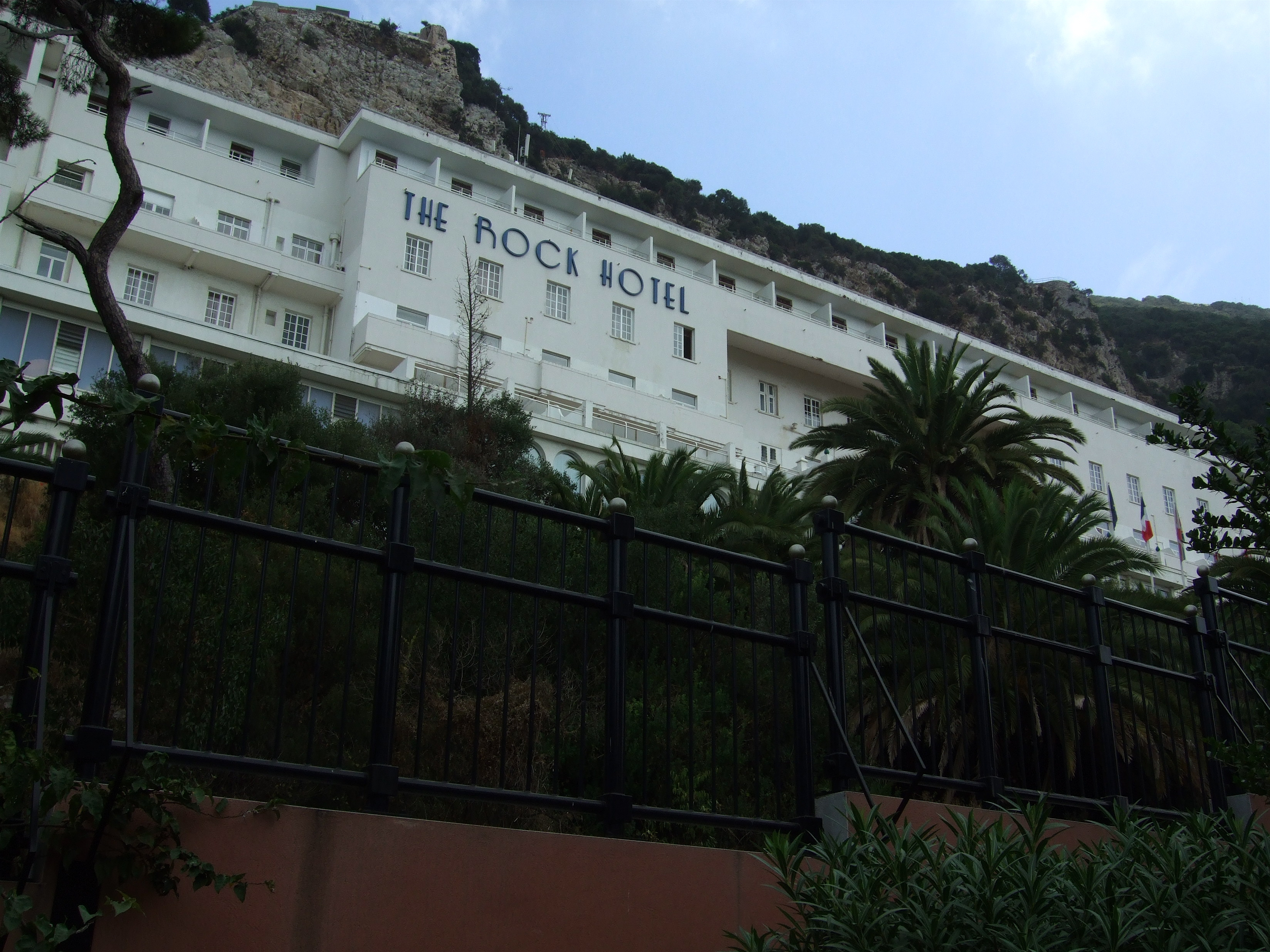
View of the building from the hotel gardens

Since 1959, the hotel has been operated by the Bland Group. The Bland Group was founded in 1810 as a shipping agency and later provided a passenger service and transported supplies for Gibraltar's military garrison. Joseph Gaggero acquired the company in 1891, and it has been run by the Gaggero family since that time.

In 1971 James J. Bossino was promoted to general manager by Joseph Gaggero. He was to become not only the first Gibraltarian Manager but the youngest at 33. During his 23 years at the helm of the Rock Hotel, James Bossino saw the expansion of the hotel with an extra wing built to the north of the property along with two extra floors, two penthouse suites and a conference room. He then led the hotel through the very difficult economic and social siege that was the closed frontier period between 1969 and 1982/84 by successfully steering the institution that was the Rock Hotel. He also recruited, at the time, the very loyal Moroccan workforce. Some of his team continue to work there to this day. He later went on to launch a second major refurbishment in 1987. James Bossino retired from the Rock Hotel in 1994.

In 1997, Stephen Davenport, previously of Wood Hall Country House Hotel, Linton, West Yorkshire, became general manager of The Rock. He launched a £1.2 million refurbishment programme at the hotel soon after arriving.

Stephen Davenport has now retired, followed by Charles Danino, and Louise Peach has taken over.

== Facilities ==
The hotel is set in a 3.6-hectare (8.9-acre) landscaped garden with geraniums and a wisteria-covered terrace. It is decorated in a colonial style and has 97 rooms, including some suites, junior suites and penthouses.

In the 2009 guide book, "Frommer's Seville, Granada and the Best of Andalusia," the author described the hotel's Terrace Restaurant as the "single finest dining room on Gibraltar". According to the hotel's web site, Moorish, Iberian and British styles of cooking predominate at the hotel's restaurants, which are led by head chef Alfred Rodriguez, who has been affiliated with the hotel since 1973.

== Gallery ==
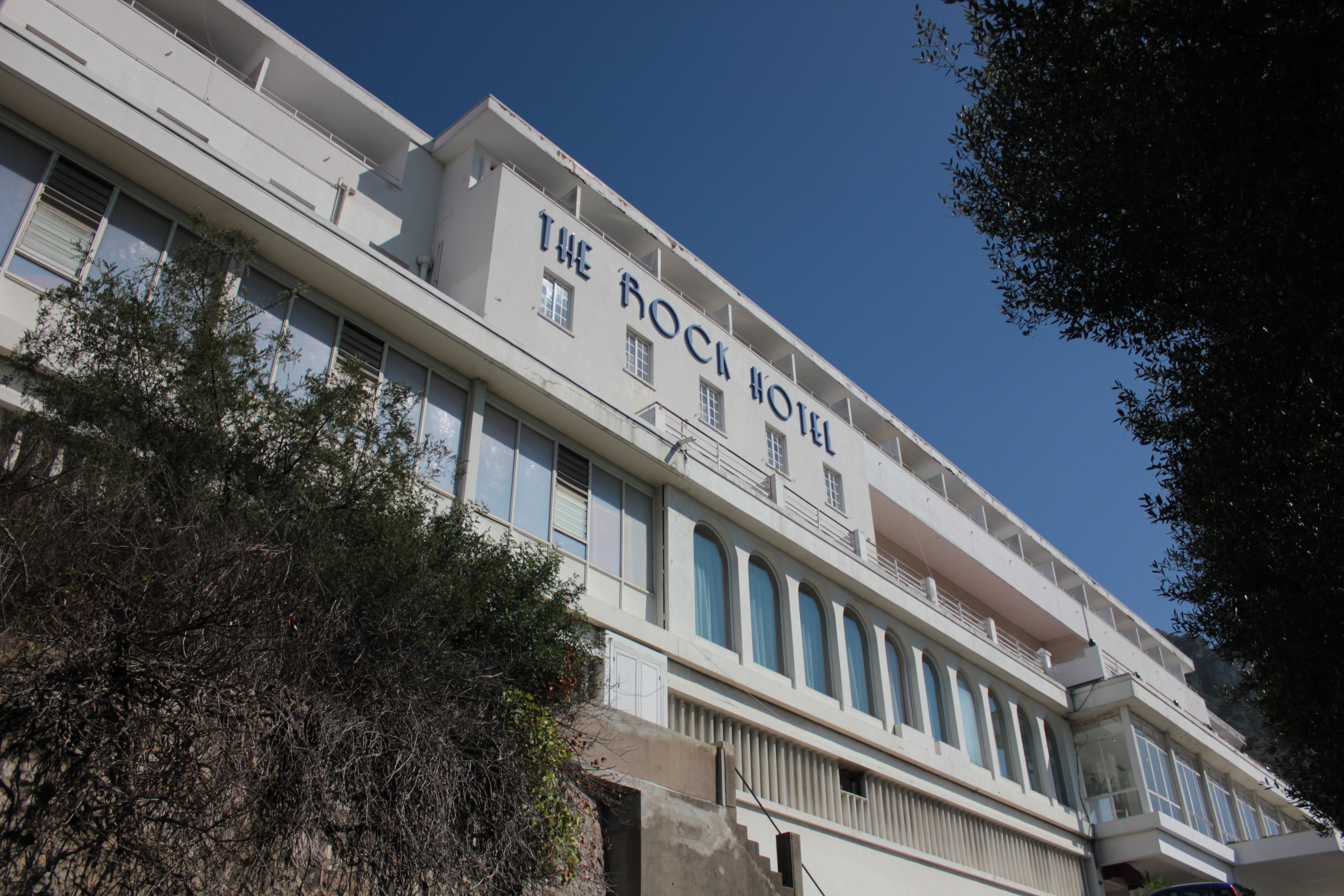

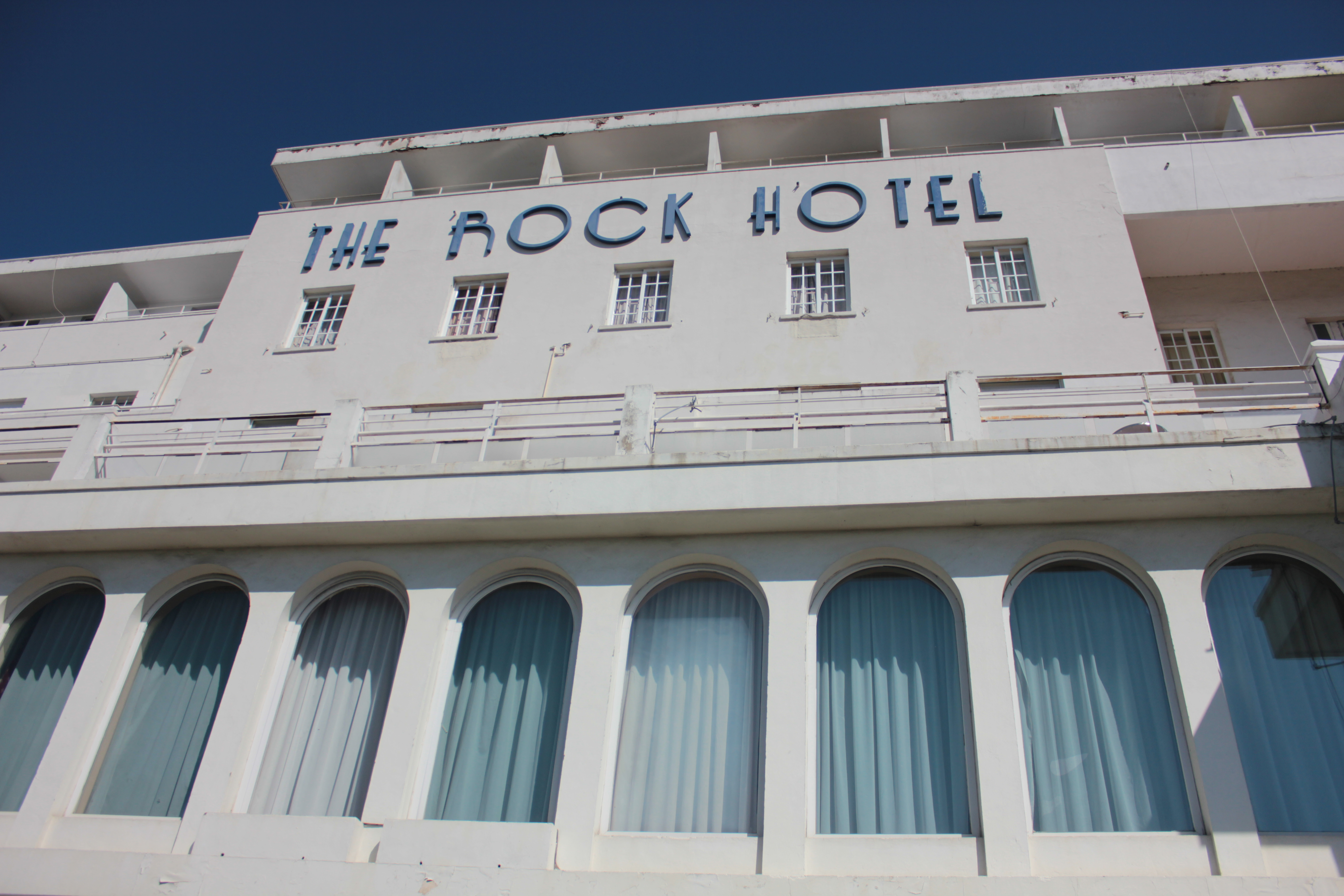

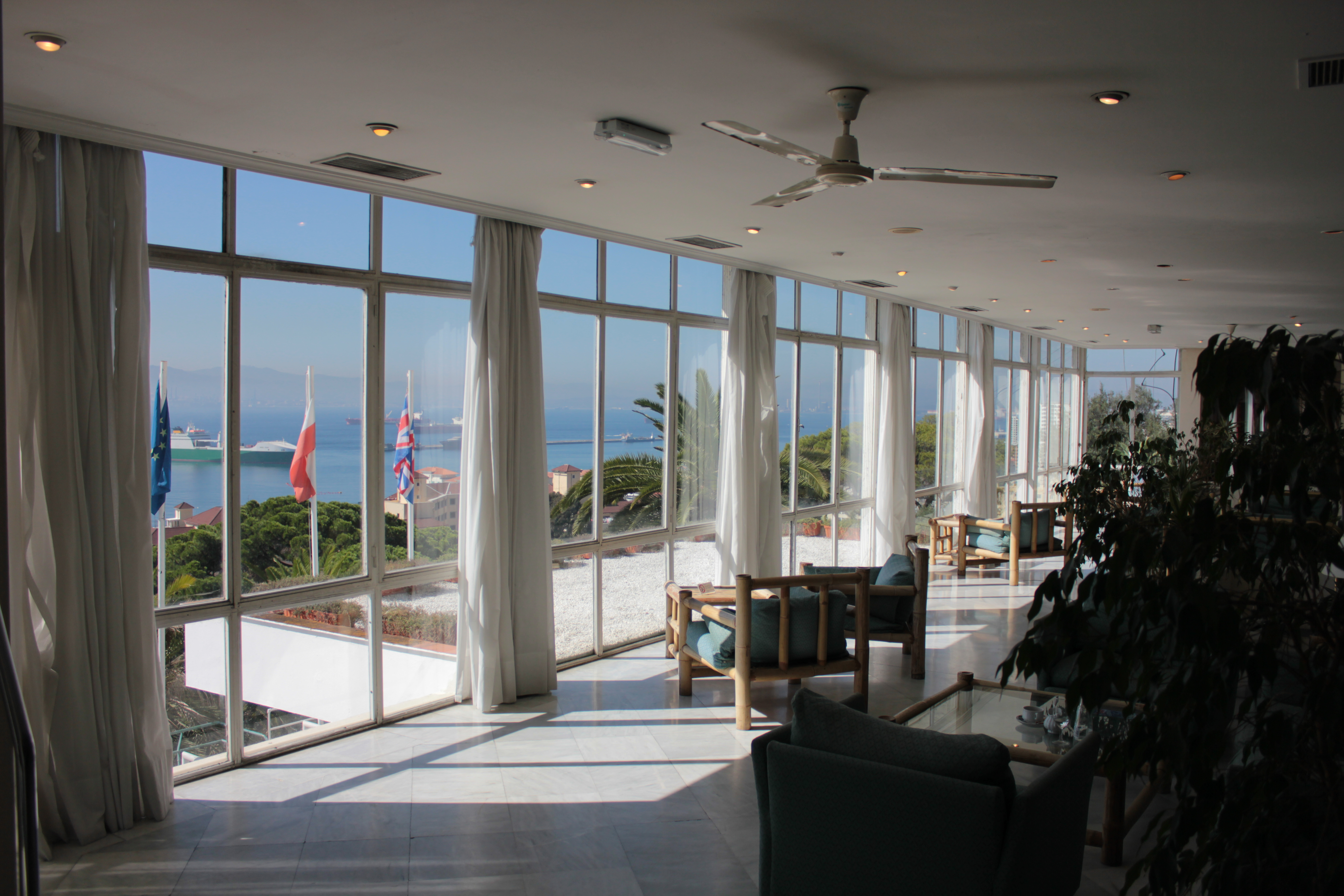

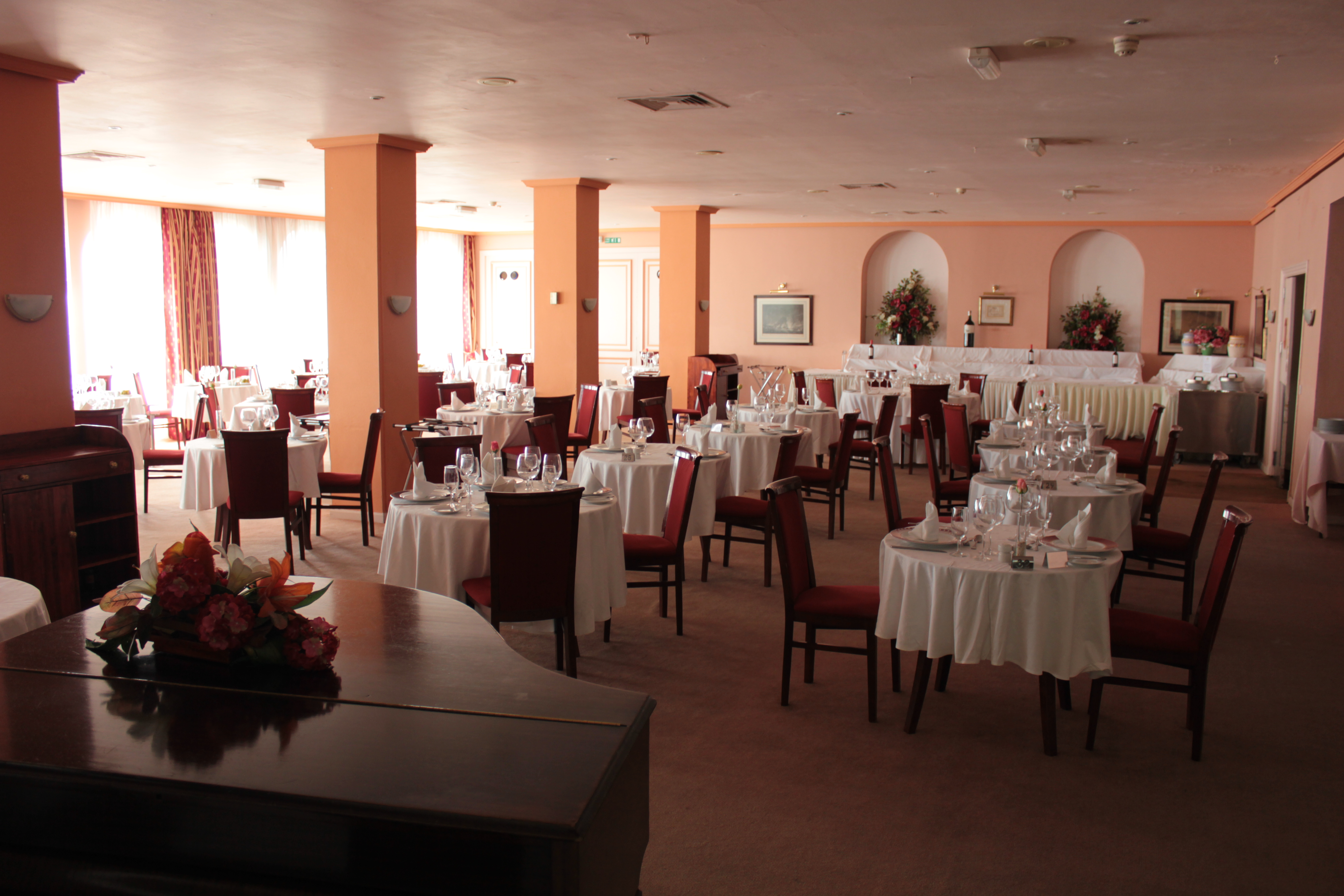

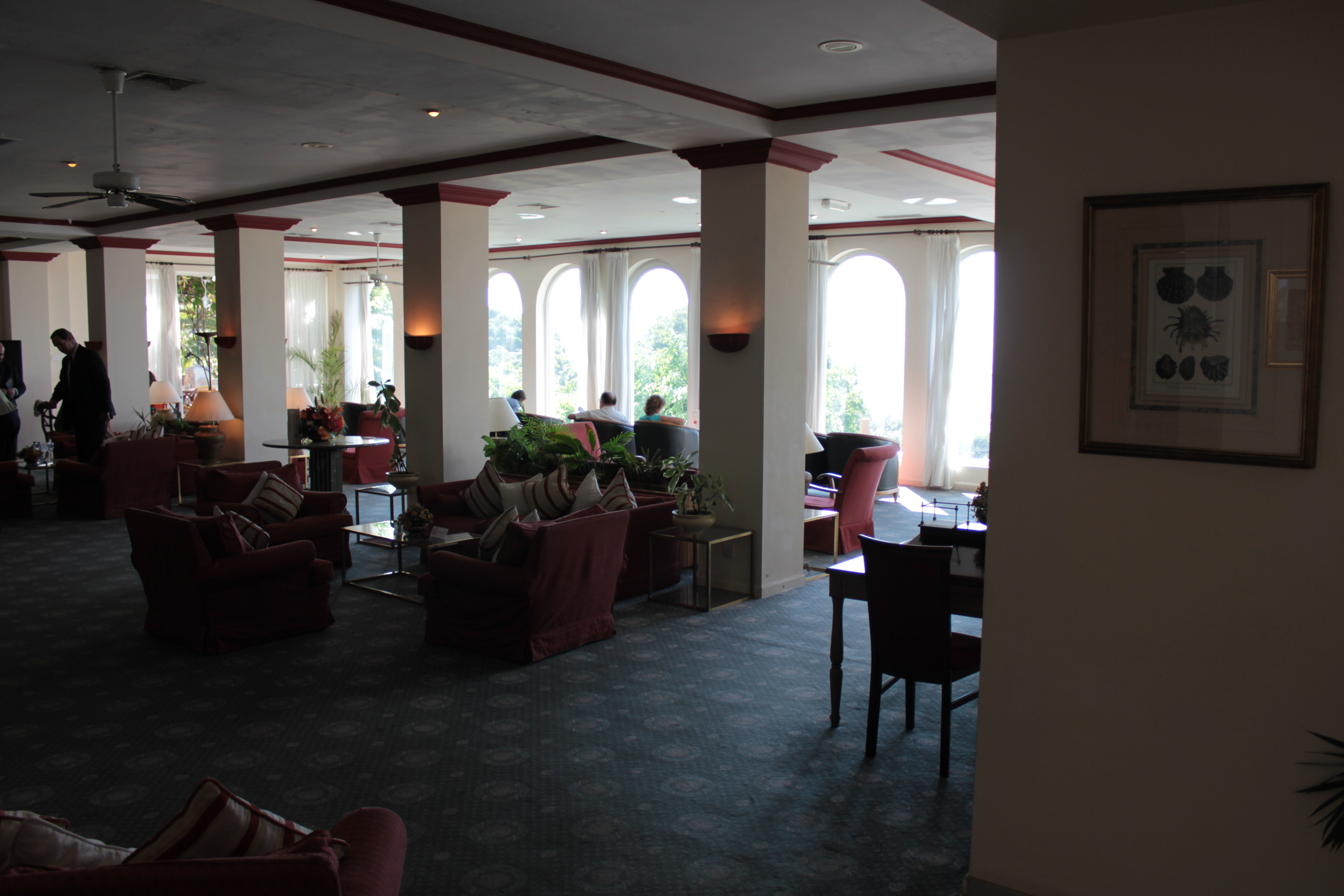

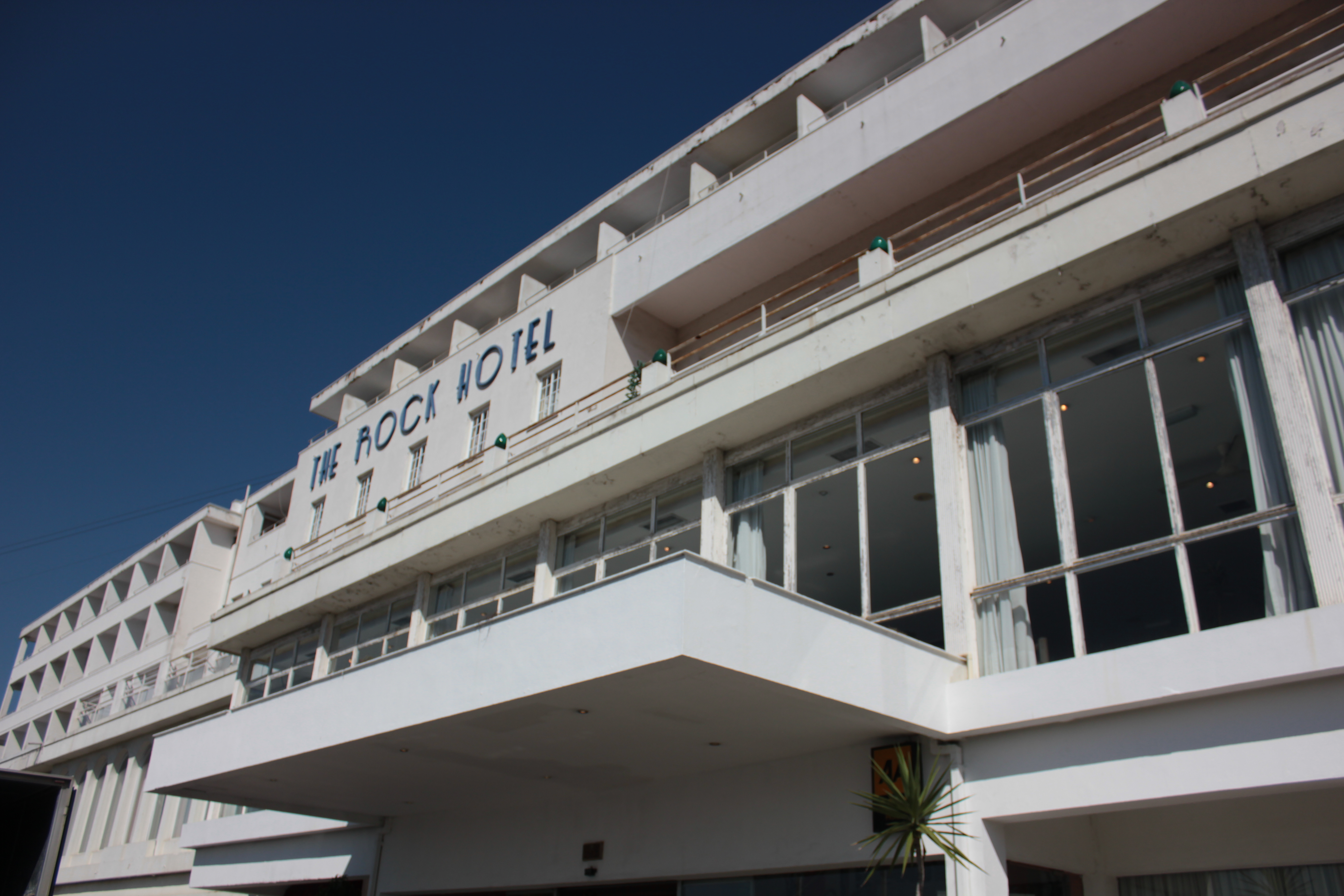

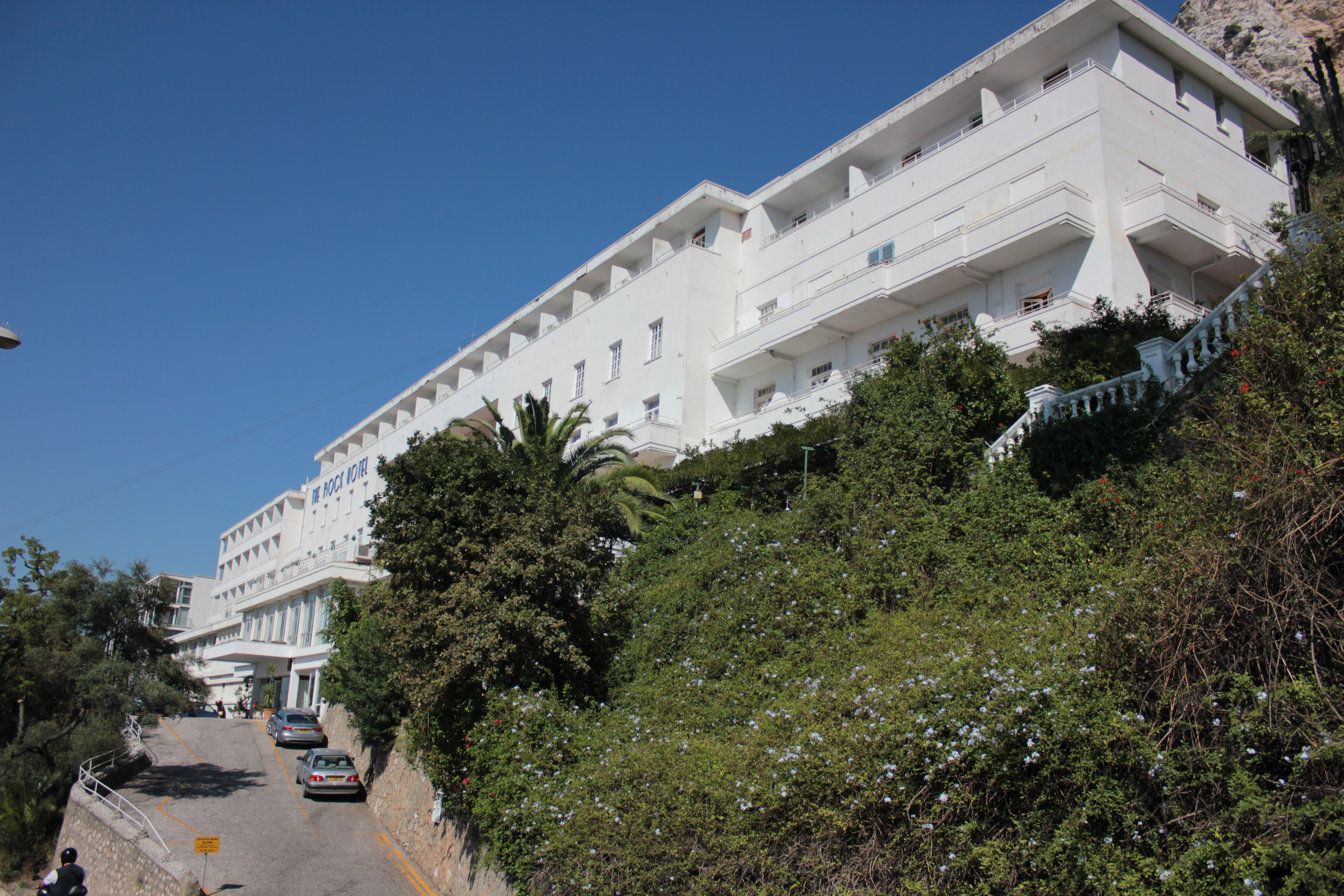

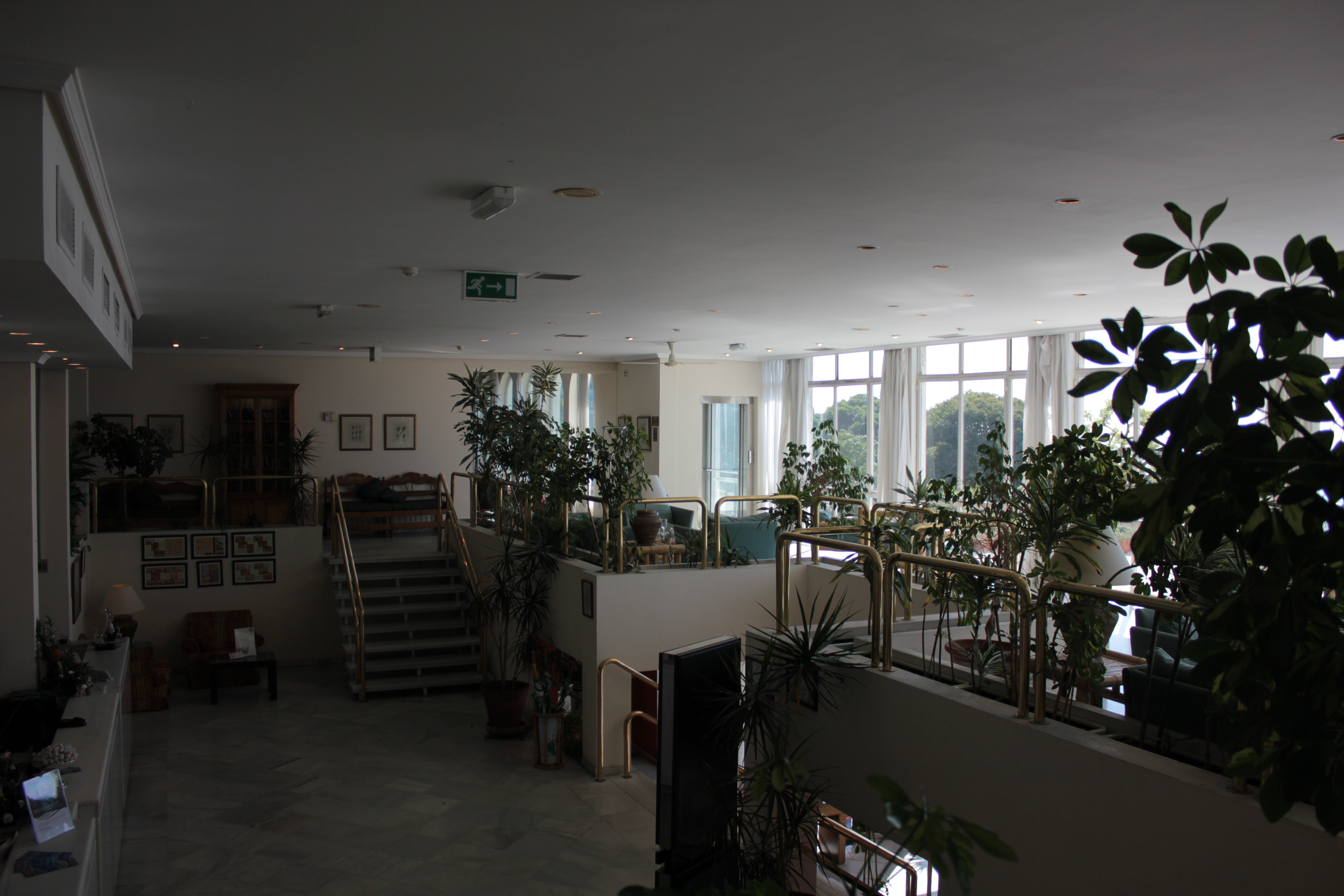

== Notes and references ==
Notes
