= Gibraltar Cable Car =

Aerial tramway

Coordinates: 36°7′58.13″N 5°21′07.39″W

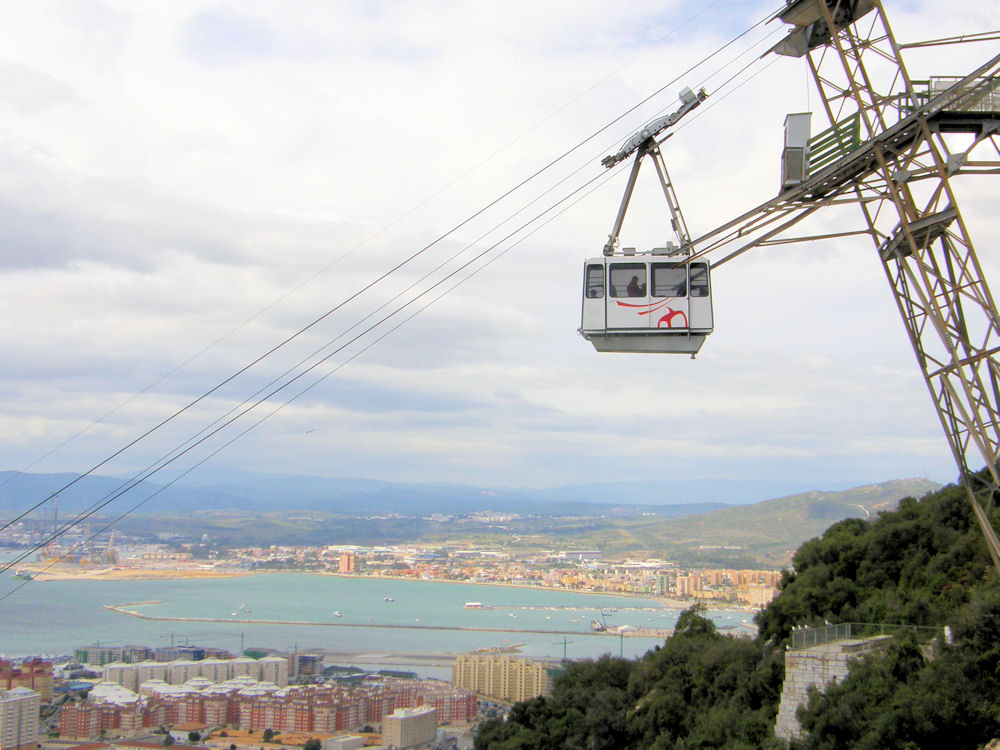
- Interactive map of Gibraltar Cable Car

Overview
- Status: Operational
- Character: Elevated
- Location: Gibraltar, British overseas territory
- Termini: start - Grand Parade in town center (close to the Gibraltar Botanic Gardens) end - the top of the Rock of Gibraltar
- Open: 1966

Technical features
- Aerial lift type: Aerial tramway
- Operating speed: 5 m/s (16.4 ft/s)

Gibraltar Cable Car (Spanish: Teleférico de Gibraltar) is an aerial tramway in Gibraltar. The base station of the cable car is located near the southern end of Main Street, next to Alameda Gardens.

As of November 2025, the cable car is closed for a major reconstruction expected to last two years.

== History ==
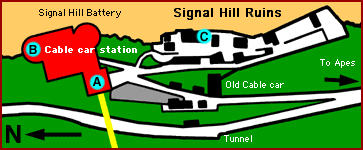
Schematic of buildings on Signal Hill. A West Terrace and B North Terrace of the top Cable Car station. C is the remains of the Signal Station.

The Gibraltar Cable Car was built in 1966 by Swiss cable car experts Von Roll Holding, with the base and summit stations designed by architect Brian Helliwell and atop Signal Hill Battery. The battery was located alongside a Signal Station and was equipped with two 3-inch 30-cwt anti-aircraft guns and a 40-mm Bofors gun during World War II. Remains of an earlier cable station that was used to bring supplies (or a brave man) up to the top of signal hill via a rope are still evident. Besides the remains of earlier military buildings there is also a short tunnel that runs east to west under the station.

The last extensive renovation of the cable car took place in 1986 when the cable cars were replaced with the current day cabins. In 2007 the Top Station was refurbished and replaced with the current facilities including the Calpe Suite which is registered to conduct weddings.

== Operation ==
From the base station, the cable car travels up the Rock of Gibraltar to the Ape's Den midway up the Rock, and then to the top of the Rock. Despite being called "top of the Rock", it is actually the second highest peak of the Rock at 412 metres (1,352 ft) above sea level. There are 673 metres (2,208 ft) between the two stations and the cars can take an attendant and 30 people up or down the cables. The cars travel between the three towers and the journey takes approximately six minutes at a speed of 5 m/s (16.4 ft/s; 18.0 km/h; 11.2 mph).

During the journey, audio tour guides describe historical background on the sights of Gibraltar. At the top is a restaurant, café, toilet facilities, and terraces which offer views across the Strait of Gibraltar to Morocco, the Bay of Gibraltar towards Algeciras, and up the east coast towards Marbella. Bus number 2, 3 and 4 stop close by to the base station. Parking is available in Grand Parade next to the base station.

== Gallery ==
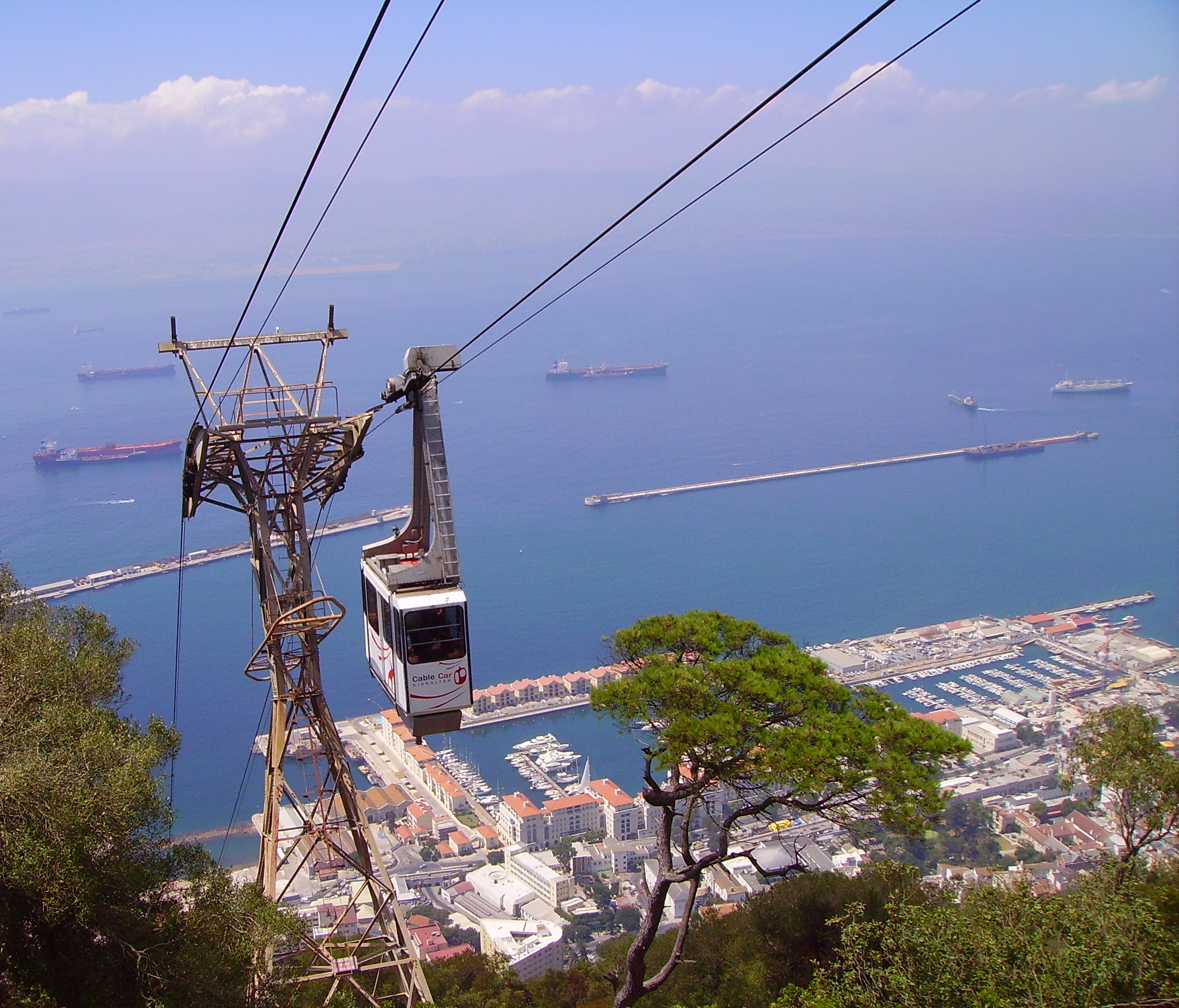
Gondola of Gibraltar Cable Car on upper elevation

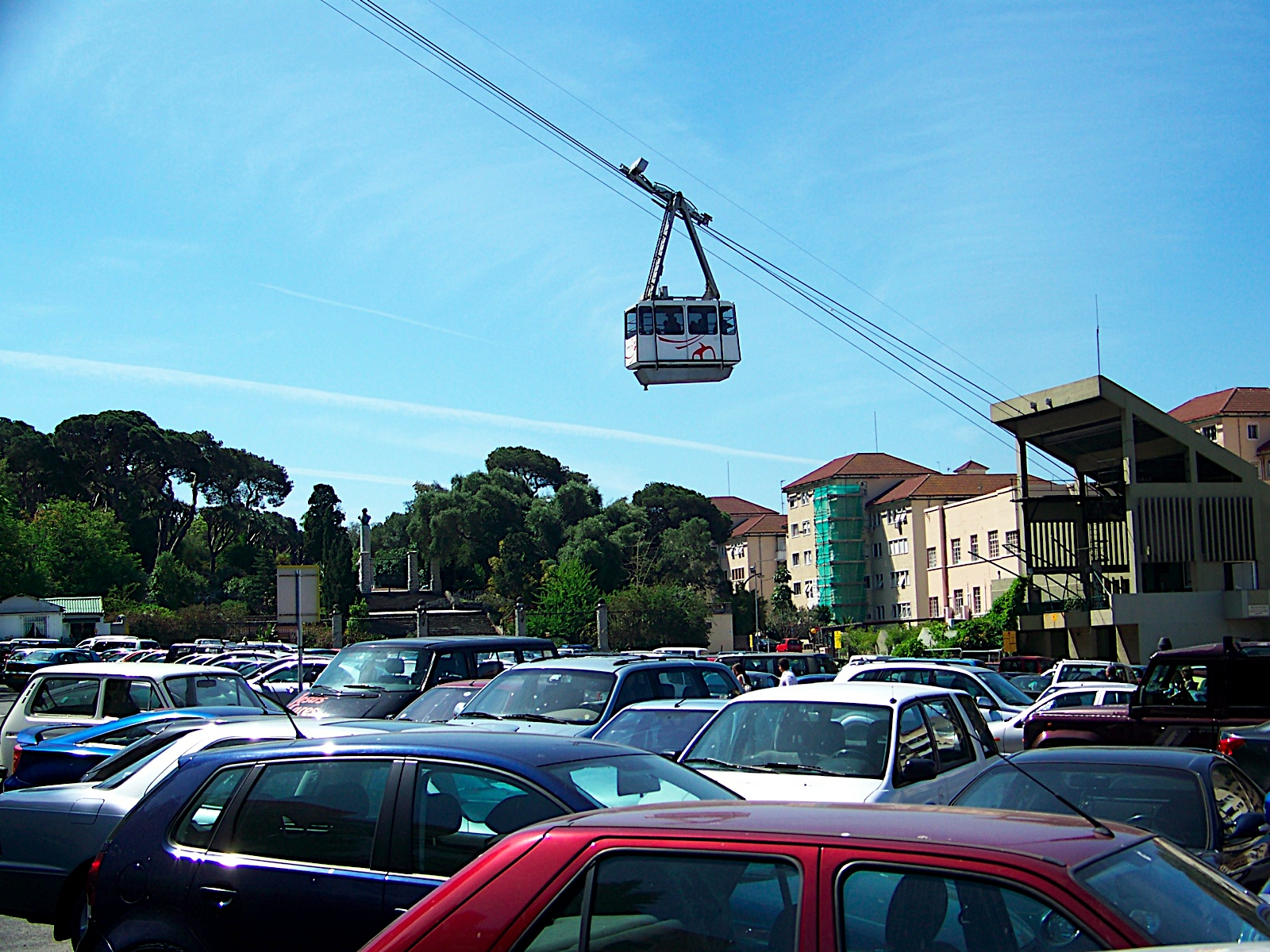
Gondola of Gibraltar Cable Car on down elevation

Mini footage
