= Calpe Hole Generating station =

Electrical power station in Gibraltar

Coordinates: 36°08′39″N 5°20′56″W

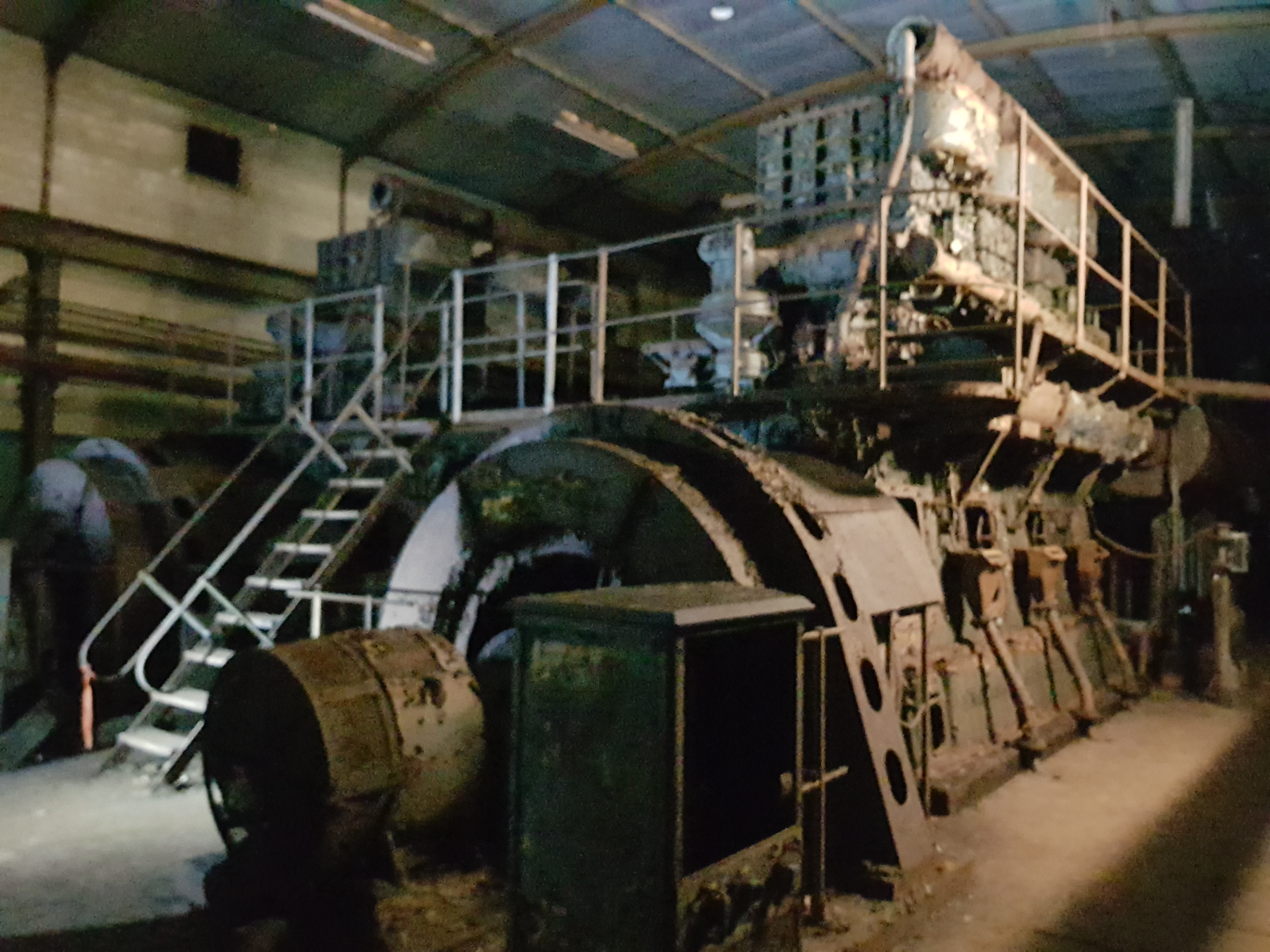
- Country: Gibraltar
- Location: Gibraltar
- Status: abandoned
- Owner: Government of Gibraltar
- Operator: Government of Gibraltar

External links
- Commons: Related media on Commons

The Calpe Hole Generating station is an abandoned power station located in the rock of Gibraltar, accessed via the Great North Road, Gibraltar. The turbines were made by Ruston (engine builder) which were taken over by English Electric in the early 20th century. The roof in the station was made by Herbert Morris Ltd from Loughborough.
