= Wilson's Cave =

Cave in the British Overseas Territory of Gibraltar

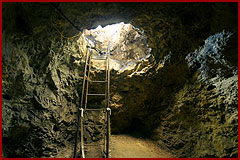
- Access to Wilson's Cave via a small ladder within the tunnel system inside the Rock of Gibraltar
- Interactive map of Wilson's Cave
- Location: Gibraltar
- Coordinates: 36°08′09″N 5°21′10″W
- Discovery: World War II
- Geology: Limestone
- Entrances: 1
- Lighting: No

Wilson's Cave (Note: Another cave in Gibraltar formerly named Wilson's Cave has been renamed Gorham's Cave. This cave opens off Governor's Beach, and is a site of major archaeological significance.) is a cave in the British Overseas Territory of Gibraltar.

== Location ==
A 1944 map of the Batteries and underground tunnels of Gibraltar by Colonel Joseph Marie Emile "Pop" Gareze shows Wilson's Cave near the Magazine Ramp of Green Lane Magazine, to the north of Flat Bastion Hospital. It is named after Major W.H. Wilson, who commanded a company of the Royal Engineers.

== History ==
Tito Vallejo states that the cave was discovered when Magazine Ramp was being excavated during World War II. A section of the ramp's tunnel collapsed and revealed a natural cavity in the limestone. The miners were carrying out extensive tunnelling within the Rock to develop a structure to absorb a possible blast (known as a blast trap) from an exploding magazine when part of the tunnel caved into the natural cavity. The magazine was served from Doncaster Adit off the Great North Road which supplied vehicular access to the outside.

== Appearance ==
In November 1944 the Illustrated London News reported that British Sappers had discovered a new cave, named "Wilson's Cave" after the commander of the tunneling party that found it. The cave was about 60 feet (18 m) long and had an average height of about 30 feet (9.1 m). It contained attractive stalagmites and stalactites with diameters ranging from under 1 inch (25 mm) to over 1 foot (0.30 m). A steep "glacier" of limestone flowed from one end of the cave. A formation in the roof resembled a petrified curtain.

== See also ==
- List of caves in Gibraltar

== Sources ==
- "British Sappers Discover a New Cave at Gibraltar Dusring Extensions of the Tunnelling System", Illustrated London News, William Little, 11 November 1944
- Chipulina, Neville (2019), The 200 Caves of Gibraltar - Part 13
- Rose, Ted (December 1997), "Captain G B Alexander's 1945-1848 Studies on the Geology of Gibraltar" (PDF), Royal Engineers Journal (letter), vol. 111, no. 3
- Vallejo, Tito, The Gibraltar Tunnels
