= Signal Hill Battery, Gibraltar =

Artillery battery in Gibraltar

Signal Hill Battery
- Part of Fortifications of Gibraltar
- Gibraltar
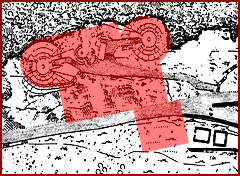
- Old Ordnance Survey map depicting Signal Hill Battery with superimposed red area showing the footprint of the Gibraltar Cable Car top station

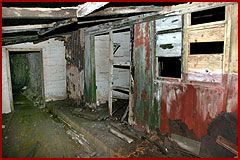
- Remains of the Nissen hut within the battery's tunnel

Site information
- Type: Artillery battery
- Owner: Government of Gibraltar
- Condition: Built upon

Location
- Location in Gibraltar
- Coordinates: 36.134307°N 5.345732°W

Site history
- Built: 1727

Signal Hill Battery or Signal Battery was an artillery battery in the British Overseas Territory of Gibraltar. The battery was mounted high on the rock. Little remains today as the Gibraltar Cable Car top station was built on the site of the old battery.

== History ==
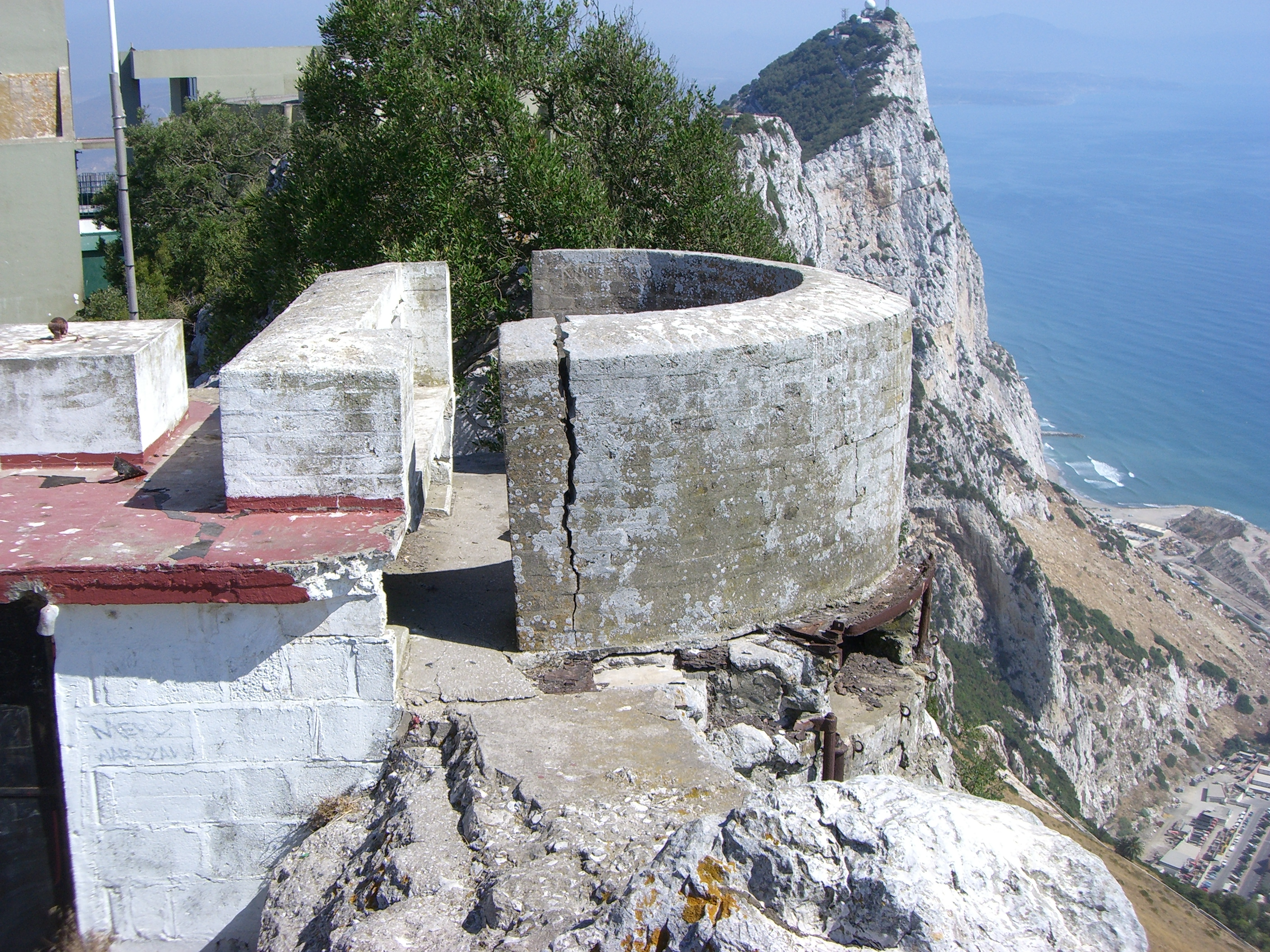
Remains of the Signal Station just south of Signal Hill Battery

The top of the Rock of Gibraltar is a natural site for a signal station and the 1,200 feet (370 m) high Signal Hill has had a Signal Station since at least 1727. In 1773 it had its first 6-pounder gun installed. The height above sea level gave the gun extra range and it could also fire in any direction. However, in Gibraltar height can be a disadvantage as the levanter cloud can interfere with the gunners view of targets.

By 1892 the gun had been updated to a BL 6 inch QF gun mounted on a Vavasseur mounting. Seven years later a second gun was added and after two more years there were four 6 inch guns and two QF 12 pounder 12 cwt gun. The latter two had depression mountings allowing them to be fired down the side of the Rock but they were removed by 1906.

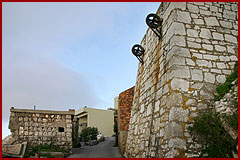
Remains of old cable car at Signal Station.

During World War II the Rock was a target for air raids and two 3 inch 30 cwt anti-aircraft guns were mounted on the hill together with a Bofors 40 mm gun.

The battery was later removed and built over by the Gibraltar Cable Car top station, however there are remains of an earlier cable station that was used to bring supplies (or a brave man) up to the top of Signal Hill. Besides the remains of earlier military buildings there is also a short tunnel that runs east to west.

== The tunnel ==
Under the battery is a tunnel (called Bellman's Cave) which still (2013) contains the remains of accommodation that was installed for the gunners of the battery. The tunnel which runs from east to west contains a hollowed out interior which is six by twelve metres. Within this space are the remains of a Nissen hut. The small tunnel also contains cooking and other abandoned facilities.
