= Europa Road =

Road in Gibraltar

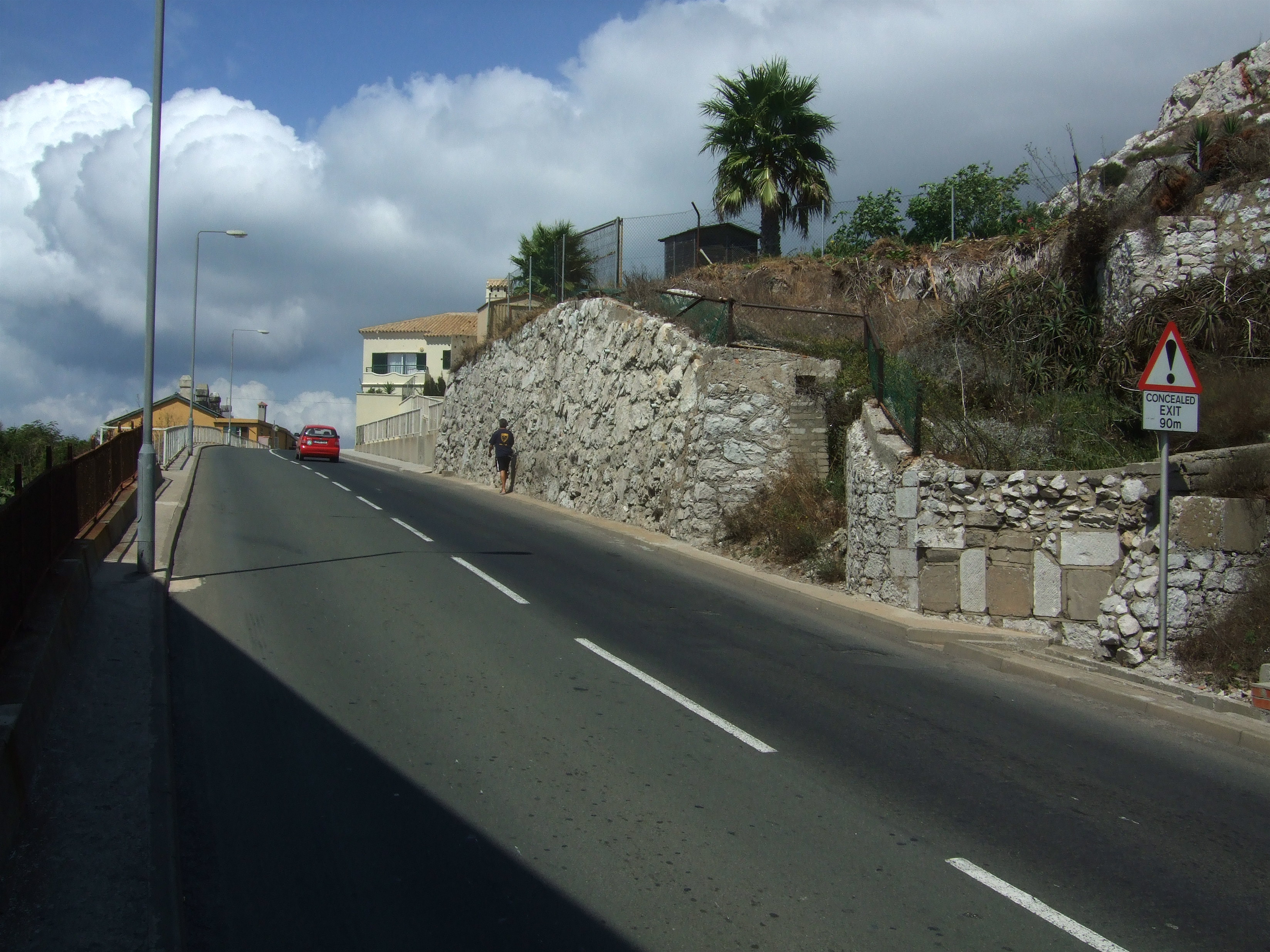
- Southernmost section of Europa Road looking northwest.
- Length: 2.9 km (1.8 mi)
- Location: Gibraltar
- Coordinates: 36.126872°N 5.349739°W

Europa Road is a major road in the British Overseas Territory of Gibraltar. It begins near Trafalgar Cemetery and Trafalgar Road and connects the centre with the southern tip of the territory at Europa Point. Along its way the road passes The Rock Hotel, Gibraltar Botanic Gardens, and the Ibrahim-al-Ibrahim Mosque.

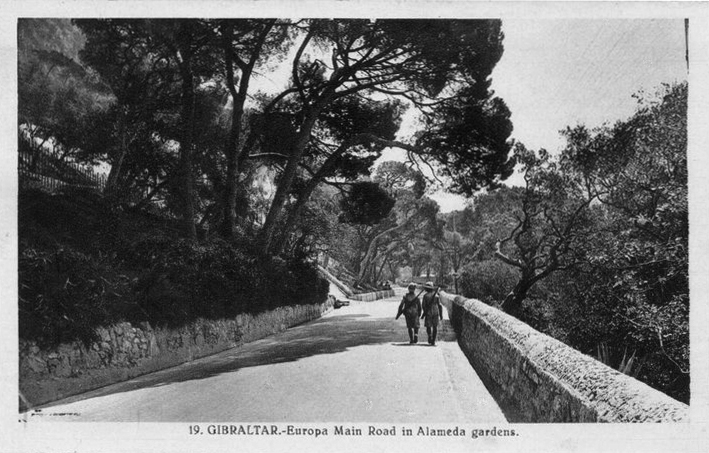
Old postcard depicting the section of Europa Road, between The Rock Hotel and Gibraltar Botanic Gardens.

== Maintenance and construction ==
The Europa Road is located in Gibraltar and no precise date of its construction can not be found; however, the Europa Road was incorporated in the Immaculate Conception Institute in 1872. The construction of the road is known to be mock limestone or concrete at some points along the Europa Road. With the road stretching for 1.8 miles and the age of the Europa Road, the construction in some parts are bound to be different depending on what part of the road is being examined. At some of the points along the Europa Road, there are concrete bound walls that conceal original limestone ashlar block work that has not been visible for many generations. Maintenance is performed on the Europa Road, showing that the road is constructed using layers of building material and was not made during one single application. The Europa Road in Gibraltar is maintained by and supervised by Her Majesty's Government of Gibraltar. Similar to most territories with public roads, if there is any work that needs to be done on the road, the local government is responsible for that work; furthermore, if there is any construction adjacent to or involving the Europa Road, the local government will be involved in the permitting process as well.

== Trade ==
The Europa Road is considered to be the main artery serving the South District in Gibraltar. Through the use of the Europa Road, easy access is gained to a number of local businesses and commerce is made possible. Through the incorporation of the Europa Road, Gibraltar was provided with key assets such as commerce and scientific education. The Europa Road was built to provide a main road and to encourage growth and develop infrastructure throughout Gibraltar. For Gibraltar, the Europa Road provides a route for both trade and information. Throughout history Gibraltar has been positioned well for trading purposes. Knowing this, the government of Gibraltar has sought to establish themselves as a trading stronghold. This is done through the development of roads, such as the Europa Road, providing access near the ports and throughout most of Gibraltar. In times of war and blockades, Gibraltar would become a rallying point, allowing countries to conduct trade throughout Europe, and this was aided by the Europa Road and the infrastructure it gave to Gibraltar. Without the critical infrastructure that the Europa Road provides, trade in Gibraltar both internationally and nationally would suffer.

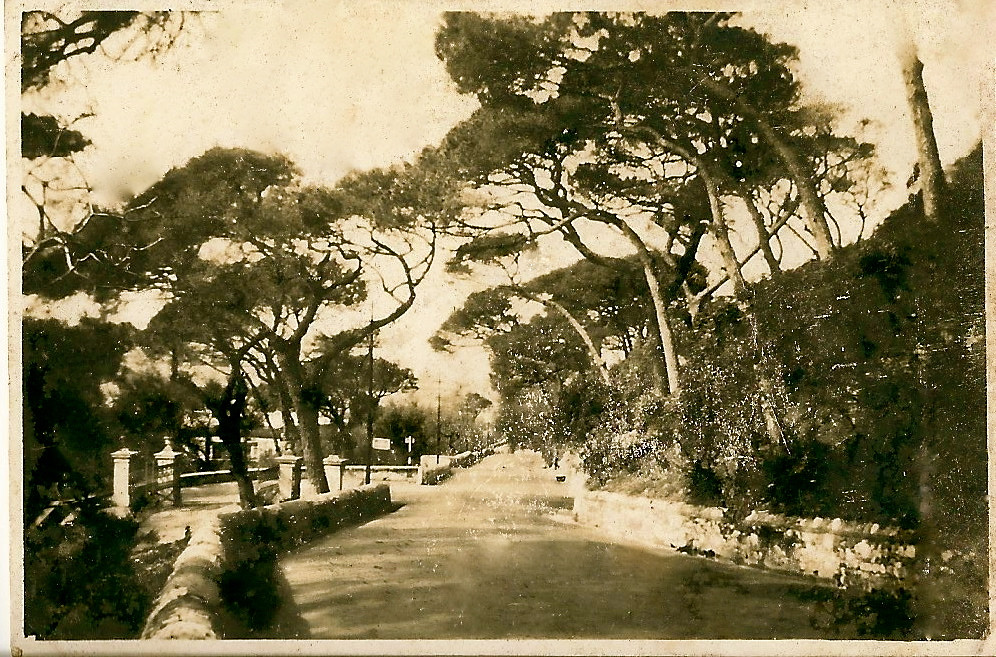
Europa Road from 1945

== Scientific experiments ==
There has been a scientific experiment performed on the sewers of the Europa Road to discover what conditions some bacteria will develop in the sewers and possibly end up in the air ventilation systems in Gibraltar.
