= Alameda Wildlife Conservation Park =

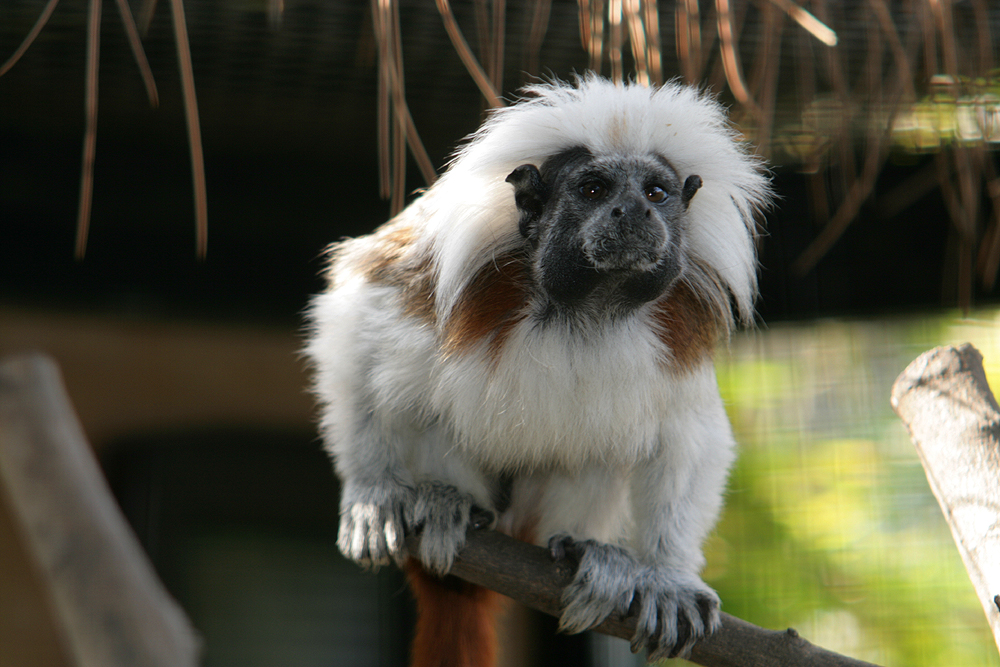
- One of six featured cotton-topped tamarins
- Interactive map of Alameda Wildlife Conservation Park
- 36.130576°N 5.350263°W
- Date opened: 2002
- Location: Gibraltar
- No. of animals: 128
- No. of species: 36
- Website: www.awcp.gi

The Alameda Wildlife Conservation Park (AWCP) is a small wildlife park situated in the Botanic Gardens in Gibraltar.

== History ==
The Alameda Wildlife Conservation Park began in 1994 as a collection of parrots, tortoises and monkeys all confiscated from illegal traders who were passing through Gibraltar. The local Customs authorities handed these animals to the Gibraltar Ornithological and Natural History Society (GONHS).

In 1996 the Alameda Miniature Golf Course was cleared after many years of neglect and modified into a small conservation park, again entirely through volunteer help.

== Today ==
Although the main purpose of the park was to house confiscated animals, it became apparent that, if finished properly, it could also be open to the public to make people aware not only about illegal animal trade, but also about local wildlife conservation. The park has also become important for the care of native species that are considered for future re-introduction to the Upper Rock Nature Reserve, such as the red fox, the raven and the Barbary partridge.

The park has become an important educational resource for local schools, helping to raise awareness of not only the rich local biodiversity but also of wider conservation issues.

== Entrance information ==
The park is open all year except Good Friday, National Day (10 September) and Christmas Day. Entrance fees are used to cover general maintenance, food bills and veterinarian expenses.

== Species in the park ==
Reptiles

- Green iguana
- Spur-thighed tortoise
- Terrapin
- Hermann's tortoise
- Snapping turtle
- Chinese water dragon

Mammals

- Prairie dog
- Barbary macaque
- Pig-tailed macaque
- Long tailed macaque
- Cotton-topped tamarin
- Prevost's squirrel
- Egyptian fruit bat
- Vietnamese potbelly pig
- Asian small-clawed otter
- Rabbit
- Masked dormice

Birds

- Grey parrot
- Patagonian conure
- Yellow fronted amazon
- Orange-winged amazon
- Red lory
- Black lory
- Monk parakeet
- Mitred conure
- Sulphur-crested cockatoo
- Raven
- Senegal parrot
- Free Indian peafowl

== Events ==
The park organizes two open days each year, in May and in October. Others events are offered by the Alameda Wildlife Conservation Park.

== See also ==
- Gibraltar Botanic Gardens
- List of mammals of Gibraltar
- List of birds of Gibraltar
- List of reptiles and amphibians in Gibraltar
