= Rock of Gibraltar =

Monolithic limestone promontory located in the British overseas territory of Gibraltar

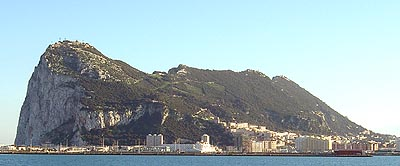
- Western face of the Rock of Gibraltar, in April 2006

Highest point
- Elevation: 426 m (1,398 ft)
- Prominence: 423 m (1,388 ft)
- Coordinates: 36°07′28.1″N 05°20′35.2″W

Geography
- Location of the Rock of Gibraltar's summit
- Location: Gibraltar
- Parent range: Betic Cordillera

Geology
- Rock age: Jurassic

Climbing
- Easiest route: Gibraltar Cable Car, Road, Hike

The Rock of Gibraltar is a monolithic limestone mountain 426 m (1,398 ft) high dominating the western entrance to the Mediterranean Sea at the Strait of Gibraltar. It is situated near the end of a narrow 9-kilometre-long (5.6 mi) promontory stretching due south into the Mediterranean Sea and is located within the British territory of Gibraltar. The rock is 27 km northeast of Tarifa, Spain, the southwestern tip of Europe on the Iberian Peninsula. The rock serves as a fortress and contains a labyrinthine network of man-made tunnels known as the Tunnels of Gibraltar. Most of the Rock's upper area comprises a nature reserve which is home to about 300 Barbary macaques. It is a major tourist attraction.

The Rock of Gibraltar, the northern of the two historic Pillars of Hercules, was known to the Romans as Mons Calpe ("Mount Calpe"); the southern Pillar of Hercules on the African side of the Strait of Gibraltar was known as Mons Abila, with a modern name of either Monte Hacho or Jebel Musa. According to an ancient legend fostered by the Greeks and the Phoenicians and later adopted by the Romans, the two pillars marked the western limit of the known world.

== Geology ==
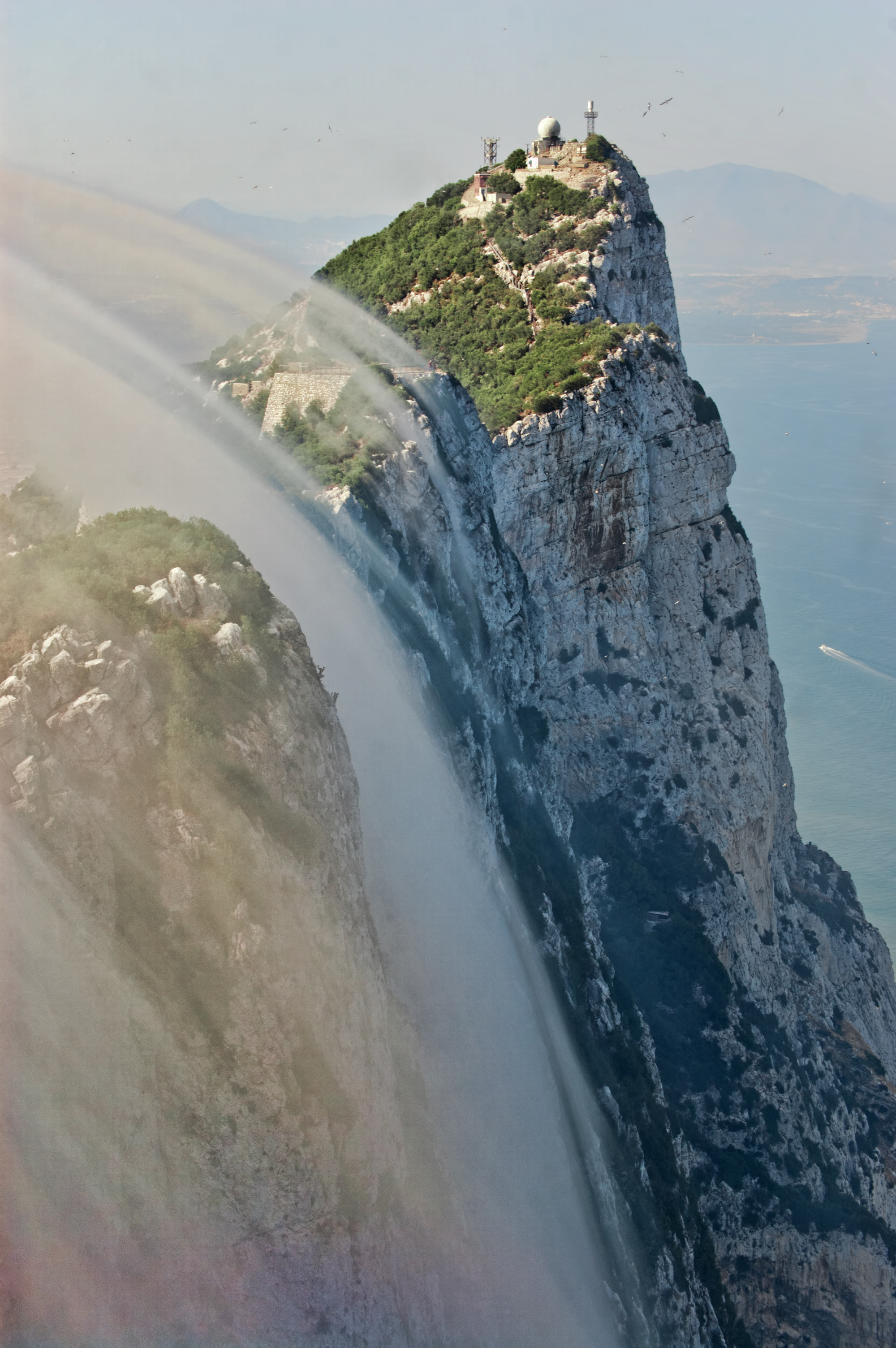
Levant cloud forming against the eastern cliffs of the Rock of Gibraltar

The Rock of Gibraltar is a monolithic promontory. The Main Ridge has a sharp crest with peaks over 400 metres (1,300 ft) above sea level, formed by Early Jurassic limestones and dolomites. It is a deeply eroded and highly faulted limb of an overturned fold. The sedimentary strata composing the Rock of Gibraltar are overturned, with the oldest strata overlying the youngest strata. These strata are the Catalan Bay Shale Formation (youngest), Gibraltar Limestone, Little Bay Shale Formation (oldest), and Dockyard Shale Formation (age unknown). These strata are noticeably faulted and deformed.

Predominantly of shale, the Catalan Bay Shale Formation also contains thick units composed of either brown calcareous sandstone, soft shaly sandstone interbedded with bluish-black limestone, and interlayered greenish-gray marls and dark grey cherts. The Catalan Bay Shale Formation contains unidentifiable echinoid spines and belemnite fragments and infrequent Early Jurassic (Middle Lias) ammonites.

The Gibraltar limestone consists of greyish-white or pale-gray compact, and sometime finely crystalline, medium to thick bedded limestones and dolomites that locally contain chert seams. This formation comprises about three-quarters of the Rock of Gibraltar. Geologists have found various poorly preserved and badly eroded and rolled marine fossils within it. The fossils found in the Gibraltar limestone include various brachiopods, corals, echinoid fragments, gastropods, pelecypods, and stromatolites. These fossils indicate an Early Jurassic age (Lower Lias) for the deposition of the Gibraltar limestone.

The Little Bay and Dockyard shale formations form a very minor part of the Rock of Gibraltar. The Little Bay Shale Formation consists of dark bluish-gray, unfossiliferous shale, which is interbedded with thin layers of grit, mudstone, and limestone. It predates the Gibraltar limestone. The Dockyard Shale Formation is an undescribed variegated shale of unknown age that lies buried beneath the Gibraltar's dockyard and coastal protection structures.

Although these geological formations were deposited during the early part of the Jurassic Period some 175–200 million years ago, their modern appearance is due to events of about 5 million years ago. When the African tectonic plate collided tightly with the Eurasian Plate, the Mediterranean became a lake that, over the course of time, dried up during the Messinian salinity crisis. The Atlantic Ocean then broke through the Strait of Gibraltar, and the resultant flooding created the Mediterranean Sea. The Rock forms part of the Betic Cordillera, a mountain range that dominates southeastern Iberia. The local geology of the region has been uplifting the rock at roughly 0.05 mm (0.0020 in) per year for the past 200,000 years (or a total uplift of around 10 metres or 33 feet), and for at least 50,000 years before that had been uplifted by 0.33 mm (0.013 in) per year for a combined uplift of about 26.5 metres (87 ft) in the past 250,000 years.

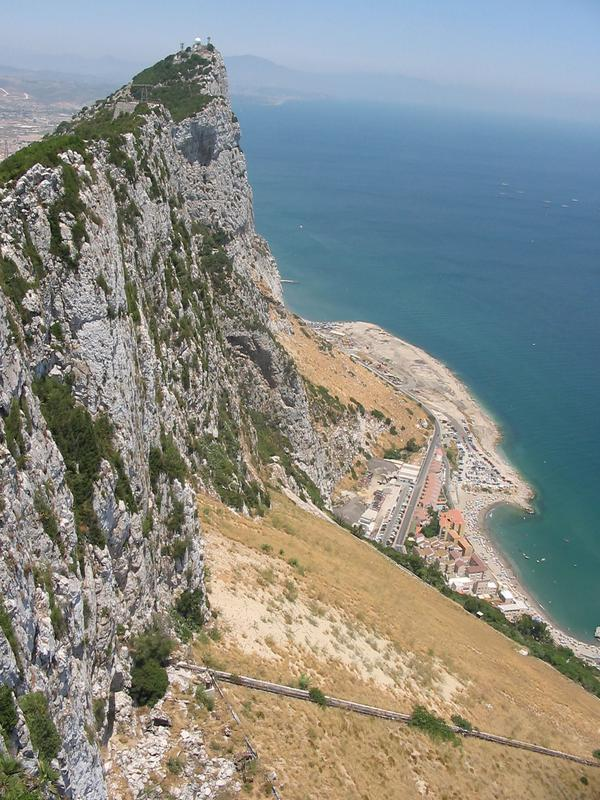
The sheer east side of the Rock of Gibraltar

The Rock of Gibraltar forms a peninsula jutting out into the Strait of Gibraltar from the southern coast of Spain. The promontory is linked to the continent by means of a sandy tombolo with a maximum elevation of 3 m (9.8 ft). To the north, the Rock rises vertically from sea level up to 411.5 m (1,350 ft) at Rock Gun Battery. The Rock's highest point stands 426 m (1,398 ft) near the south end above the strait at O'Hara's Battery. The Rock's central peak, Signal Hill and the top station of the Gibraltar Cable Car, stands at an elevation of 387 m (1,270 ft). The near-cliffs along the eastern side of the Rock drop down to a series of wind-blown sand slopes that date to the glaciations when sea levels were lower, and a sandy plain extended east from the base of the Rock. The western face, where the City of Gibraltar is located, is comparatively less steep.

Calcite, the mineral that makes up limestone, dissolves slowly in rainwater. Over time, this process can form caves. For this reason the Rock of Gibraltar contains over 100 caves. St. Michael's Cave, located halfway up the western slope of the Rock, is the most prominent and is a popular tourist attraction.

Fossils of Neanderthals have been found at several sites in Gibraltar. In 1848, a Neanderthal woman's skull was found at Forbes' Quarry, located on the north face of the Rock. However, its significance was not recognised until after the 1856 discovery of the type specimen in the Neander Valley. Excavations in Gorham's Cave, located near sea level on the eastern side of the Rock, found evidence it was used by Neanderthals, and plant and animal remains in the cave gave evidence of Neanderthals' highly varied diet.

== Eastern face ==
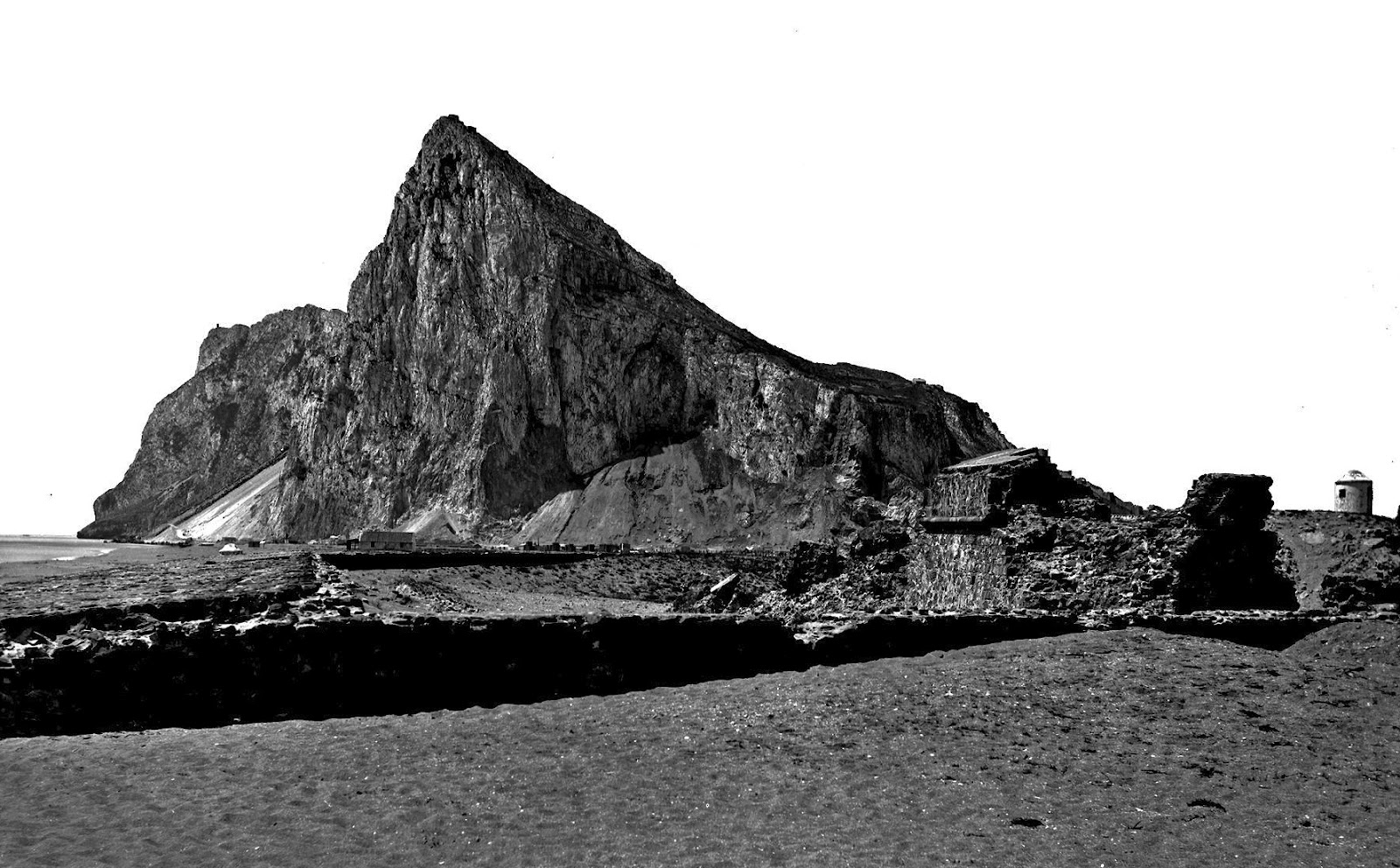
Eastern face, Rock of Gibraltar, in 1880, viewed from N-E

The Eastern Face of the Rock comprises steep cliffs and scree slopes descending to the sea, allowing little space for human habitation. In modern times a road (Sir Herbert Miles Road, named after Lieutenant General Sir Herbert Miles, Governor of Gibraltar 1913–1918) has been cut into the shore, its southernmost part being through a tunnel (Dudley Ward Way, named after Sir Alfred Dudley Ward, Governor of Gibraltar 1962–1965) in the rock. Towards the south-east end of the Rock close to sea-level is located Gorham's Cave, a UNESCO World Heritage Site.

== Fortification ==
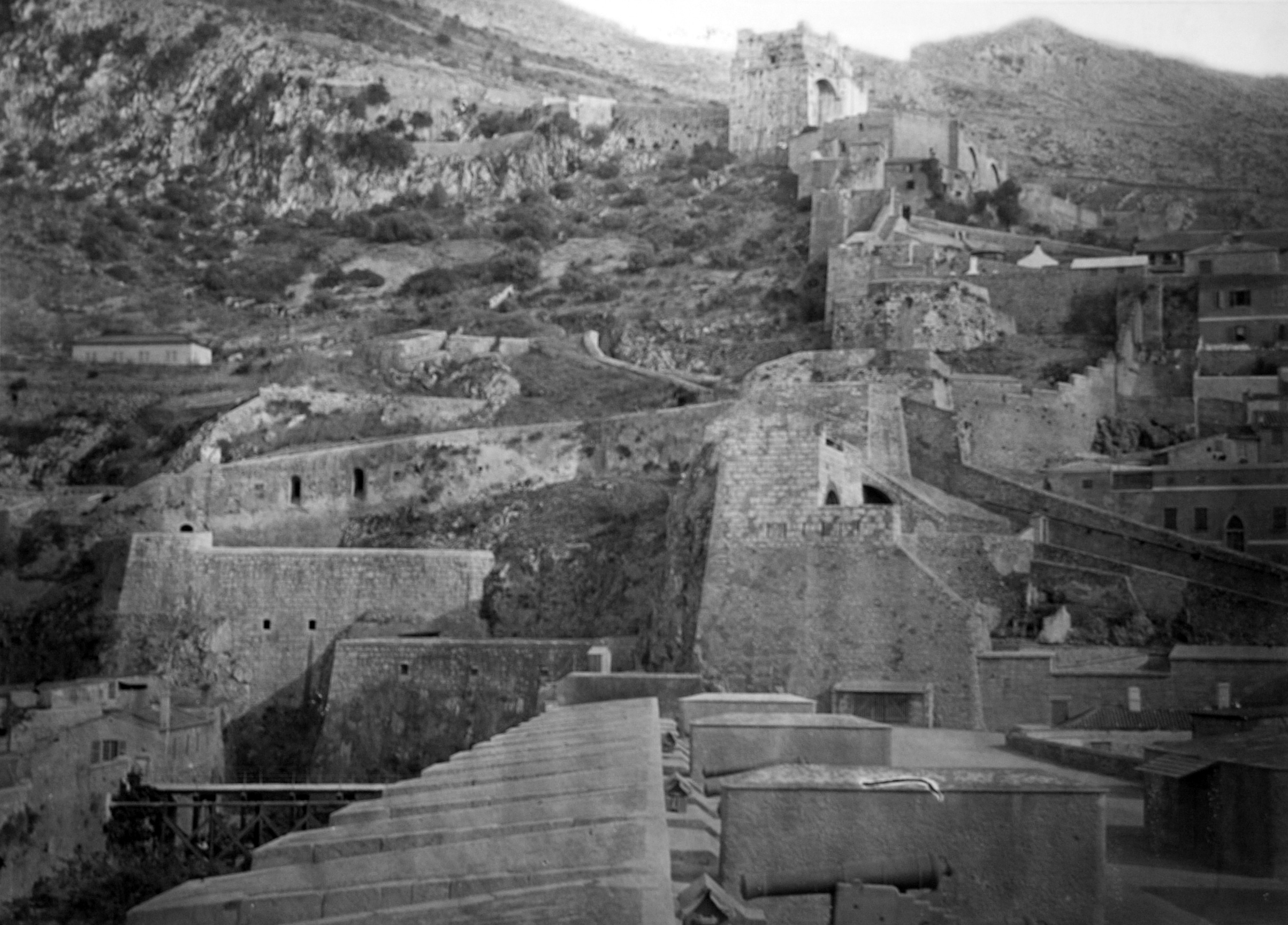
The Moorish Castle

=== Moorish castle ===
The Moorish Castle is a relic of Moorish rule over Gibraltar, which lasted for 710 years. It was built in the year AD 711, when the Berber chieftain Tariq ibn-Ziyad first landed on the rock that still bears his name. The 17th-century Muslim historian Al-Maqqari wrote that upon landing, Tariq burned his ships.

The principal building that remains is the Tower of Homage, a massive building of brick and very hard concrete called tapia. The upper part of the tower housed the former occupants' living apartments and Moorish bath.

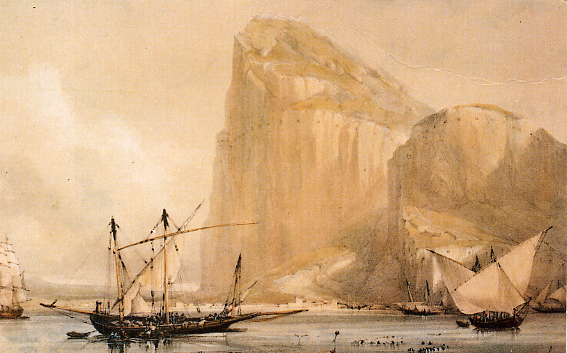
The Rock of Gibraltar's North Front cliff face from Bayside (c. 1810) showing the embrasures in the Rock

=== Galleries ===
A unique feature of the Rock is its system of underground passages, known as the Galleries or the Great Siege Tunnels.

The first of these was dug towards the end of the Great Siege of Gibraltar, which lasted from 1779 to 1783. General Elliot, afterwards Lord Heathfield, who commanded the garrison throughout the siege, was anxious to bring flanking fire on the Spanish batteries in the plain below the North face of the Rock. On the suggestion of Sergeant-Major Henry Ince of the Royal Engineers, he had a tunnel bored from a point above Willis's Battery to communicate with the Notch, a natural projection from the North face. The plan was to mount a battery there. There was no intention at first of making embrasures in this tunnel, but an opening was found necessary for ventilation; as soon as it had been made a gun was mounted in it. By the end of the siege, the British had constructed six such embrasures, and mounted four guns.

The Galleries, which tourists may visit, were a later development of the same idea and were finished in 1797. They consist of a whole system of halls, embrasures, and passages, of a total length of nearly 304 m (997 ft). From them, one may see a series of unique views of the Bay of Gibraltar, the isthmus, and Spain.

=== Second world war onwards ===
When World War II broke out in 1939, the authorities evacuated the civilian population to Morocco, the United Kingdom, Jamaica, and Madeira so that the military could fortify Gibraltar against a possible German attack. By 1942 there were over 30,000 British soldiers, sailors, and airmen on the Rock. They expanded the tunnel system and made the Rock a keystone in the defence of shipping routes to the Mediterranean.

In February 1997, it was revealed the British had a secret plan called Operation Tracer to conceal servicemen in tunnels beneath the Rock in case the Germans captured it. The team in the rock would have radio equipment with which to report enemy movements. A six-man team waited undercover at Gibraltar for two and a half years. The Germans never got close to capturing the rock and so the men were never sealed inside. The team was disbanded to resume civilian life when the war ended.

=== Sayings ===
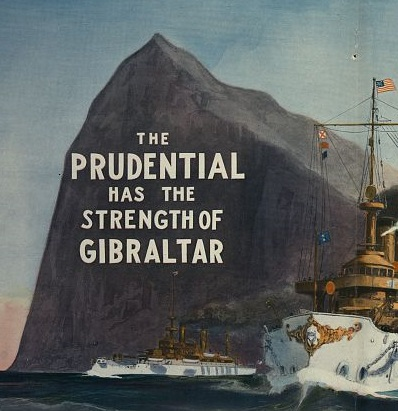
1909 Prudential Insurance advertisement

The saying "solid as the Rock of Gibraltar" is used to describe an entity that is very safe or firm.

The motto of the Royal Gibraltar Regiment and Gibraltar itself is Nulli Expugnabilis Hosti (Latin for "No Enemy Shall Expel Us").

Jazz standard Love Is Here to Stay uses Gibraltar as a metaphor for longevity: "In time, the Rockies may crumble, Gibraltar may tumble. They're only made of clay. But our love is here to stay."

It is also the logo of Prudential Financial.

== Nature reserve ==
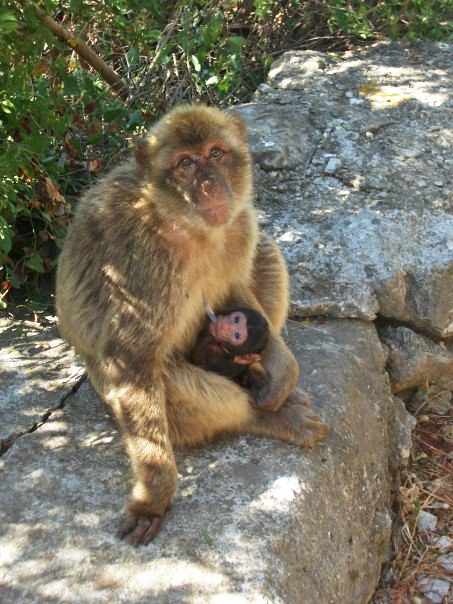
Female Barbary macaque feeding her young at Mediterranean Steps, on the Rock of Gibraltar

Approximately 40% of Gibraltar's land area was declared a nature reserve in 1993.

=== Flora and fauna ===
The flora and fauna of the Gibraltar Nature Reserve are of conservation interest and are protected by law. Within it is a range of animals and plants, but the highlights are the Barbary macaques (the famous Rock apes), the Barbary partridges, and flowers such as Gibraltar's own chickweed, thyme and the Gibraltar candytuft. The Barbary macaques may have originated from an escape of North African animals transported to Spain; it is also possible that the original Gibraltar macaques are a remnant of populations that are known to have spread throughout Southern Europe during the Pliocene, up to 5.5 million years ago. Some animals of the Rock have been reintroduced by the Alameda Wildlife Conservation Park who have three Barbary macaques.

==== Birds ====
The Rock of Gibraltar, at the head of the Strait, is a prominent headland, which accumulates migrating birds during the passage periods. The vegetation on the Rock, unique in southern Iberia, provides a temporary home for many species of migratory birds that stop to rest and feed before continuing migration for their crossing over the sea and desert. In spring, they return to replenish before continuing their journeys to Western Europe, journeys which may take them as far as Greenland or Russia.

The Rock has been identified as an Important Bird Area by BirdLife International, because it is a migratory bottleneck, or choke point, for an estimated 250,000 raptors that cross the Strait annually, and because it supports breeding populations of Barbary partridges and lesser kestrels.

== See also ==
- Disputed status of the isthmus between Gibraltar and Spain
- Gibraltar Cable Car
- List of famous rocks
