= Gibraltar Botanic Gardens =

Botanical garden in Gibraltar

Gibraltar Botanic Gardens La Alameda
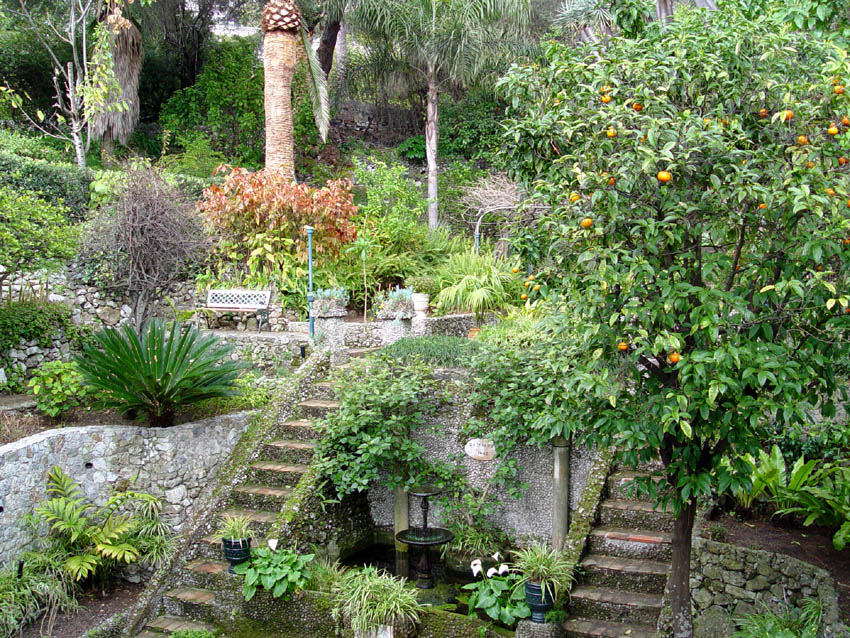
- The Dell in the heart of La Alameda Gardens

- Location within Gibraltar
- Type: Botanical garden
- Location: Gibraltar
- Coordinates: 36°07′53″N 5°21′04″W
- Area: 6 hectares (15 acres)
- Opened: 1816
- Owner: Government of Gibraltar
- Operator: Wildlife (Gibraltar) Limited
- Status: Open all year
- Plants: Aloes, palms, dragon trees, sunken garden
- Species: 1,900
- Director: Dr. Keith Bensusan
- Website: GibraltarGardens.gi

The Gibraltar Botanic Gardens or La Alameda Gardens are a botanical garden in Gibraltar, spanning around 6 hectares (15 acres). The Rock Hotel lies above the park.

== History ==
In 1816 the gardens were commissioned by the British Governor of Gibraltar General George Don. It was his intention that the soldiers stationed in the fortress would have a pleasant recreational area to enjoy when off duty, and so inhabitants could enjoy the air protected from the extreme heat of the sun.

The gardens were resurrected in 1991 by an external company when it was realised that since the 1970s they had fallen into a poor state. Three years later the gardens had the addition of a zoo: the Alameda Wildlife Conservation Park.

In 2001 a bronze sculpture of James Joyce's Molly Bloom was installed in the gardens. This running figure was commissioned from Jon Searle to celebrate the bicentenary of the Gibraltar Chronicle in 2001.

=== The Eliott Memorial ===
General Don had commissioned a memorial of George Augustus Eliott, 1st Baron Heathfield, in 1815, which did not materialise in the form initially requested. A colossal statue of General Eliot, carved from the bowsprit of the Spanish ship San Juan Nepomuceno, taken at the Battle of Trafalgar, was first created. That statue was taken to the governor's residence, The Convent, where it stands today, being replaced by the present bronze bust in 1858. This statue is guarded for four 18th-century howitzers.

== Plants of the gardens ==
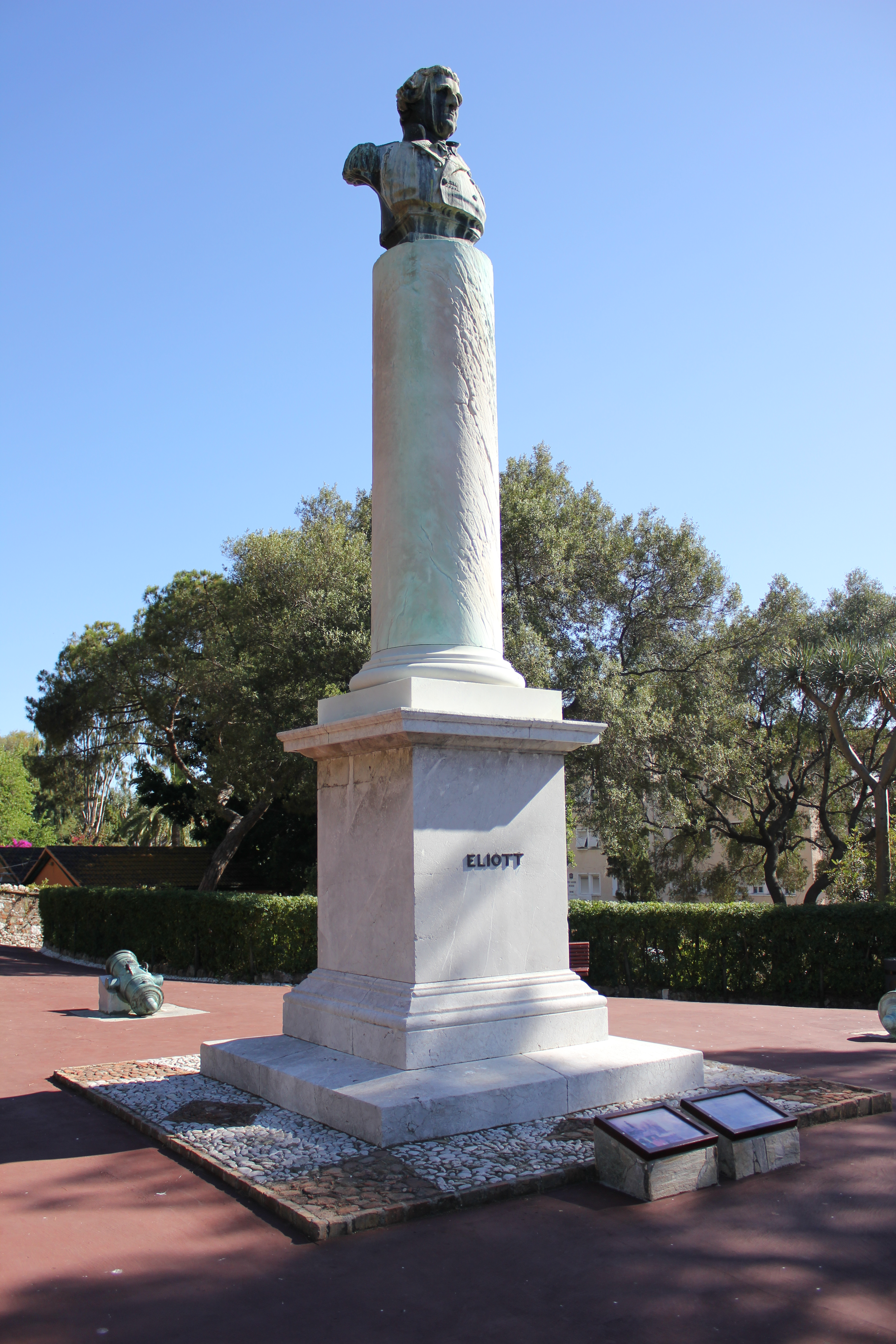
The Elliott Memorial dates from 1858

The plants of the Alameda Gardens are a combination of native species and others brought in from abroad:

- Dracaena draco (Canary Islands Dragon Tree), a subtropical Dragon Tree native to the Canary Islands, Cape Verde, Madeira, Azores, and locally in western Morocco. The oldest dragon tree in the gardens is about 300 years old.
- Stone pine (Pinus pinea), a species of pine native of southern Europe, primarily the Iberian Peninsula.
- Wild Olive (Olea europaea), a species of small tree in the family Oleaceae.
- Celtis australis (European Nettle Tree), a deciduous tree that can be among 20 to 25 metres of height.
- Grevillea robusta (Australian Silk Oak), the largest species in the genus Grevillea. There is only one specimen of this tree in the gardens.
- Canary Island date palm (Phoenix canariensis), a large palm native to the Canary Islands off the Atlantic coast of north Africa.
- Washingtonia filifera (Washingtonia), a palm native to the desert oases of Central, southern and southwestern Arizona, southern Nevada, extreme northwest Mexico and inland deserts of southern California.
- Howea forsteriana (Kentia palm), endemic to Lord Howe Island.
- Ptychosperma elegans (Solitaire Palm), endemic to the Northern Territory and eastern Queensland in Australia.
- Chinese hibiscus (Hibiscus rosa-sinensis), an evergreen shrub native to East Asia.
- Bougainvillea, a genus of flowering plants native to South America from Brazil west to Peru and south to southern Argentina (Chubut Province).
- Asteraceae (daisies), the second largest family of flowering plants.
- Pelargonium, a genus of flowering plants.
- Succulent plant, water-retaining plants adapted to arid climate or soil conditions.

=== Events ===
The Alameda Open Air Theatre was inaugurated once again on 12 April 1996 at four o'clock with three bands of music playing – the same number of bands as had attended 180 years before to the hour at the opening of the Alameda Gardens in 1816. To extend its use from just theatre to general use, a number of new features were introduced, like the waterfall and lake – the largest area of open fresh water on the Rock, with Koi Carp and a collection of exotic lilies. Since its opening, this venue has been used for a variety of purposes, from beauty contests to band concerts, also weddings, dinner dances, conferences and variety shows. It also is the main venue for the GIB Fringe.

The theatre is available for hire and all proceeds will go directly into continued improvements in the theatre and in the rest of Gibraltar's historic and rapidly improving Alameda Gardens.

Useful information about the theatre and its facilities: Seating Capacity: 435 Stage Area: 120 m^{2} Lighting Equipment: 34 Wide and Beams with coloured filters if required. 3 stage and 3 public entrances. Bar, changing rooms and toilet facilities. Seating with table maximum capacity: 300

== Gallery ==
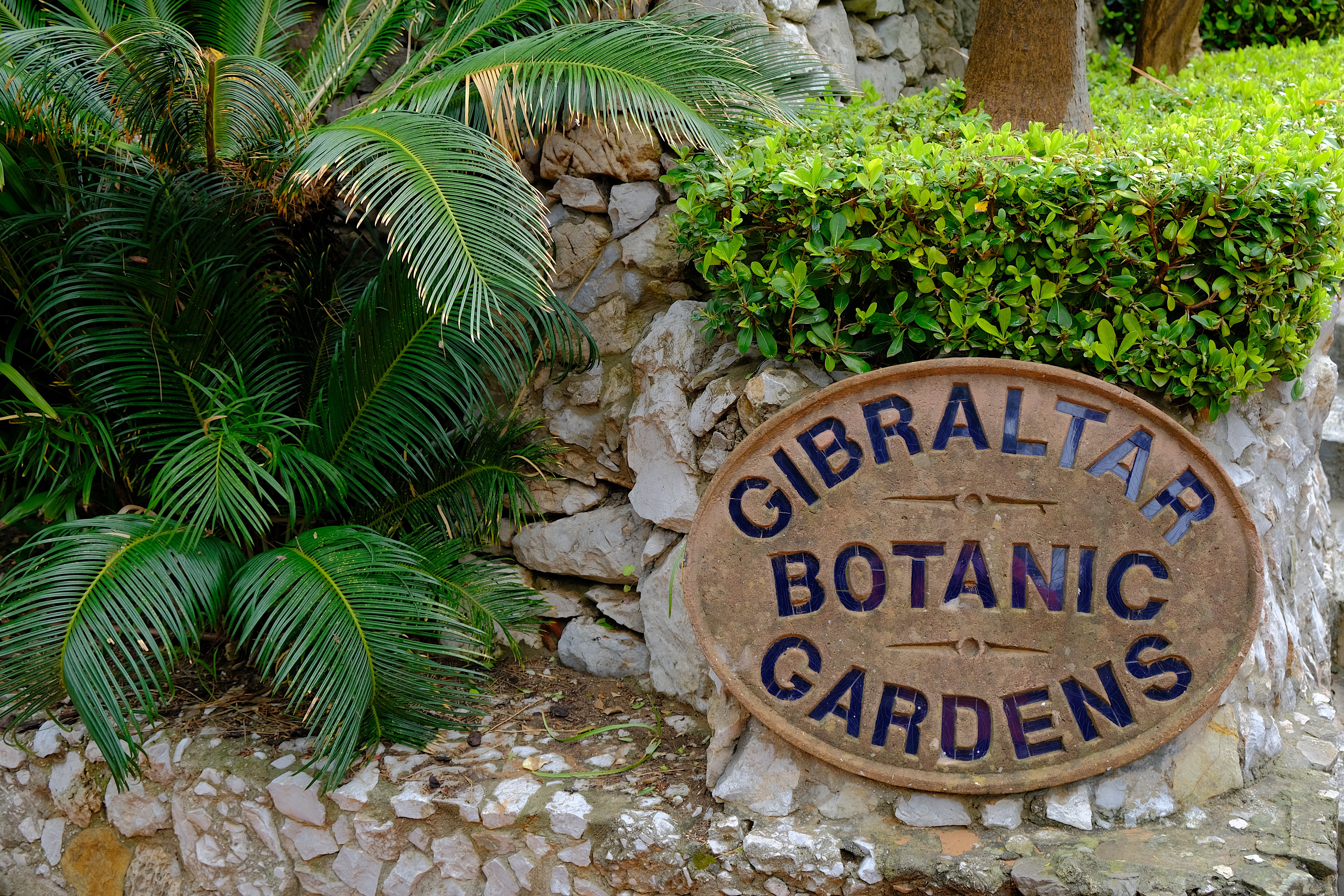
Gibraltar Botanic Gardens in 2022

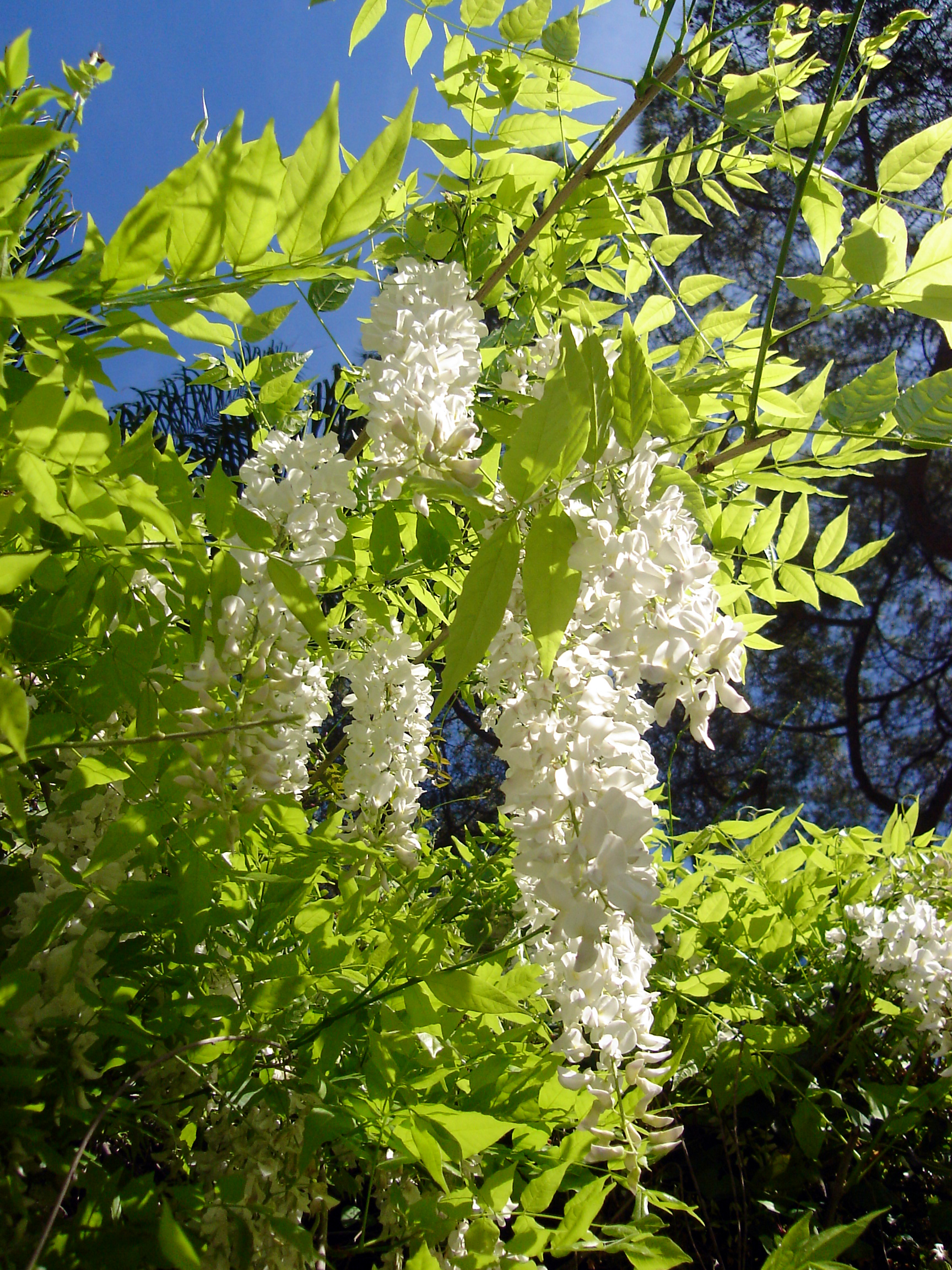
Wisteria sinensis (Chinese Wisteria), a woody, deciduous, perennial climbing vine in the genus Wisteria, in the gardens

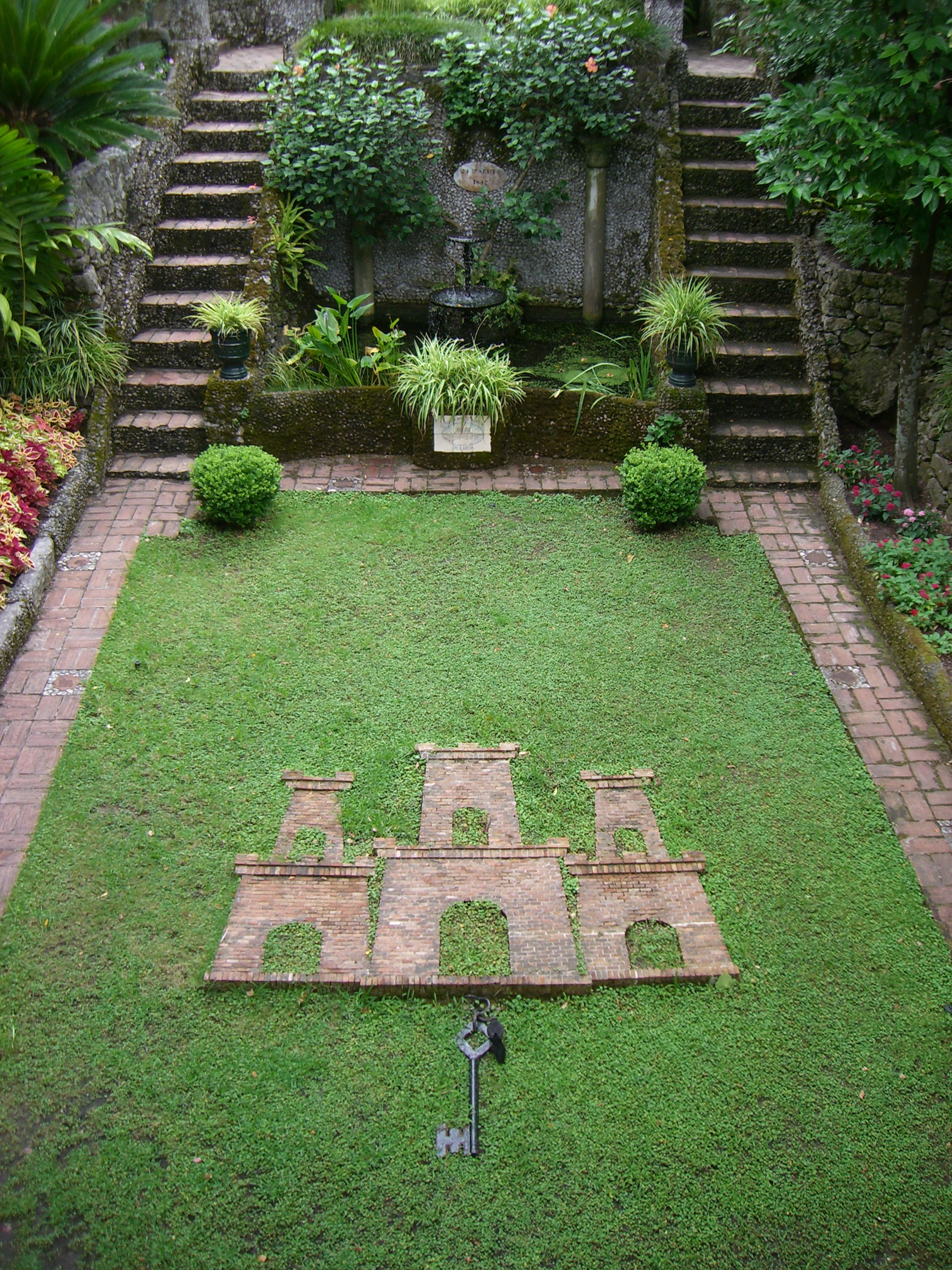
Castle and key set in the lawn of The Dell

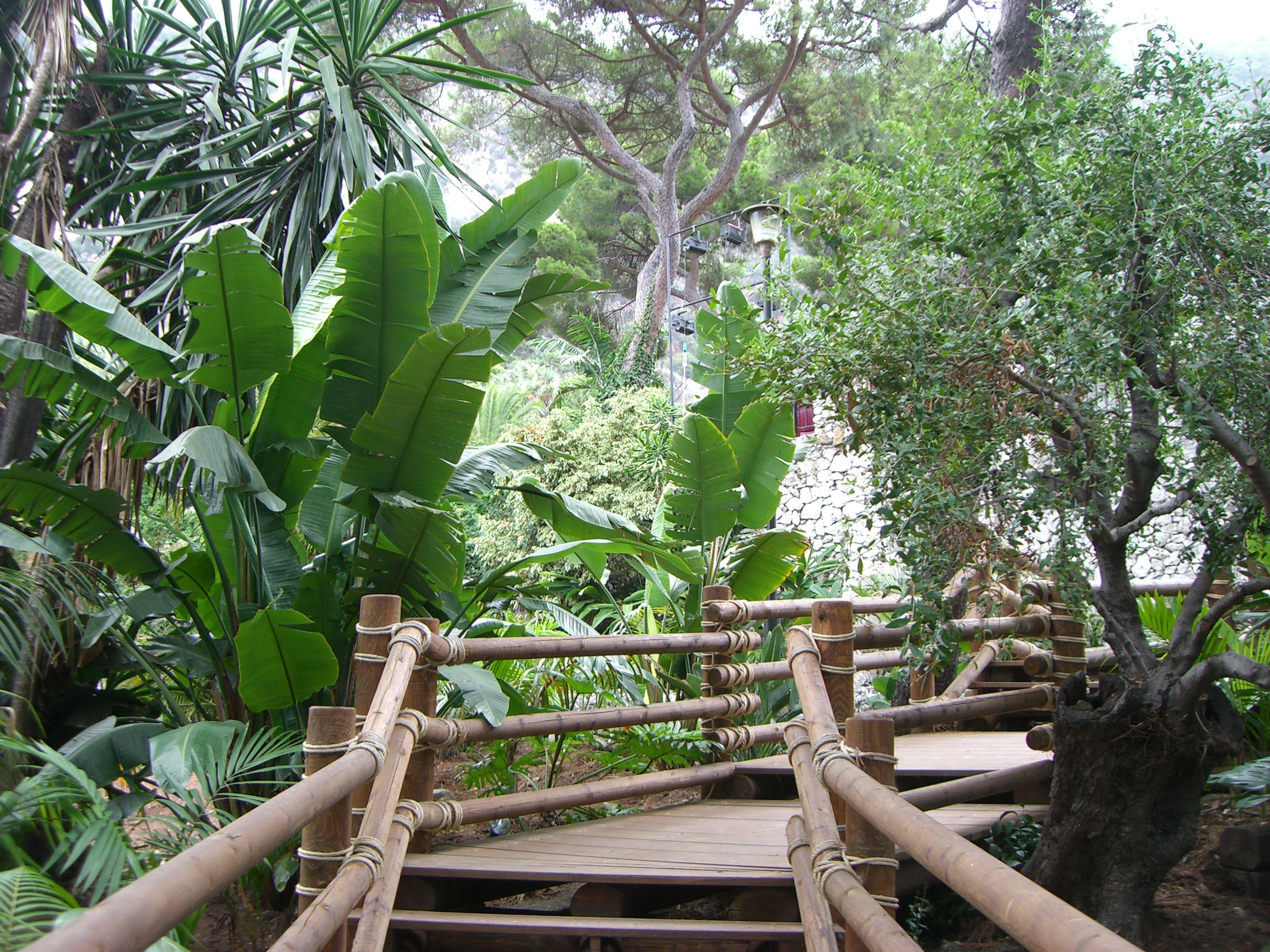
Wooden bridge in the Africa beds

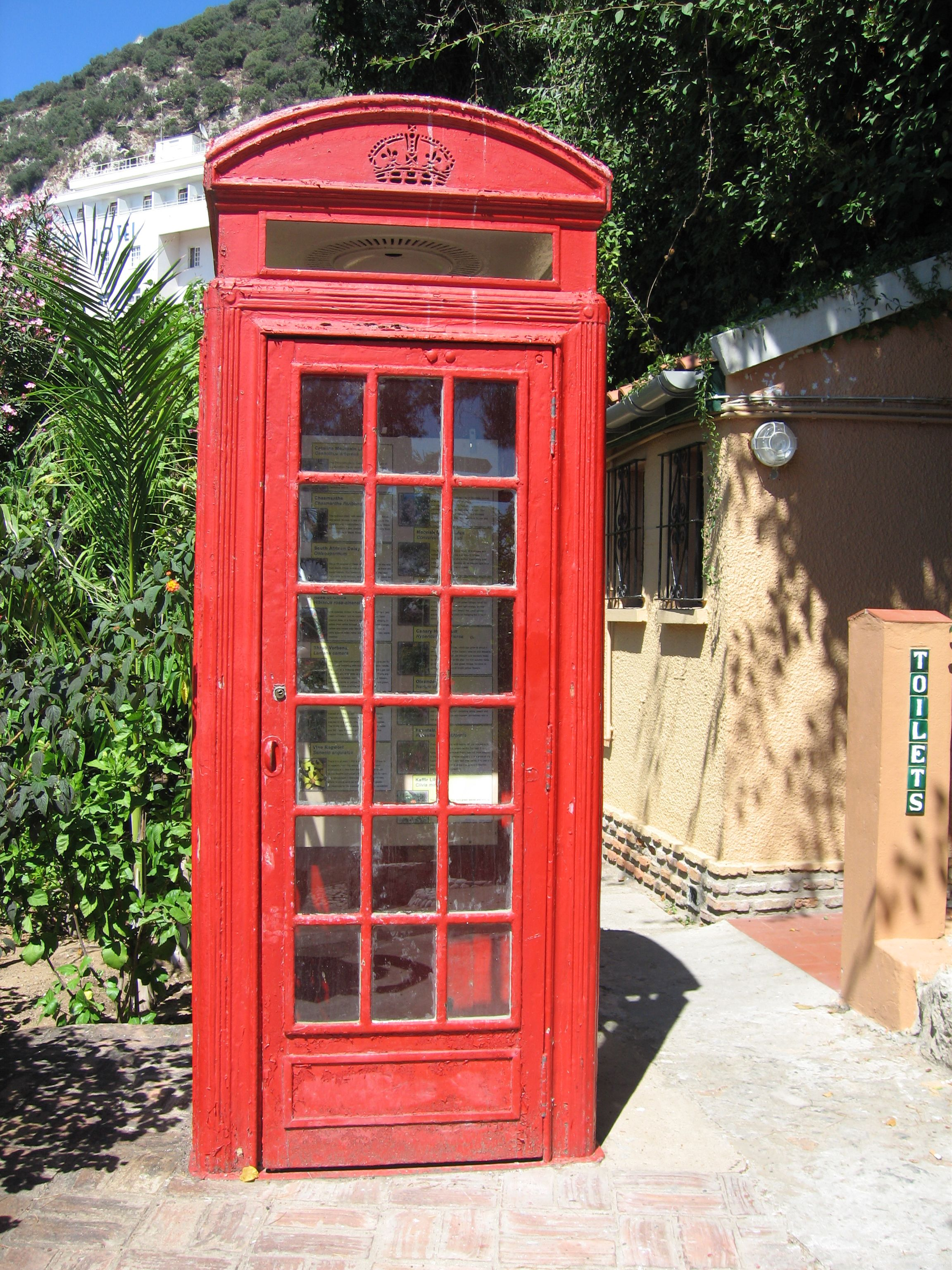
British-style red telephone box

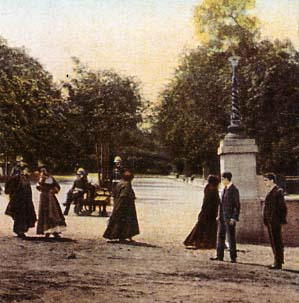
An evening stroll in the 19th century at the entrance of the Alameda Gardens

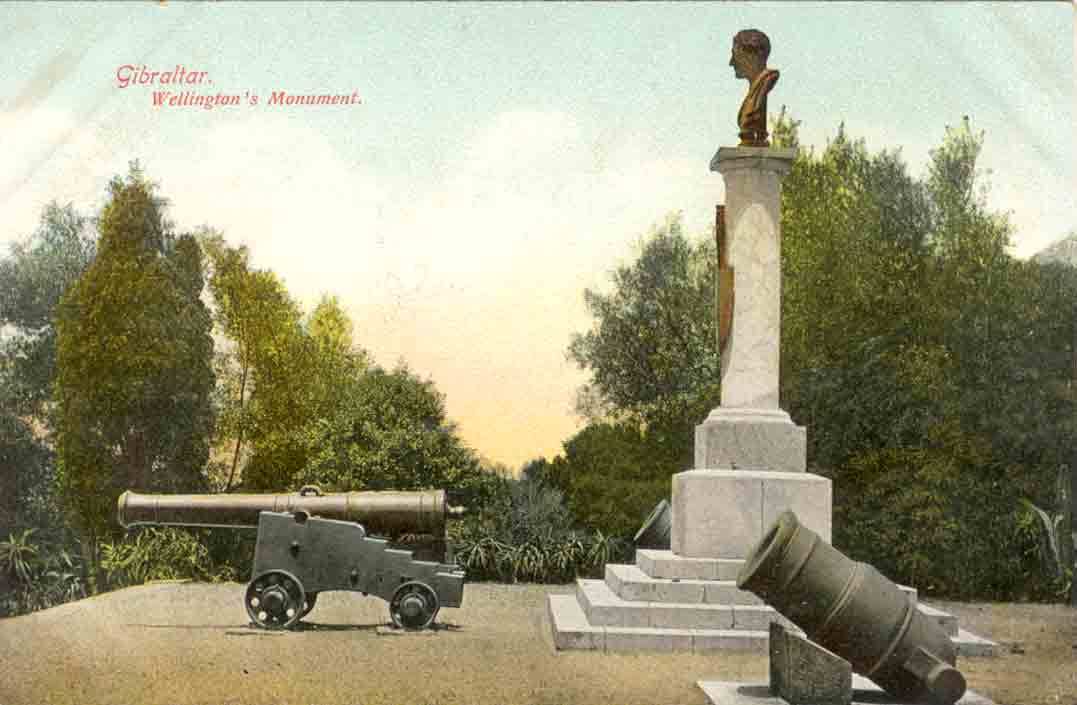
Duke of Wellington's memorial

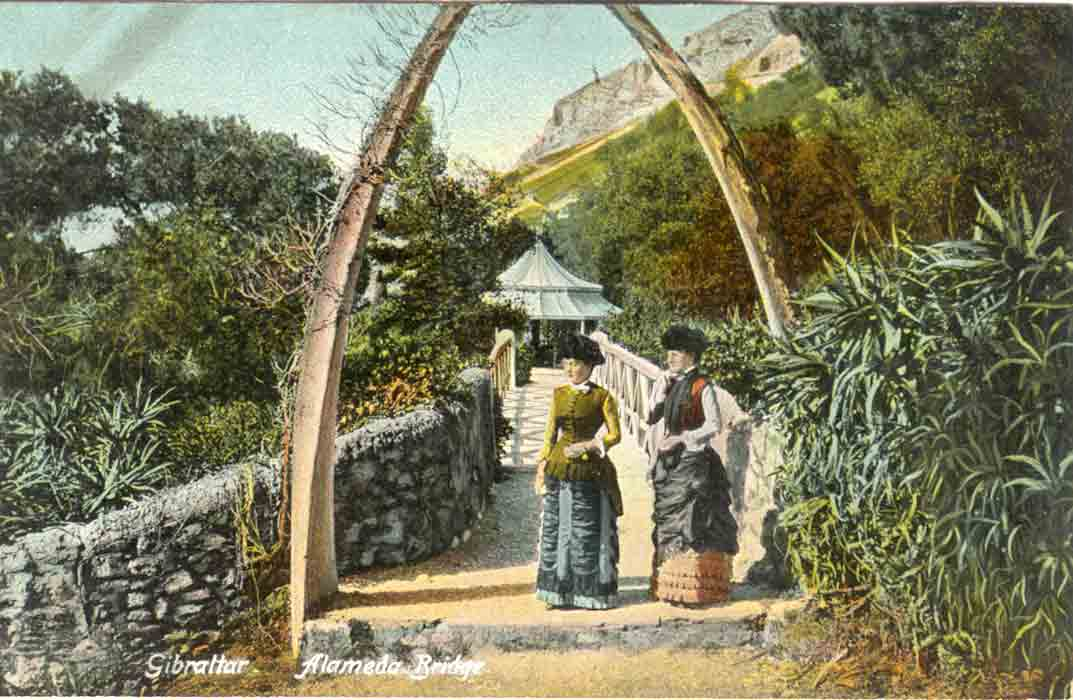
Whalebone arch

== See also ==
- List of plants in the Gibraltar Botanic Gardens
- Gibraltar candytuft
- Alameda Wildlife Conservation Park
- Grove
