= Alfred Holmes =

Sergeant Alfred Holmes BEM
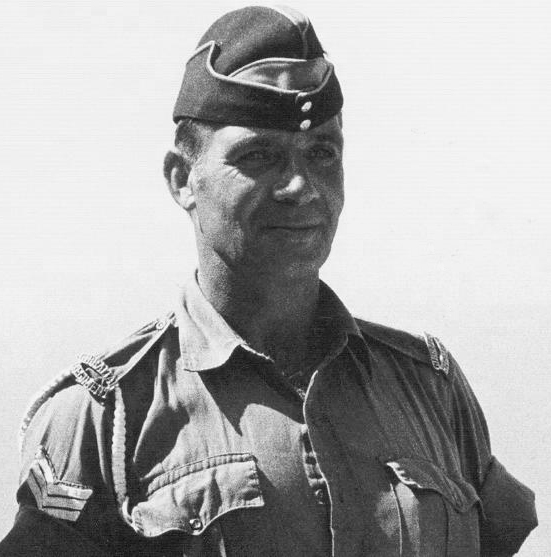
- Alfred Holmes on duty at the Upper Rock (Gibraltar)
- Born: 1 February 1931; Gibraltar
- Died: 1 January 1994 (aged 62); Old St. Bernard's Hospital, Gibraltar
- Burial place: North Front Cemetery, Gibraltar; 36.148794°N 5.344742°W
- Military career
- Allegiance: Gibraltar, United Kingdom
- Branch: British Army
- Service years: 1954 – 1986
- Rank: Sergeant
- Nickname: "El de los monos"
- Service number: GR/3548
- Unit: Gibraltar Regiment
- Awards: British Empire Medal

Sgt. Alfred Holmes BEM (1 February 1931 – 1 January 1994) was a Gibraltarian sergeant of the Gibraltar Regiment (now the Royal Gibraltar Regiment). He was a well remembered Officer-in-Charge of the Apes who held this position, caring for the Gibraltar Barbary macaques, for over 38 years. He described the macaques as "Gibraltar's greatest treasure".

== Early life ==
Holmes was a second generation Gibraltarian, born in Gibraltar to Gibraltarian parents Arthur Frederick Holmes and Mercedes Carrara. His father had been previously married and fathered five children from that relationship. Following the death of his wife, he married Mercedes who was later to be Alfred's mother. Alfred was to be the only child out of that relationship as his mother died when he was just three years old. His father later remarried one final time, fathering a further five children, giving Alfred a total of ten half siblings.

In 1954 he married Spanish domestic worker Leonor Corbacho Velasco, a young lady from Valverde del Fresno (Cáceres). They met in La Línea de la Concepción, the Spanish municipality on the other side of the Gibraltar–Spain border, where she resided at the time. They went on to have two children, Maria de las Mercedes in 1955 and Edward Maximo in 1962.

== Career ==
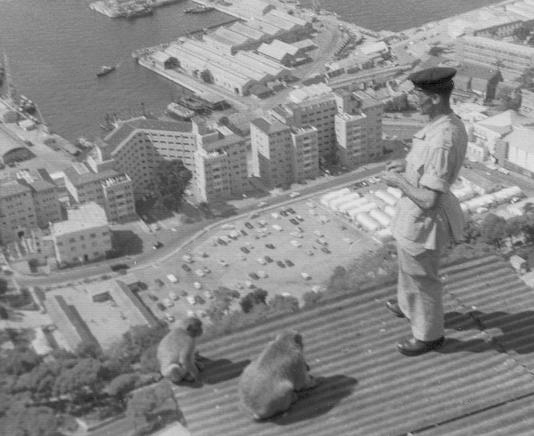
Sgt. Alfred Holmes alongside two Gibraltar Barbary macaques, looking down on the city of Gibraltar.

In the 1950s, Holmes enlisted in the Gibraltar Regiment where he later ascended to the rank of sergeant. He was appointed as a non-commissioned officer of Officer-in-Charge of the Apes.

From 1913 to 1991, the Gibraltar Barbary macaques were the responsibility of the British Army, which appointed a non-commissioned officer from the Gibraltar Regiment as Officer-in-Charge of the Apes. Holmes took over responsibility for the macaques from Gunner William Portlock, becoming the first Gibraltarian with this charge. During his service, Sgt. Holmes fed, nursed, and guarded the monkeys, generally working to maintain their well-being. He knew all of the macaques by the names he himself had given them. They were mostly named after Governors, brigadiers and high-ranking officers as well as his children. Sgt. Holmes could communicate with the animals by means of eye signals and barely perceptible head movements which he would use to stop them from taking food offered to them by tourists. He would even take young orphaned monkeys to his wife to help rear at home. He would also take sick or injured monkeys to the Royal Naval Hospital where they would receive the exact medical treatment as an enlisted soldier. For his work with the macaques, he was best known locally by the nickname of "El de los monos" (Spanish: He of the monkeys).

Sgt. Holmes' time in the job made him an authority on this group of Barbary macaques, with his knowledge being sought by various scientific studies on the monkeys from around the globe.

== Awards ==
Holmes was awarded the British Empire Medal in 1976.

== Death ==
In the early 1990s, Holmes was diagnosed with esophageal cancer, later traveling to London to undergo major abdominal surgery. The cancer eventually resulted in his death on 1 January 1994 at Old St. Bernard's Hospital in Gibraltar. His body now rests in a family grave together with his father, grandfather and various half siblings at North Front Cemetery, Gibraltar.

== See also ==
- List of Gibraltarians
