= Barbary macaques in Gibraltar =

Population of monkeys in Europe

Coordinates: 36.132248°N 5.348875°W

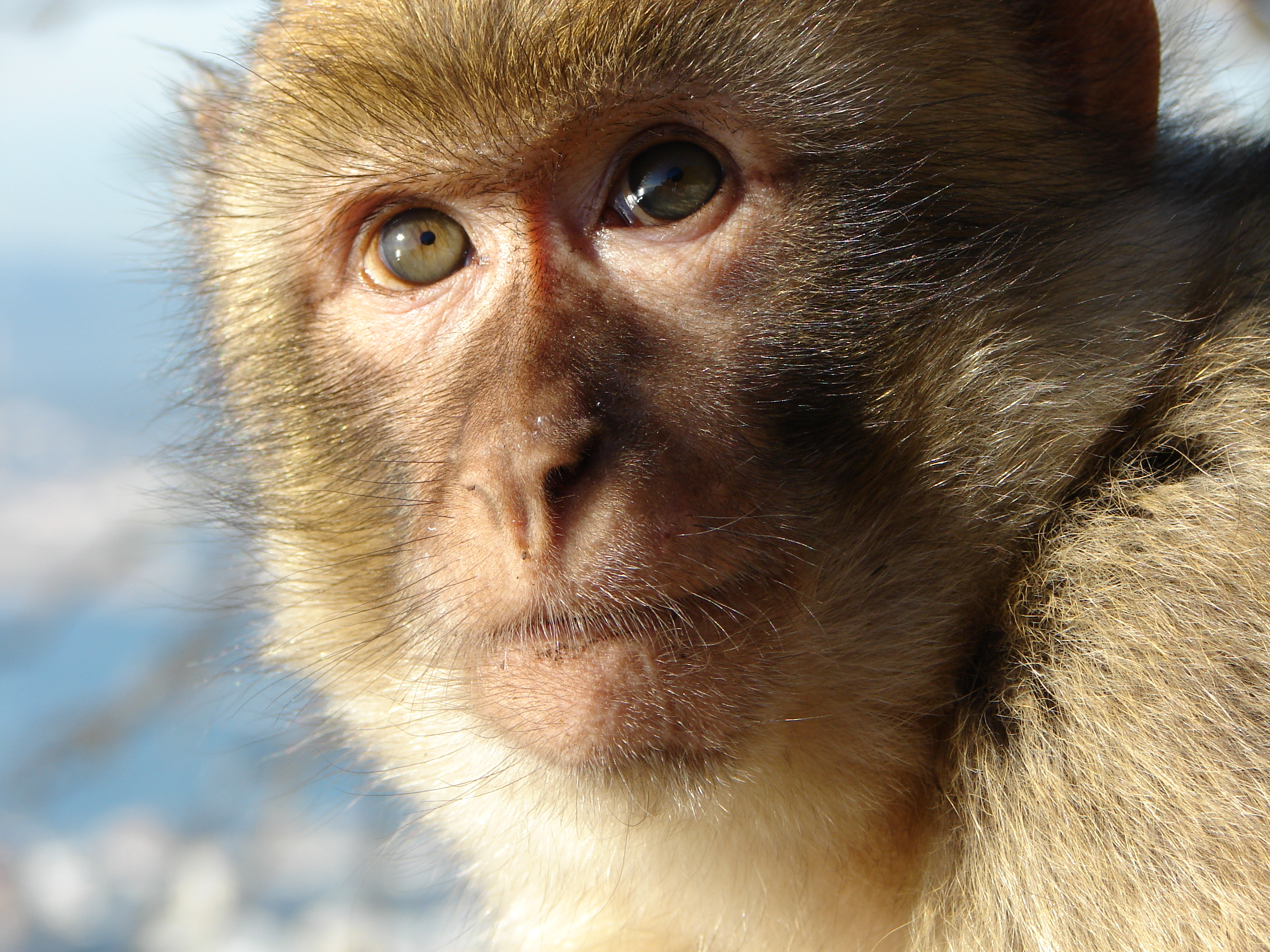
This young Barbary macaque is part of a group of 25 to 70 individuals from several different monkey families in Gibraltar.

Originally from the Atlas Mountains and the Rif of Morocco, the Barbary macaque population in Gibraltar is the only wild monkey population on the European continent. Although most Barbary monkey populations in the African continent (specifically Algeria, Tunisia and Morocco) are experiencing decline due to hunting and deforestation, the Gibraltar population is increasing. As of 2020, some 300 animals in five troops occupy the Upper Rock area of the Gibraltar Nature Reserve, though they make occasional forays into the town. Barbary macaques are classified as monkeys (Macaca sylvanus), yet they are known locally and erroneously as "Barbary apes", "rock apes" or "lesser apes" because they are a tailless simian species. Spanish-speakers simply refer to them as monos (English: monkeys) when conversing in Spanish.

== Origin ==
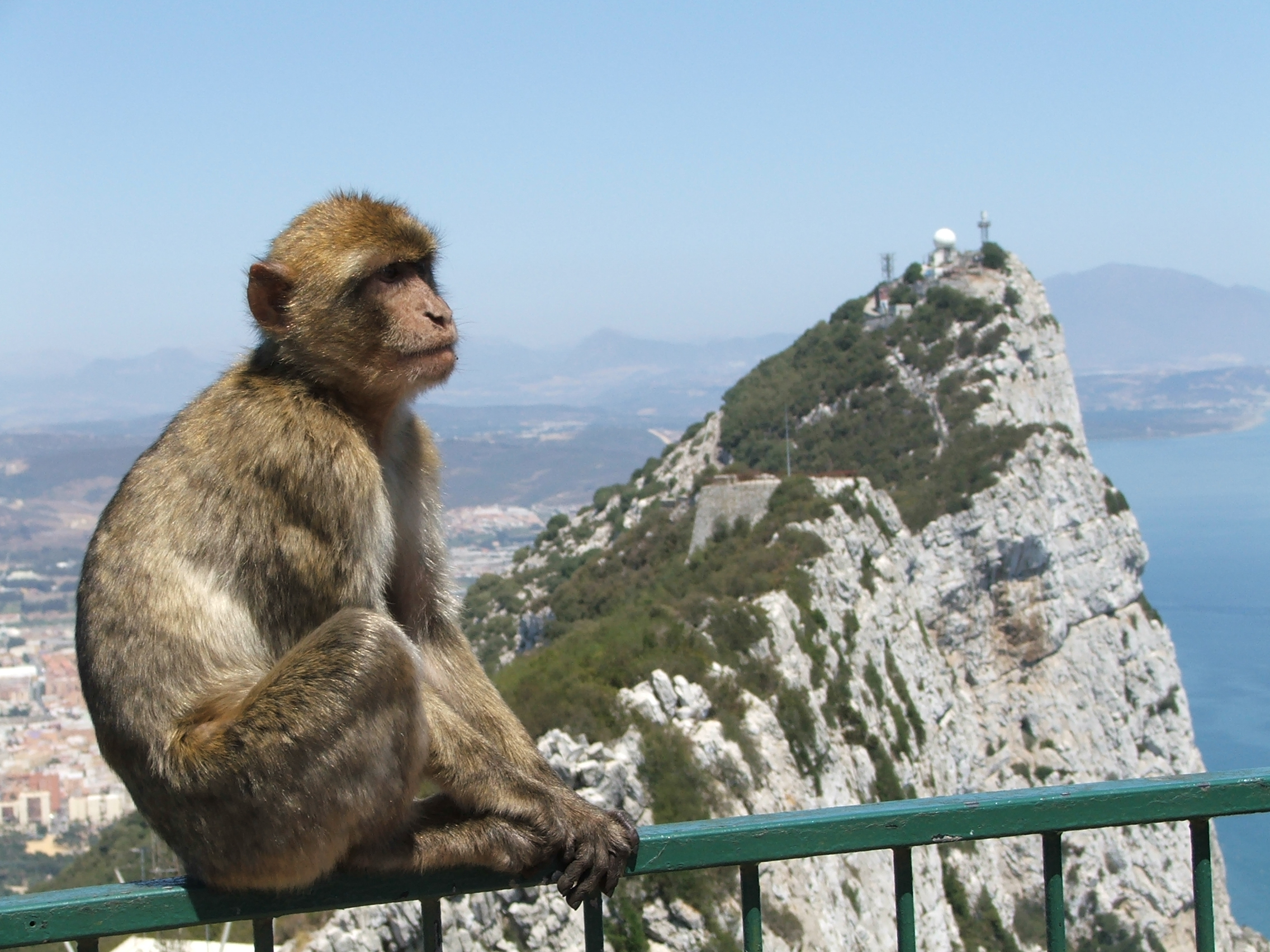
A Barbary macaque sitting on a fence at the Gibraltar Cable Car top station

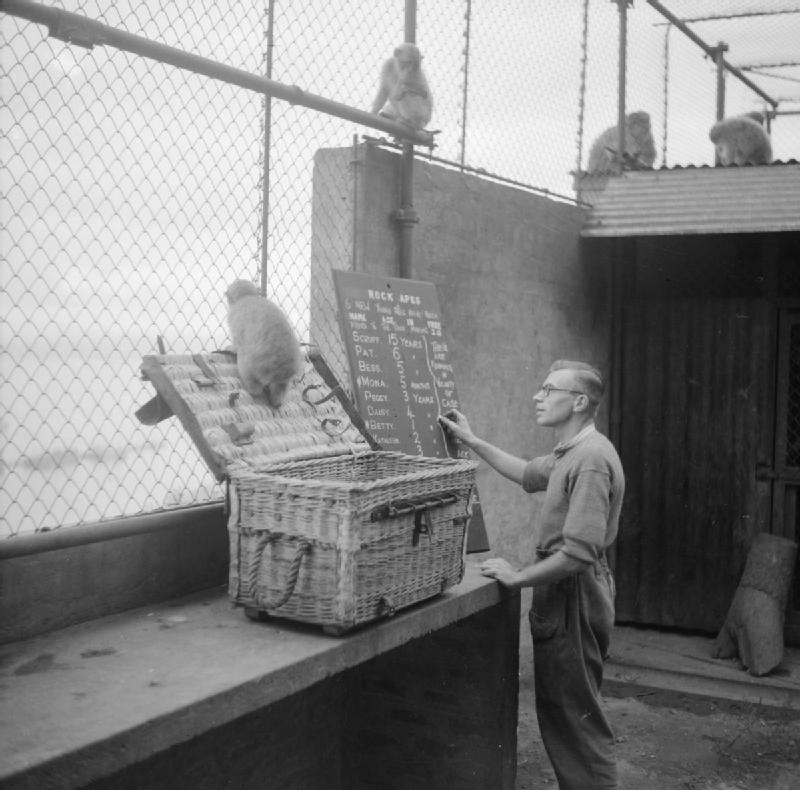
Second World War-era image of Gunner D. R. Carpenter registering a new arrival of a macaque from Tangiers

The name "Barbary" refers to the Berbers (Amazigh people) of North Africa who, since the beginning of history, had ties with the animals surrounding their region, such as the Barbary macaques. The macaque population had also been present on the Rock of Gibraltar long before Gibraltar was captured by the British in 1704 and according to records, since prior to reconquest of Gibraltar from the Arabs and Berbers. It was during the Islamic period where a purported introduction may have taken place. In his work Historia de la Muy Noble y Más Leal Ciudad de Gibraltar (History of the Very Noble and Most Loyal City of Gibraltar), written between 1605 and 1610, Alonso Hernández del Portillo, the first chronicler of Gibraltar, wrote:

But now let us speak of other and living producers which in spite of the asperity of the rock still maintain themselves in the mountain, there are monkeys, who may be called the true owners, with possession from time immemorial, always tenacious of the dominion, living for the most part on the eastern side in high and inaccessible chasms.

In his History of Gibraltar (1782), Ignacio López de Ayala, a Spanish historian like Portillo, wrote of the monkeys:

Neither the incursions of Moor, the Spaniards nor the English, nor cannon nor bomb of either have been able to dislodge them.

Repeated introduction of animals and the lack of reliable data concerning founders of the Gibraltar macaque population has obscured their origin. The fact that all extant Gibraltarian mtDNA haplotypes were also found in North Africa, combined with the lack of fossil evidence of M. sylvanus in Gibraltar at the end of the last glaciation, greatly diminishes the possibility that the Gibraltar macaques represent or include any remnant of the original European population, a possibility which can nevertheless not be excluded. Indeed, it had been earlier suggested that the original Gibraltar macaques were a remnant of populations that had spread throughout Southern Europe during the Pliocene, up to 5.5 million years ago. The Macaca sylvanus species is listed as endangered by the IUCN Red List and is declining. About 75% of the total population is found in the Middle Atlas Mountains.

During the Pleistocene, this species inhabited a greater area around the Mediterranean coasts and Europe. During warm interglacials it reached as far north as Germany and Britain, while retreating to southern glacial refugia during cold periods. The last confirmed natural records of Barbary macaques in Europe date to 85–40,000 years ago.

== Tourism ==
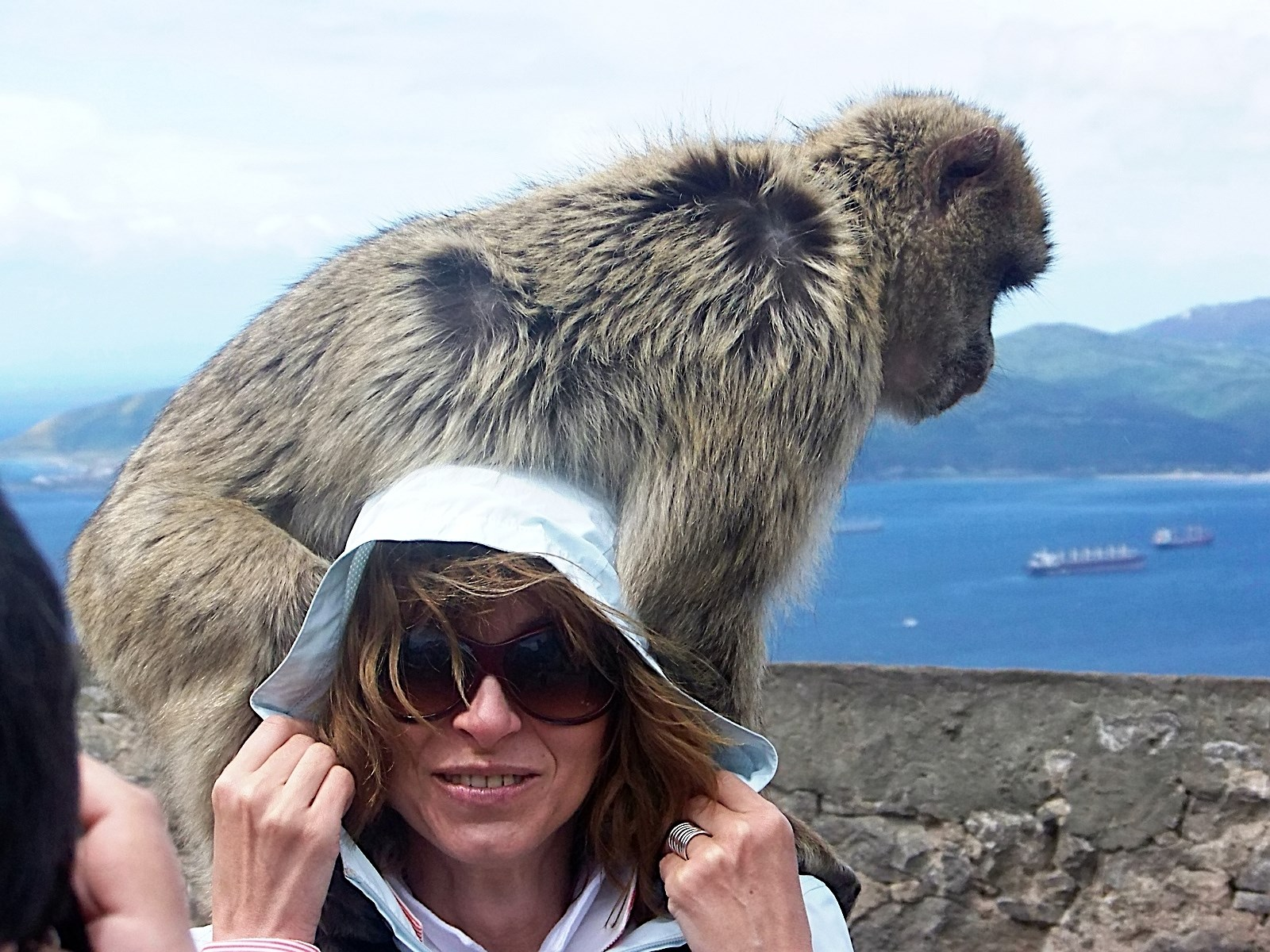
Although the Barbary macaques form part of tourism in Gibraltar, direct contact with them (as shown in this photograph) is strongly discouraged.

The Gibraltar Barbary macaques are considered by many to be the top tourist attraction in Gibraltar. The most popular troop is that of Queen's Gate at the Ape's Den, where people can get especially close to the monkeys. They will often approach and sometimes climb onto people, as they are used to human interaction. Nevertheless, they are still wild animals and will bite if frightened or annoyed.

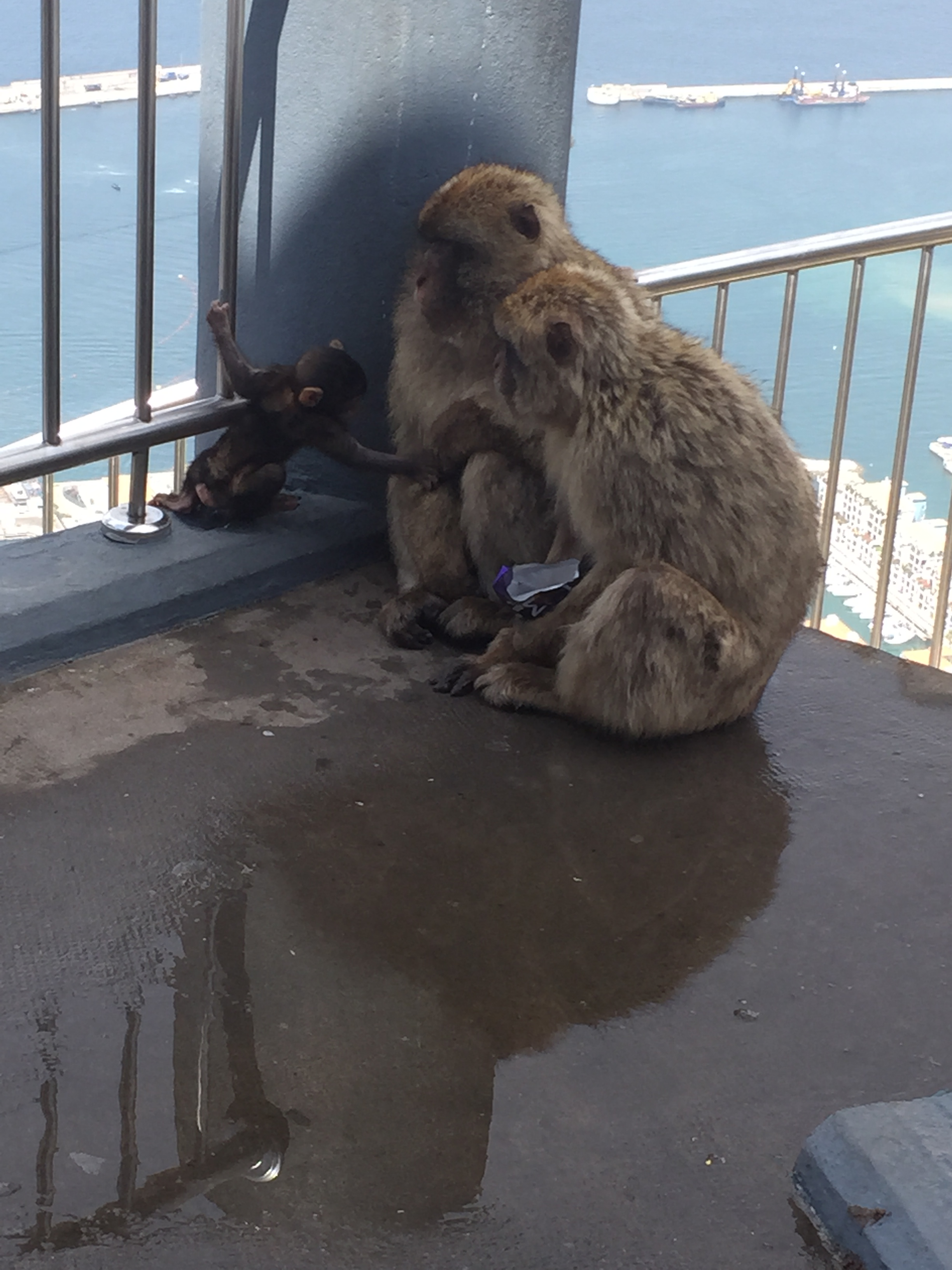
Macaques with a chocolate bar wrapper, having stolen it from a tourist's bag in July 2016

The macaques' contact with large numbers of tourists was causing the integrity of their social groups to break down, as they began to become dependent on humans. This induced the monkeys to forage in the city, resulting in damage to buildings, clothing, and vehicles. Close contact with humans has also led to the macaques learning how to open pockets and unzip handbags and rucksacks in order to steal food from humans. For these reasons, deliberately feeding the macaques in Gibraltar is now an offence punishable by law. Anyone caught feeding the monkeys is liable to be fined up to £4,000.

In 2026 academic researchers concluded that Gibraltar's monkeys had learned to eat soil to counter the gut irritation caused by the consumption of salty and sugary foods, a behaviour known as geophagy.

== Military care ==
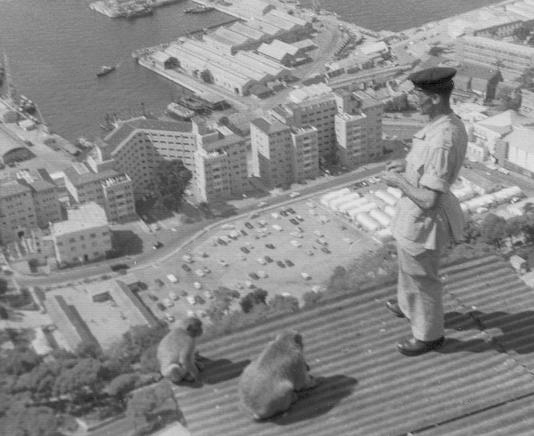
Sgt. Alfred Holmes alongside two Barbary macaques, looking down on the city of Gibraltar

Gibraltar's Barbary macaque population was under the care of the British Army and later the Gibraltar Regiment from 1915 to 1991, who carefully controlled a population that initially consisted of a single troop. The 'Keeper of the Apes' would keep the official records, maintaining an up-to-date register for each monkey, listing their births and names and supervising their diet, which they drew officially every week. The food allowance of fruit, vegetables and nuts was included in the budget, set by the War Office at £4 a month in 1944. They would humorously announce births in the 'Gibraltar Chronicle': "Rock Apes. Births: To Phyllis, wife of Tony, at the Upper Rock, on 30th June 1942 — a child. Both doing well." They were named after governors, brigadiers and high-ranking officers. Any ill or injured monkey needing surgery or any other form of medical attention was taken to Royal Naval Hospital Gibraltar and received the same treatment as would an enlisted service man. When UK-based infantry units were withdrawn and garrison duty was left to the Gibraltar Regiment, the Government of Gibraltar took over responsibility for the monkeys.

=== Officers in charge ===
- Lt Bill Parker of the Royal Artillery (1944 – unknown)
- Major W O Skelton of the Royal Artillery (circa 1951)
- Gunner Wilfred Portlock of the Royal Artillery Regiment (circa 1940 – 1960)
- Sgt Alfred Holmes of the Gibraltar Regiment (circa 1958 – circa 1986)
- Cpl. Ernest Asquez of the Gibraltar Regiment (circa 1986 – 1991)

== Royal visit ==
On 11 May 1954, Queen Elizabeth II and the Duke of Edinburgh visited the monkey packs while on a visit to Gibraltar. A photograph captured the Queen feeding a Barbary ape while the Duke of Edinburgh stood next to battle-dressed ape-keeper Gunner Wilfred Portlock.

== Management ==
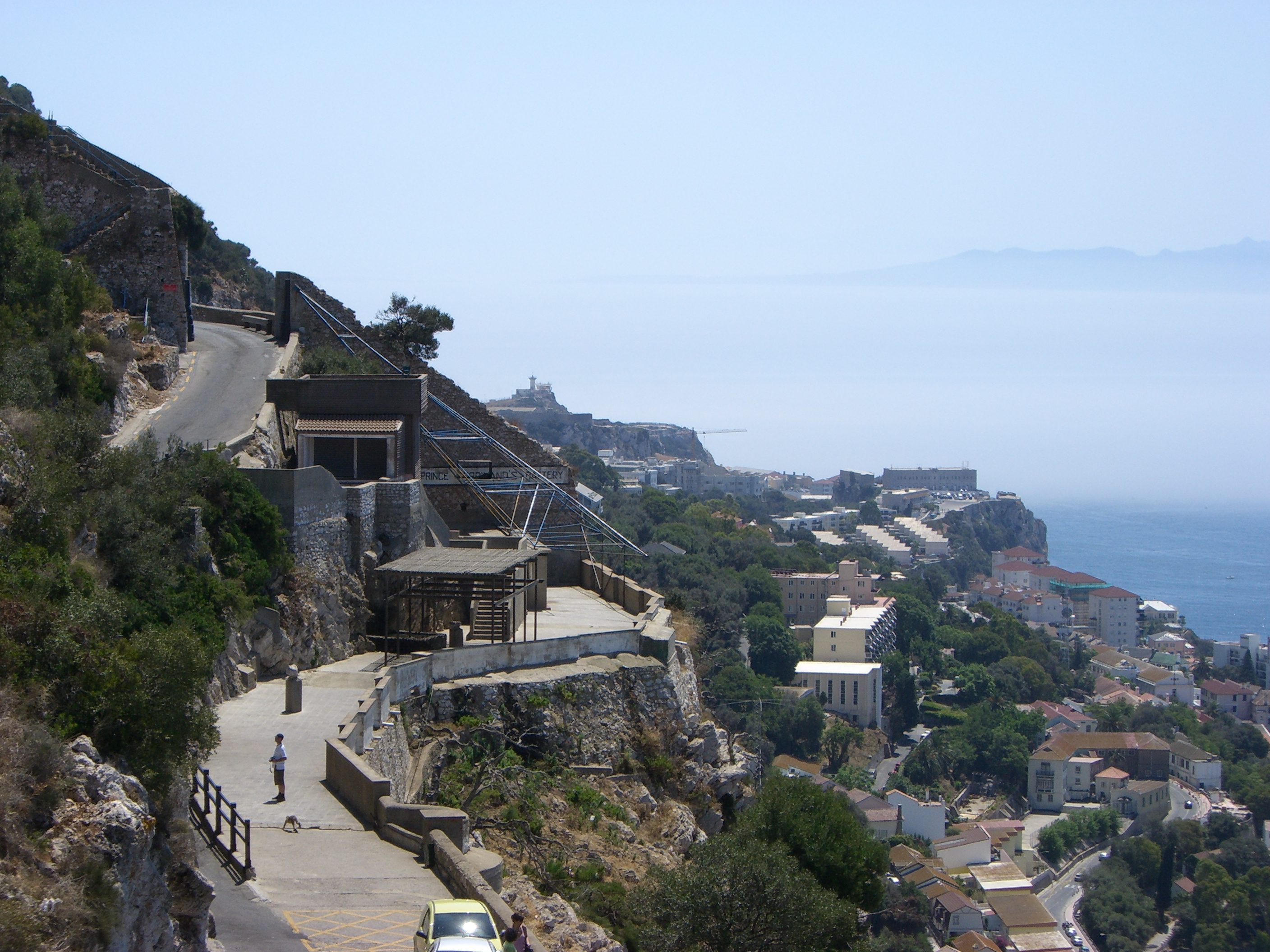
The most popular troop of macaques is based at the Ape's Den area within the Gibraltar Nature Reserve.

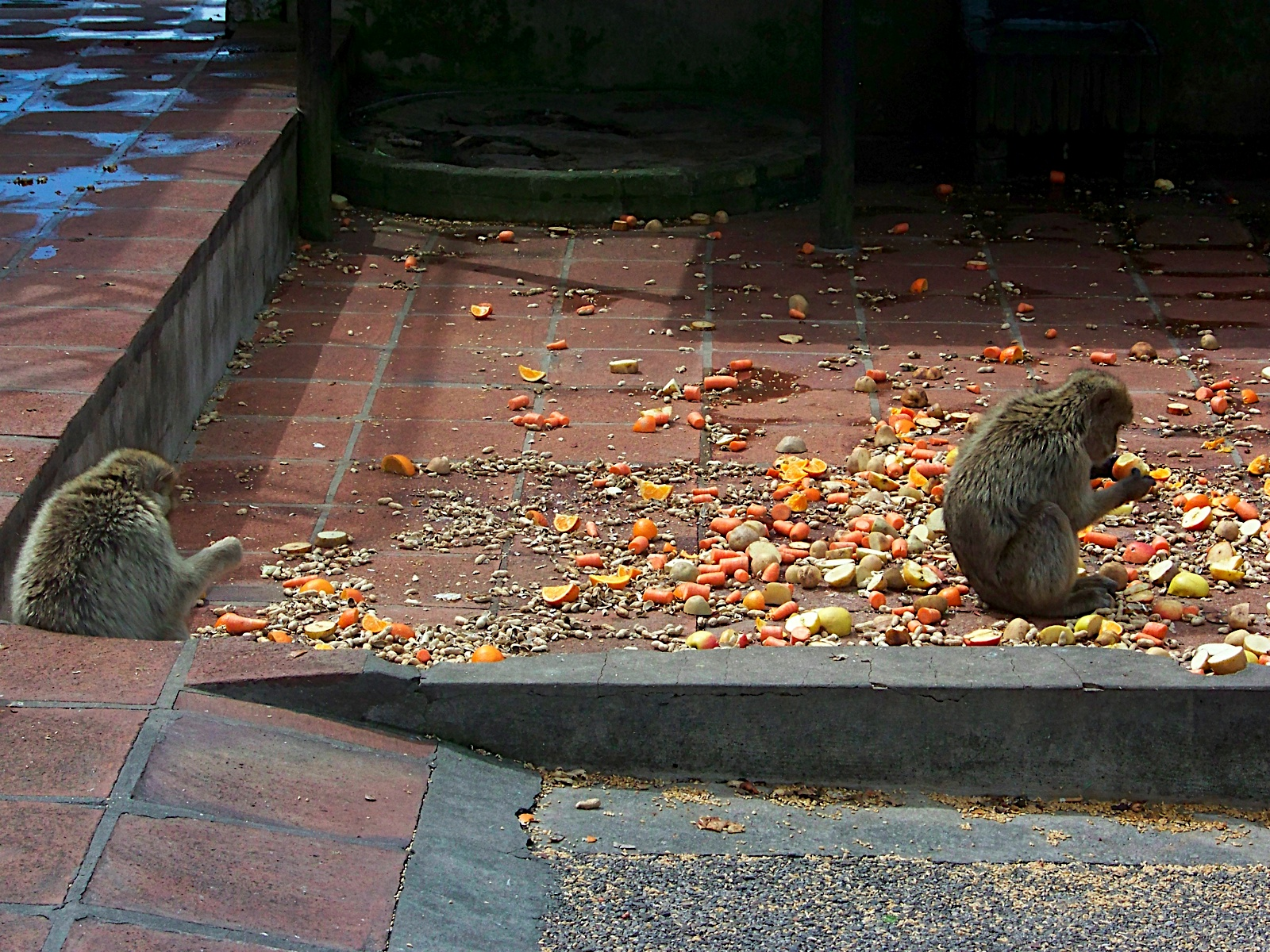
The macaques receive a daily supply of fresh fruit and vegetables including oranges, apples, potatoes, onions, carrots and cabbage to supplement their natural food resources.

The monkeys are currently managed by the Gibraltar Ornithological and Natural History Society (GONHS), and veterinarian expertise is provided by the Gibraltar Veterinary Clinic. The macaques receive a daily supply of fresh water and vegetables, fruit and seeds as supplement to natural food resources (leaves, olives, roots, seeds and flowers). The animals are caught on a regular basis to check their health status. Additionally, body size, weight and several other measurements are taken. Finally, the animals are given a tattoo number and a microchip as a means of identification. But tattoos are not the only way to recognise individual macaques; many of them have particular marks, scars or spots which can be used as distinguishing features. All monkeys are photographed and the pictures and individual characteristics are catalogued. Cataloguing work is carried out by the GONHS. The GONHS also does collaborative studies with the Scientific Institute of Rabat-Agdal University (Morocco), the University of Notre Dame (Indiana, United States), the University of Vienna (Austria), the German Primate Centre (Germany) and the University of Zurich (Switzerland).

Once every year, a census is conducted to provide data and to monitor reproductive success of the whole population. These demographic data are important for the management of the population generally, and fertility regulation in selected individuals, specifically. Since Barbary macaque females reproduce well, the population on Gibraltar is steadily increasing, which in turn puts pressure on the limited habitat. Animal population control is therefore an essential part of the effective management of the population. In 2008 a small group of macaques that had permanently relocated to the Catalan Bay area were culled. In 2012 the Government Minister for Health and the Environment John Cortes stated that the Government was investigating the possibility of reintroducing over a hundred macaques to their natural habitat in North Africa.

In October 2014, the Government of Gibraltar announced that it would export 30 of the monkeys to a safari park in Scotland. This caused a journalist spin that they were sent to Scotland for being especially "disruptive". By 2017, the monkeys at the Blair Drummond Safari Park near Stirling were doing well and the first births were being registered.

== Legend ==
A popular belief holds that as long as Gibraltar Barbary macaques exist on Gibraltar, the territory will remain under British rule. In 1942 (during World War II), after the population dwindled to just seven monkeys, UK Prime Minister Winston Churchill ordered their numbers be replenished immediately from forest fragments in both Morocco and Algeria because of this traditional belief.

In another story, the Gibraltar Barbary macaques entered the Rock via a subterranean passage between Lower St. Michael's Cave and Morocco.

== In popular culture ==
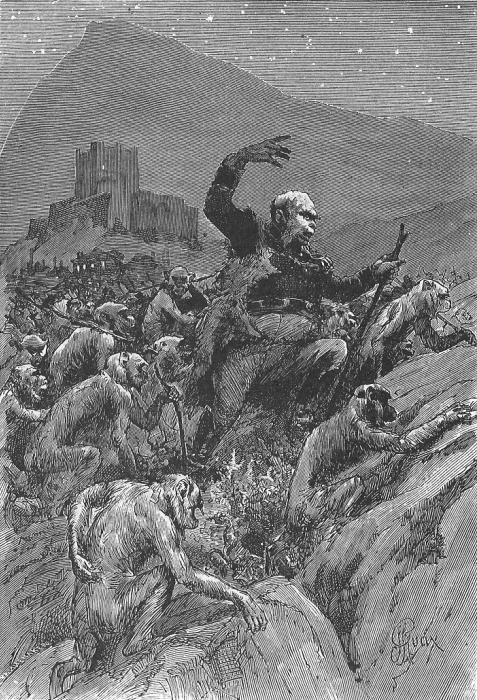
In an 1887 satire by Jules Verne, the Spaniard Gil Braltar invades the rock with a macaque troop after disguising himself as one of them.

- The Gibraltar Barbary macaque is portrayed on the Gibraltar pound's five-pence coin since 1988 and on the tercentenary edition one penny coin since 2004.
- They are featured in the 2007 novel The Girl Who Kicked the Hornets' Nest by Stieg Larsson.
- The Gibraltar Barbary macaques are central to the plot of Paul Gallico's 1962 comedic novel Scruffy and the 1962 British comedy film Operation Snatch, both set during World War II when their numbers were dwindling.
- James Bond (Timothy Dalton) is startled by one in the pre-credit sequence of the 1987 film The Living Daylights during a training exercise on Gibraltar. Several more are seen watching and getting out of the way of Bond's struggle with an assassin on a burning munitions truck as it speeds through the tourist zone.
- They are part of a flashback sequence in The Atlantis Gene by A. G. Riddle.

== See also ==
- List of mammals in Gibraltar
- Ravens of the Tower of London
