= Juan Mateos =

- Born: Gibraltar
- Died: 1594; Gibraltar
- Resting place: Parish church of St. Mary the Crowned (now the Cathedral of St. Mary the Crowned)
- Occupations: Merchant; Innkeeper
- Known for: Founding Gibraltar's first hospital

Juan Mateos (?–1594) was a wealthy inhabitant of Gibraltar during the Spanish period. He was remembered for being the founder of Gibraltar's first hospital, which subsequently became the old St Bernard's Hospital.

== Early life ==
Juan Mateos was a Spanish innkeeper from Gibraltar. He ran an inn at Albalate, in Gibraltar's municipal area, the Campo de Gibraltar. In his youth he was active in defending Gibraltar against the 1540 raid of the corsairs from the Barbary Coast and became famous when he took part in the resistance of one of their landings, killing one of the Berber leaders. Mateos later took advantage of his reputation becoming a successful merchant, amassing a considerable amount of money. He later became the official "Dispenser of Royal Licences", therefore having many opportunities to increase his fortune.

== Gibraltar's first hospital ==
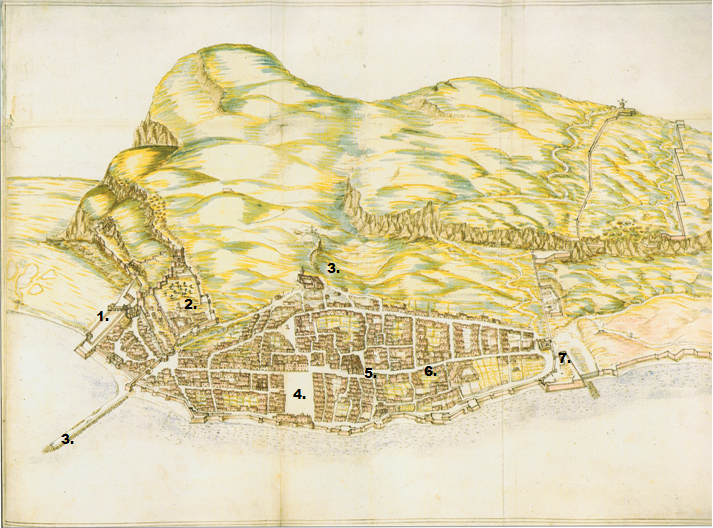
Map of Gibraltar in 1627, by Luis Bravo de Acuña: 1- Puerta de España (now Landport Gate) 2- Castillo (Moorish Castle) 3- Hospital de San Juan de Dios (the old St Bernard's Hospital) 4- Plaza Mayor (now John Mackintosh Square) 5- Iglesia parroquial de Santa María la Coronada y San Bernardo (now the Cathedral of St. Mary the Crowned) 6- Calle Real (now Main Street 7- Puerta de África (now Southport Gates) 8- Muelle Viejo (Old Mole)

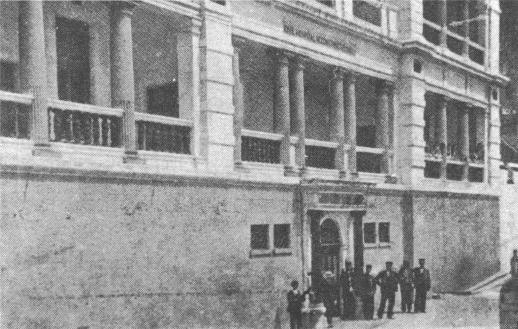
The Civil Hospital on the site of Mateos' home. This remained Gibraltar's main hospital for almost four and a half centuries until its move in 2005.

In 1567 Mateos suddenly changed his way of life by converting his large house in the Upper Town, on the slopes of The Rock, into a 20-bed infirmary, and putting all his fortune towards running the hospital. It was the result of seeing the difficult situation of the poor sick people in the town, and also of the miserable sight of the many ill sailors that arrived in Gibraltar after returning from the New World (many of whom suffered from a virulent form of syphilis, a disease that had had its European outbreak just a century before with ineffective treatment). Mateos' spent almost nothing on himself wearing only sackcloth and eating frugally. He just retained a small room in his former house for himself. For twenty four years, Mateos devoted his time and personal services in support of the charitable institution he had founded. When his fortune was over and he run into debt, he began to beg asking for alms to keep the hospital running. He became well known in the surrounding countryside, with patients coming to him from far and wide. Mateos eventually earned himself a saintly reputation.

In 1591, the Bishop of Cádiz, García de Haro, travelled to Gibraltar (which belonged to the diocese of Cádiz at the time) to pay a visit to Mateos and his renowned foundation. However, he found him so weak and tired "in consequence of much work and fasting" that he had to ask the "Orden de San Juan de Dios" (Spanish: Order of Saint John of God) from Granada (a religious order devoted to the medical care or poor sickmen) to look after the hospital, which begun to be known as the Hospital de San Juan de Dios (Spanish: Hospital of St. John of God). The friars later built a convent and a church close to the hospital. Mateos joined the order himself, maintaining his activities at the hospital, though to a lesser extent. He died three years later, in 1594. He was mourned by all Gibraltar locals and honoured with masses and religious ceremonies for several days after his death. He was buried by the altar of the parish church of St. Mary the Crowned (now the Cathedral of St. Mary the Crowned). The hospital, however, did not disappear along with its founder but continued to not only serve Gibraltar's population, but also the sick for miles around. This was to remain Gibraltar's main hospital until its move in 2005.

== Bibliography ==
- Dr. Cecil Montegriffo (19 August 1978). "History Of Medicine In Gibraltar". The British Medical Journal. 2 (6136): 552–555. doi:10.1136/bmj.2.6136.552. PMC 1606962. PMID 359087.
- López de Ayala, Ignacio (1782). Historia de Gibraltar (in Spanish). Antonio de Sancha. pp. 256–258. "mateos."
- George Fromow (2007). The Legacy of Juan Mateos (documentary highlighting the origins of St Bernard's Hospital, based on historical facts) (DVD). Gibraltar: HighFlyer Production.
