= Gibraltar–Spain border =

International border

Coordinates: 36.154933°N 5.348363°W

- The border, as seen on the map

Characteristics
- Entities: Gibraltar (UK); Spain
- Length: 1.2 kilometres (0.75 mi)

History
- Established: 1704 (de facto); Capture of Gibraltar
- Current shape: 2026; Border fence and controls removed
- Treaties: Treaty of Utrecht, Gibraltar Airport Agreement, UK/EU and EAEC: Agreement in respect of Gibraltar

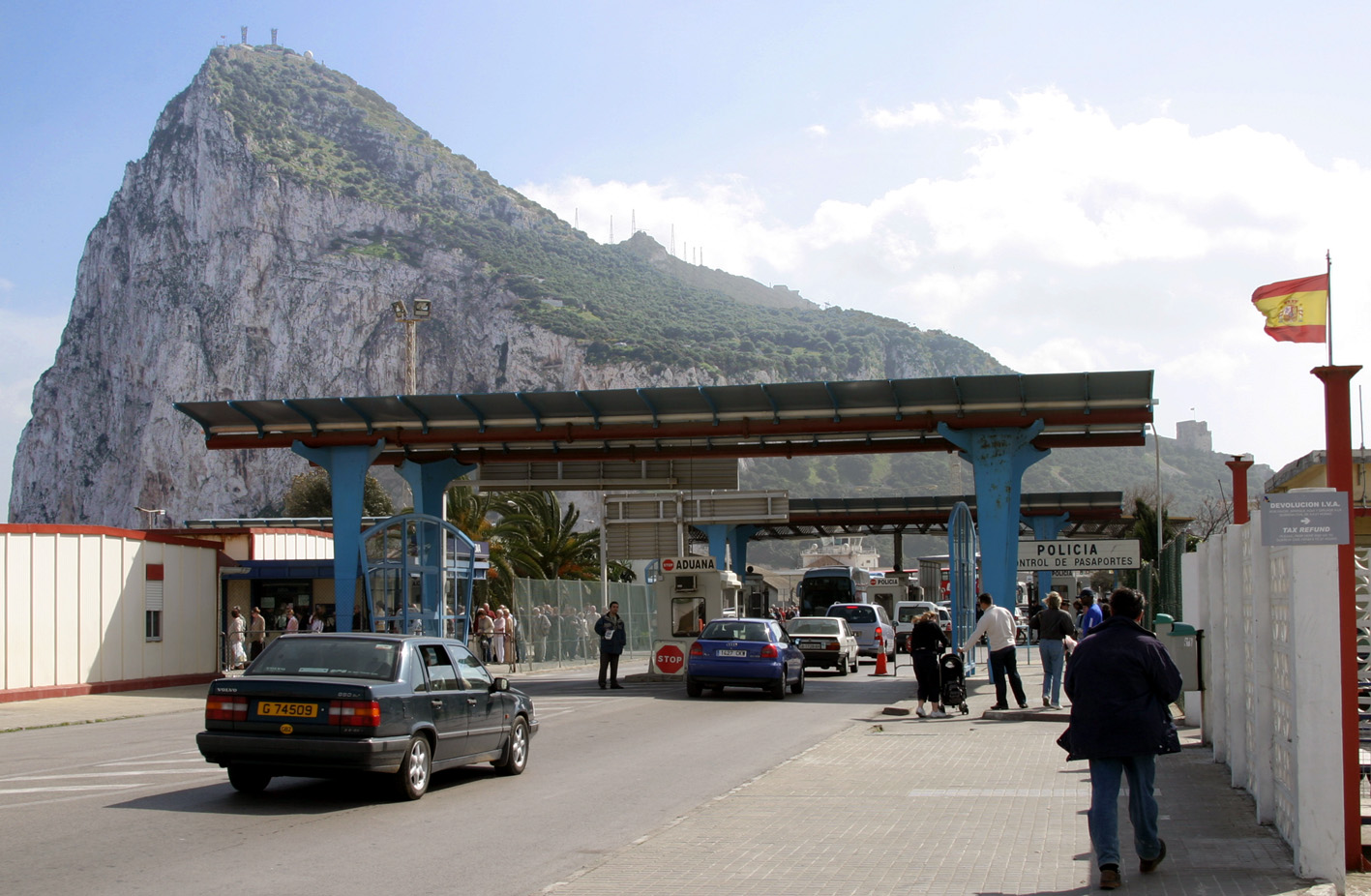
The border, seen from the Spanish side, 2004

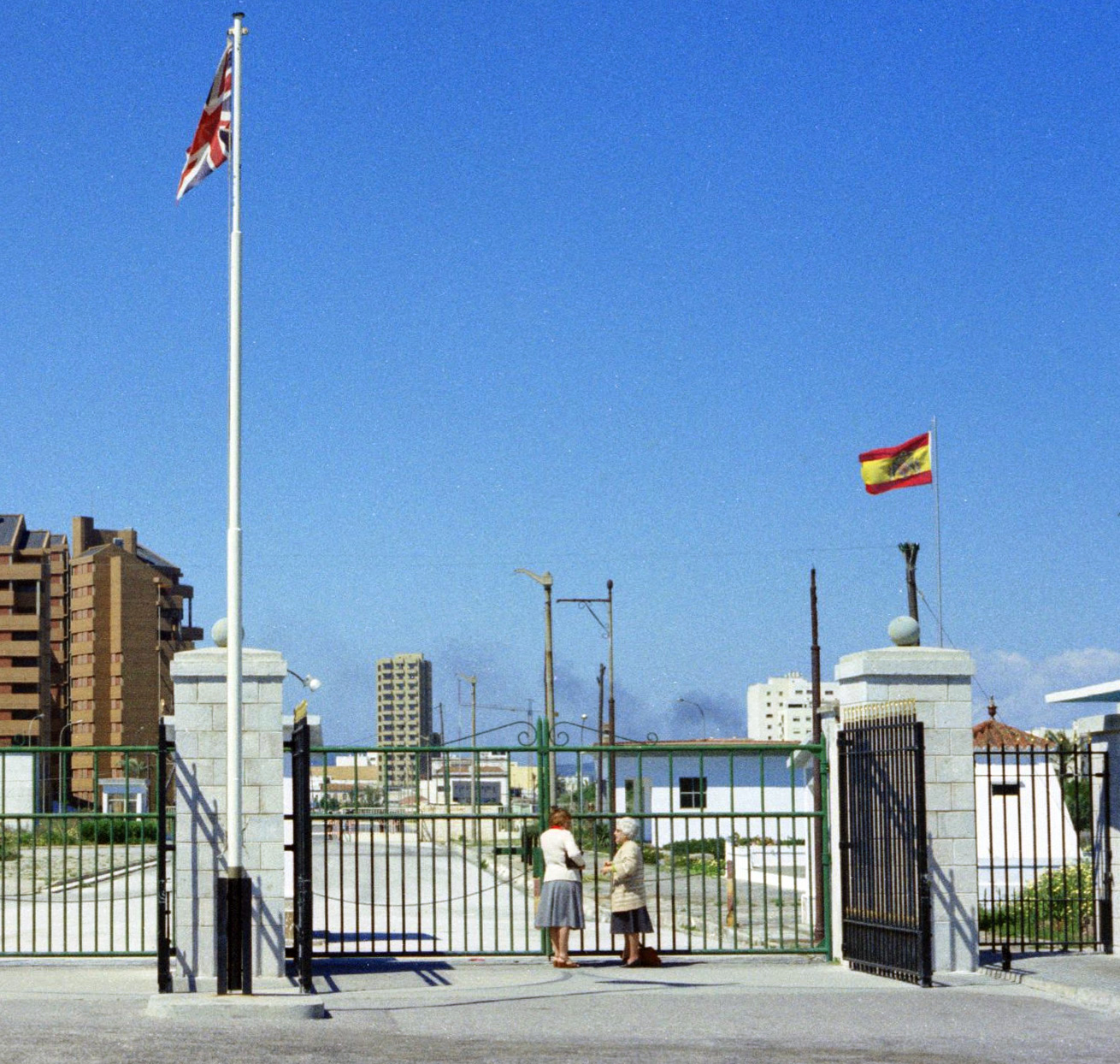
The closed Spanish gate at the border between Gibraltar and Spain, 1977

The Gibraltar–Spain border is the international boundary (Note: The Kingdom of Spain does not accept the current location of the international boundary. See Disputed status of the isthmus between Gibraltar and Spain) between the British Overseas Territory of Gibraltar and the Kingdom of Spain. Until the Schengen-era, it was also referred to as "The Fence of Gibraltar" (Spanish: La verja de Gibraltar) or simply "The Fence". The border runs from east to west for a total of 1.2 kilometres (0.75 mi) separating Gibraltar from the neighbouring Spanish municipality of La Línea de la Concepción. In 1909, a fence was erected at the border by the United Kingdom, establishing the current shape of the border. Since Gibraltar (like the United Kingdom) was outside the European Union's Schengen Area, identity checks were required to cross the border.

On 31 December 2020, an agreement in principle had been agreed between Spain and the United Kingdom, for Gibraltar to become a de facto participant in the EU's Schengen Area while remaining a British Overseas Territory. The arrangements were formalized as part of the 2025 draft "Agreement in respect of Gibraltar between the United Kingdom of Great Britain and Northern Ireland, of the one part, and the European Union and the European Atomic Energy Community, on the other part", which has not been signed, but which is planned to be provisionally applied from 1 April 2026.

On 15 July 2026 at midnight, border controls were removed, ending centuries of closure and immigration and customs facilities were removed. Gibraltar is now treated as part of the Schengen Area.

== History ==
The territory of Gibraltar was ceded to Great Britain in perpetuity under the Treaty of Utrecht in 1713. In 1730, the Lines of Contravallation of Gibraltar were built by Spain to isolate Gibraltar: these lines were north of the isthmus linking Spain with Gibraltar. These lines were the first form of border between Gibraltar and Spain.

During the Peninsular War in the early 19th century, Spain had initially sided with the First French Empire while trying to invade the Kingdom of Portugal, but France shortly afterwards turned on its ally, thus forcing Spain to side itself with the United Kingdom and Portugal against the French Empire. The Lines of Contravallation were blown up by the Gibraltar Commanding Royal Engineer Charles Holloway, with permission from Spain on 14 February 1810, to avoid them falling into the hands of the approaching French. Gibraltar, supported by La Línea, became an important base for Spanish fighters against Napoleon's troops. Currently, all that remains of the Lines of Contravallation are the Ruins of Fort St. Barbara, which is being restored, while remnants of the Fort San Felipe have appeared recently. Fort San Carlos does not seem to have left preserved evidence.

In 1909 the United Kingdom decided to reduce the number of sentries and built a fence 7 feet (2.1 m) high, however there was suspicion about the motives for doing so. The line of this fence eventually became the de facto border. Spain claims that, by building the fence where it did, the United Kingdom annexed 106 of the original 156 hectares of neutral ground. The Gibraltar International Airport was built at this location.

Spanish leader Francisco Franco ordered the closure of the border gate on 8 June 1969 in response to the Gibraltar Constitution Order 1969. The border at La Línea remained closed for more than 13 years until it was partially reopened to Spanish and Gibraltarian pedestrians on 15 December 1982, and was fully reopened to motor vehicles on 5 February 1985 in preparation for Spain joining the European Communities in 1986.

== Status of the isthmus ==
Spain continues to dispute the sovereign status of the isthmus with the United Kingdom, specifically the territory where Gibraltar International Airport stands, in addition to a broader dispute about the status of Gibraltar as a whole. One of the sources of the dispute is the lack of appropriate definitions of what had been actually ceded to Great Britain in the Treaty of Utrecht. The Treaty did not include any map or specific description of the ceded elements, so that Article X is subject to different interpretations from each side. According to Article X of the Treaty of Utrecht, dominion is ceded over the town and castle of Gibraltar, together with the port, fortifications, and forts thereunto belonging.

== Customs and identity checks ==
Until 15 July 2026, Customs and identity checks on the Spanish side of the border were carried out by the Spanish Civil Guard and the Spanish National Police. Customs and identity checks on the Gibraltar side of the border were carried out by HM Customs Gibraltar and the Gibraltar Borders and Coastguard Agency.

On 28 December 2020, Spain's foreign minister Arancha González Laya announced that cross-border workers who commute between Gibraltar and Spain will be exempt from Spanish border controls after Brexit, even if no agreement on free movement is reached with the United Kingdom.

=== Congestion charge ===
In 2010, the People's Party mayor of La Línea, Alejandro Sánchez, attempted to impose a "congestion charge" on people entering or leaving Gibraltar, despite having been told by the Spanish Government that such a charge would be a breach of national and EU law.

=== Territorial waters dispute ===
In July 2013, the Gibraltar Government placed a number of concrete blocks in the sea off the coast of Gibraltar, intending to form an artificial reef. The Spanish Government protested, stating that it harmed fishing in the area, restricting access for Spanish fishing vessels. At the end of July the Spanish Government introduced extra border checks for people going in and out of the territory into Spain. The British Government protested as the checks were causing major delays of up to seven hours while people waited to cross the border, and on 2 August the Spanish ambassador was summoned to the British Foreign and Commonwealth Office in London to explain these developments.

== Maritime borders ==
The Gibraltar Port Authority controls the territorial waters of Gibraltar that border Spain's.

== Important treaties ==
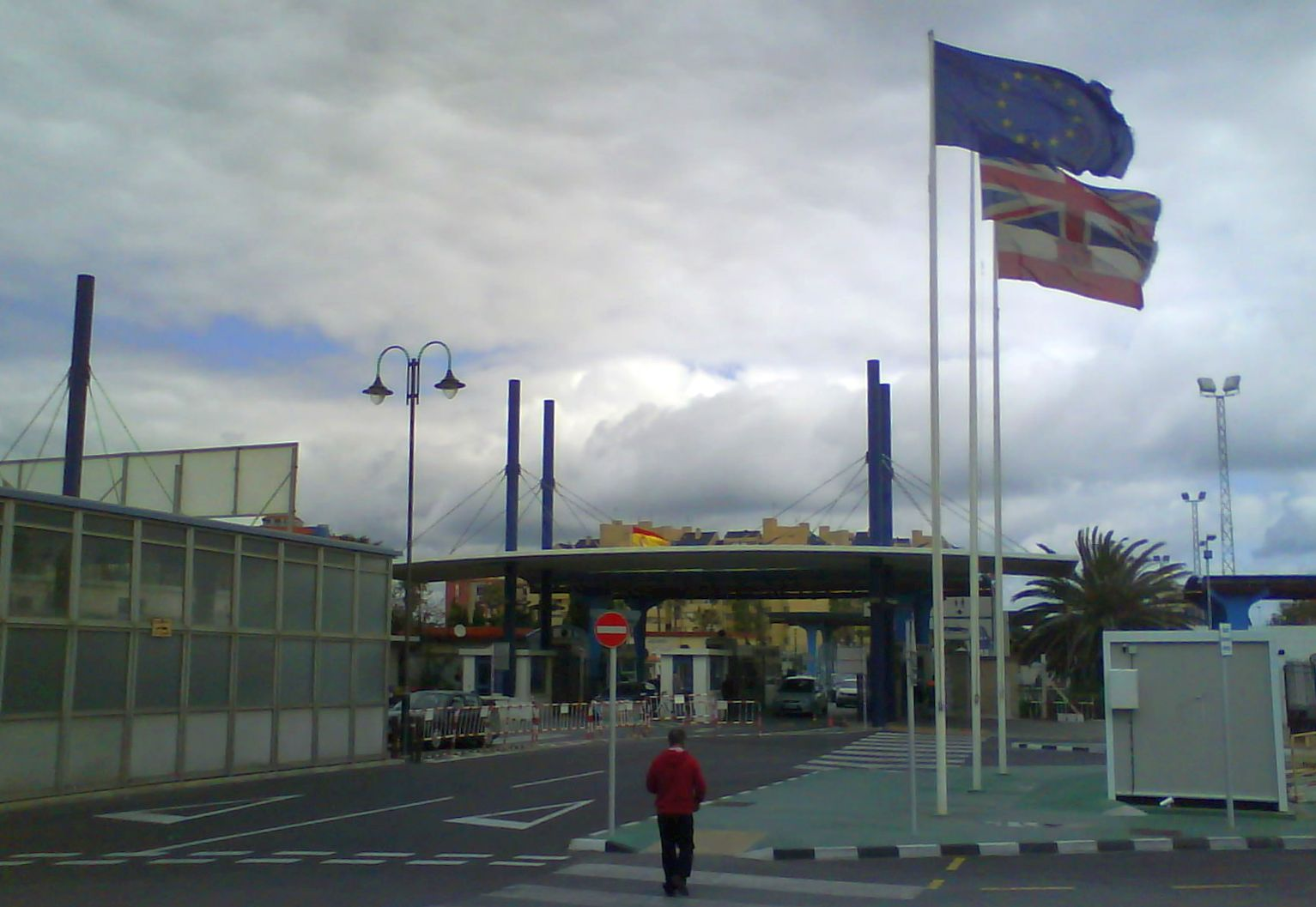
The border, as seen from the British side, before Brexit, 2009

- Treaty of Utrecht (1713) – The Spanish Crown formally ceded the territory in perpetuity to the British Crown in 1713, under Article X of the Treaty of Utrecht.
- Brexit, the withdrawal of UK from the EU in 2020, might affect the Gibraltar–Spain border. There is a plan to include Gibraltar in the Schengen Area, removing all border checks at the Gibraltar–Spain border, but strengthening the control at air travel from UK, it became reality in 2026. See also Effect of Brexit on Gibraltar.
- UK/EU and EAEC: Agreement in respect of Gibraltar in 2026, signed between the EU, Spain, and the UK, allows Gibraltar to be in the Schengen Area and permits free passage between Gibraltar and Spain.

== See also ==
- Effect of Brexit on Gibraltar
- Disputed status of Gibraltar
- Ceuta border fence
- Melilla border fence
