= St Bernard's Hospital =

- Gibraltar Health Authority

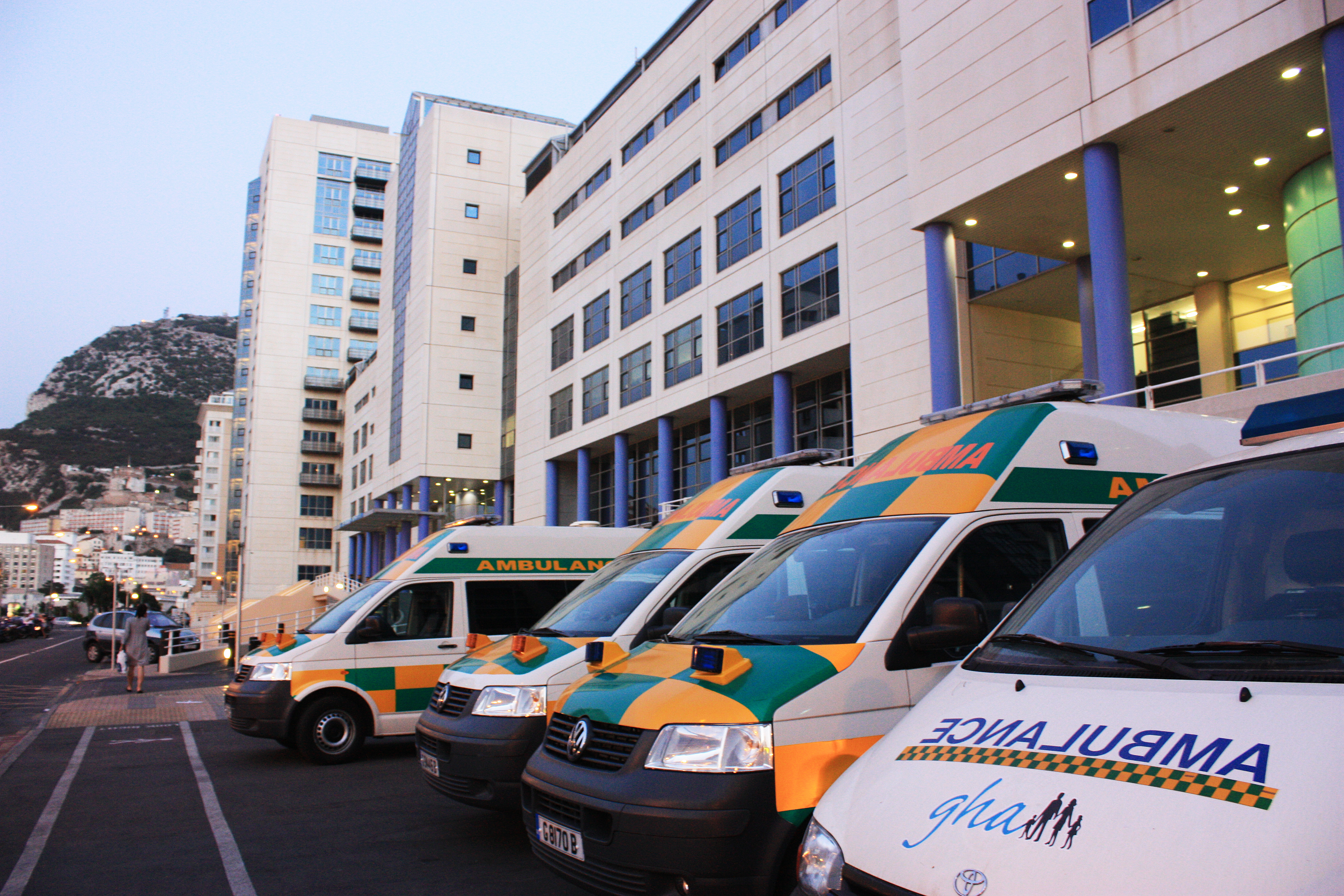
- Gibraltar Health Authority ambulances parked outside St Bernard's Hospital

- Shown in Gibraltar

Geography
- Location: Blocks 1-4 Europort, Europort Avenue, Gibraltar
- Coordinates: 36.143405°N 5.359491°W

Organisation
- Care system: Social health insurance
- Type: District General
- Affiliated university: Kingston University

Services
- Emergency department: Yes
- Beds: Approx. 210

History
- Founded: 1567

Links
- Lists: Hospitals in Gibraltar

St Bernard's Hospital is the only public hospital and teaching hospital in the British overseas territory of Gibraltar.

== History ==
=== Juan Mateos ===
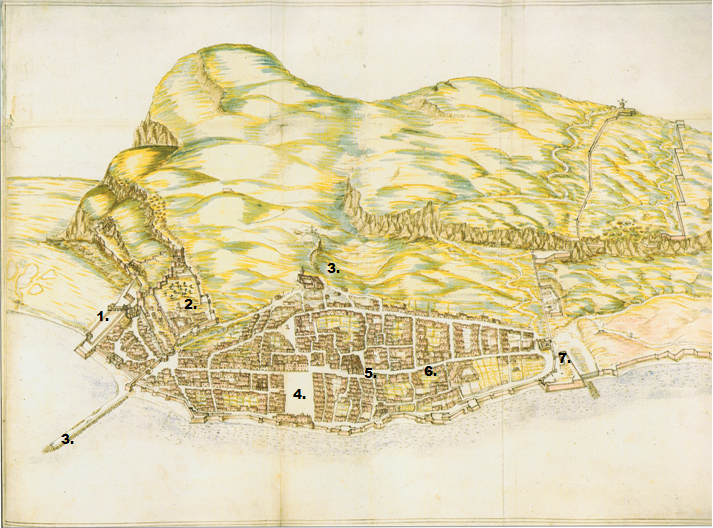
Map of Gibraltar in 1627, by Luis Bravo de Acuña: 1- Puerta de España 2- Tower of Homage 3- Hospital de San Juan de Dios (current St Bernard's Hospital) 4- Plaza Mayor (current John Mackintosh Square) 5- Iglesia parroquial de Santa María la Coronada y San Bernardo 6- Calle Real (current Main Street 7- Puerta de África (current Southport Gates) 8- Muelle Viejo (Old Mole)

In 1567, during Gibraltar's Spanish period, a retired Spanish innkeeper by the name of Juan Mateos converted his house into a 20-bed hospital. He continued to nurse locals and sailors from this location for over 20 years before running into debt, as a result of which he transferred the hospital to the "Orden de San Juan de Dios" (Spanish: Order of Saint John of God). He joined the order himself until his death in 1594, when he was mourned by all the locals. By 1691, the hospital became known as the "Hospital de San Juan de Dios" (English: Saint John of God Hospital), an isolation hospital.

=== Military hospital ===
The existing Spanish hospital in Gibraltar was taken over by the British authorities as a military hospital after the Anglo-Dutch capture of Gibraltar in August 1704 and repaired and refurbished by the Lieutenant Governor Col. Richard Kane. It was initially a naval hospital, but was used during the 1727 siege by the Army, and was returned to the Navy in 1728. With the building of the Naval Hospital in 1746, it became the Garrison Hospital, but by 1756 it was being used as a Barracks, later known as the Blue Barracks, where the Company of Military Artificers (later the Royal Engineers) was formed in 1776.

=== The New Civil Hospital ===
Much of the building fell into ruins after it was severely damaged by Franco-Spanish bombardment during the Great Siege of Gibraltar, and it was not until 1815 that it was extensively rebuilt under the auspices of the then Governor of Gibraltar Sir George Don, as a civil hospital for the local population. It served as a war hospital for injured soldiers in the Mediterranean, and many received aid here in the 1830s.

=== The Colonial Hospital ===
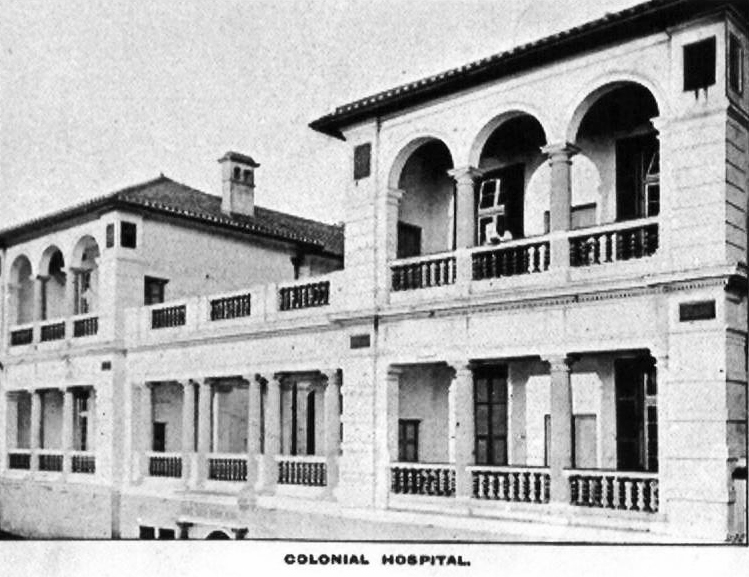
Façade of the old Colonial Hospital in the late 19th century.

It was rebuilt in 1882, and the elegant façade can still be seen, partly obscured by further extensions and additions over the years including the King George VI Wing in front of the hospital in the 1950s and the Mackintosh Wing in the 1970s. In 2005 St Bernard's Hospital moved to its new home in Europort, and over four centuries of history came to an end.

== New St Bernard's ==
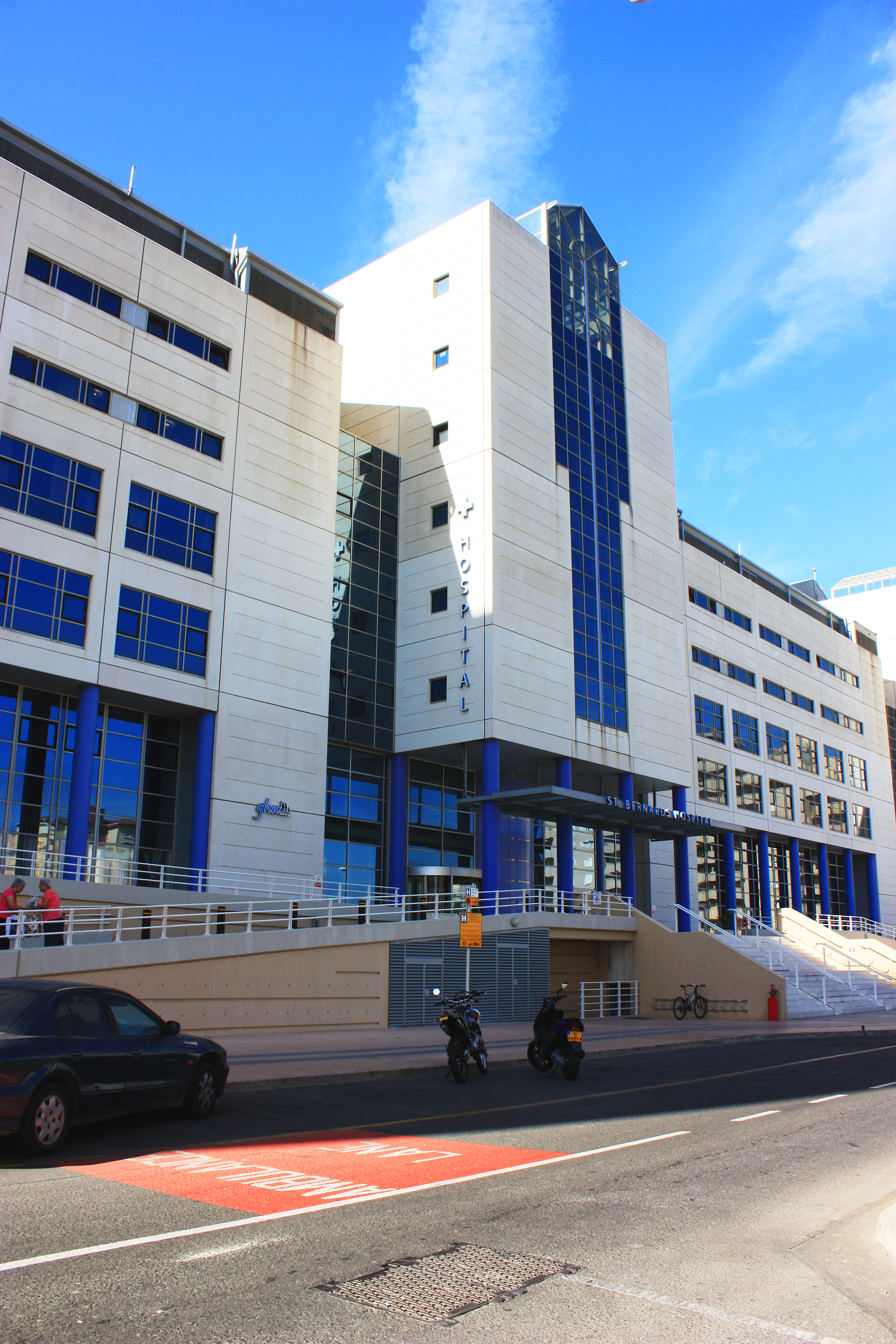
Main entrance to the new St Bernard's Hospital at Europort.

The new St Bernard's Hospital, constructed by converting an existing office block at Europort (three times the size of the old hospital), represented a £60,000,000 plus investment in health for current and future generations. Most of the other improvements in secondary care have been made possible by this modern medical facility which contains nearly £6 million of new medical equipment.

Work on the project commenced on 8 July 2002 involving radically altering the inner areas of the existing Buildings 1–4, to adapt them to the needs of a modern hospital.

The hospital is operated by the Gibraltar Health Authority, a department of the Government of Gibraltar with the purpose of providing health care to the residents of Gibraltar.

The hospital is designed for some 210 beds covering ortho trauma, maternity, surgical, medical and paediatric wards, two main operating theatres and an emergency back up theatre, a hydrotherapy pool with a full rehabilitation clinic, day surgery unit and cardiac rehabilitation, accident and emergency department with provision for major and minor incidents and ophthalmic clinics. There is a modern mortuary with much-improved waiting and viewing facilities adjacent to a new chapel. The present School of Health Studies has relocated from Bleak House at Europa Point to a dedicated area in Block 3 and the office of the Chief Executive and the administrative staff has moved from Johnstone's Passage to Block 1.

== Gallery ==
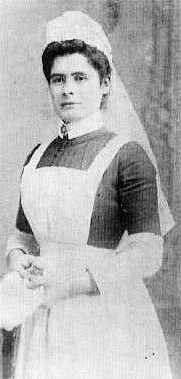
Sister Constance Worthington of the old Colonial Hospital (1891).

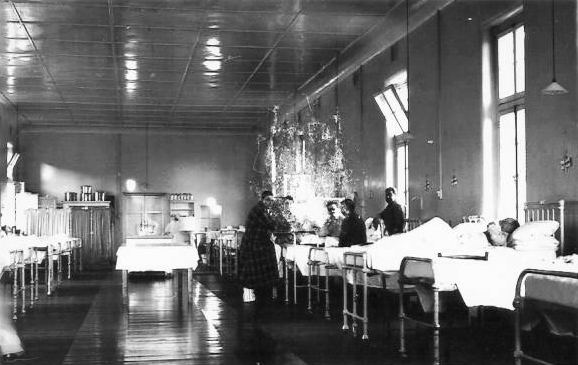
A typical ward at the old Colonial Hospital (20th century).

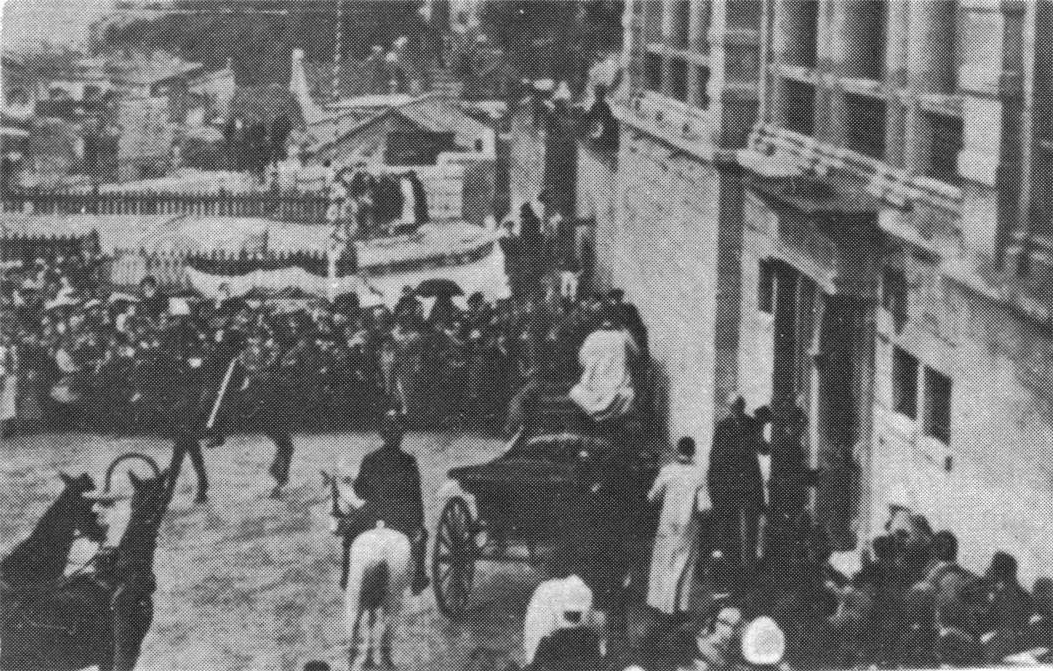
King George entering the Colonial Hospital in Gibraltar during his royal visit (1935).

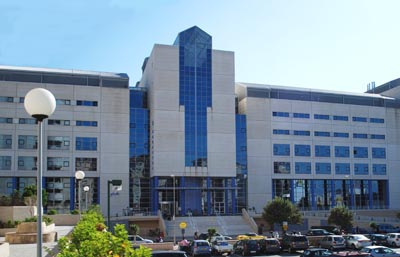
The façade of the new St Bernard's Hospital at Europort (2008).
