= Lines of Contravallation of Gibraltar =

Set of fortifications

- Línea de Contravalación de Gibraltar
- Part of Fortifications of Gibraltar
- La Línea de la Concepción, San Roque, Spain
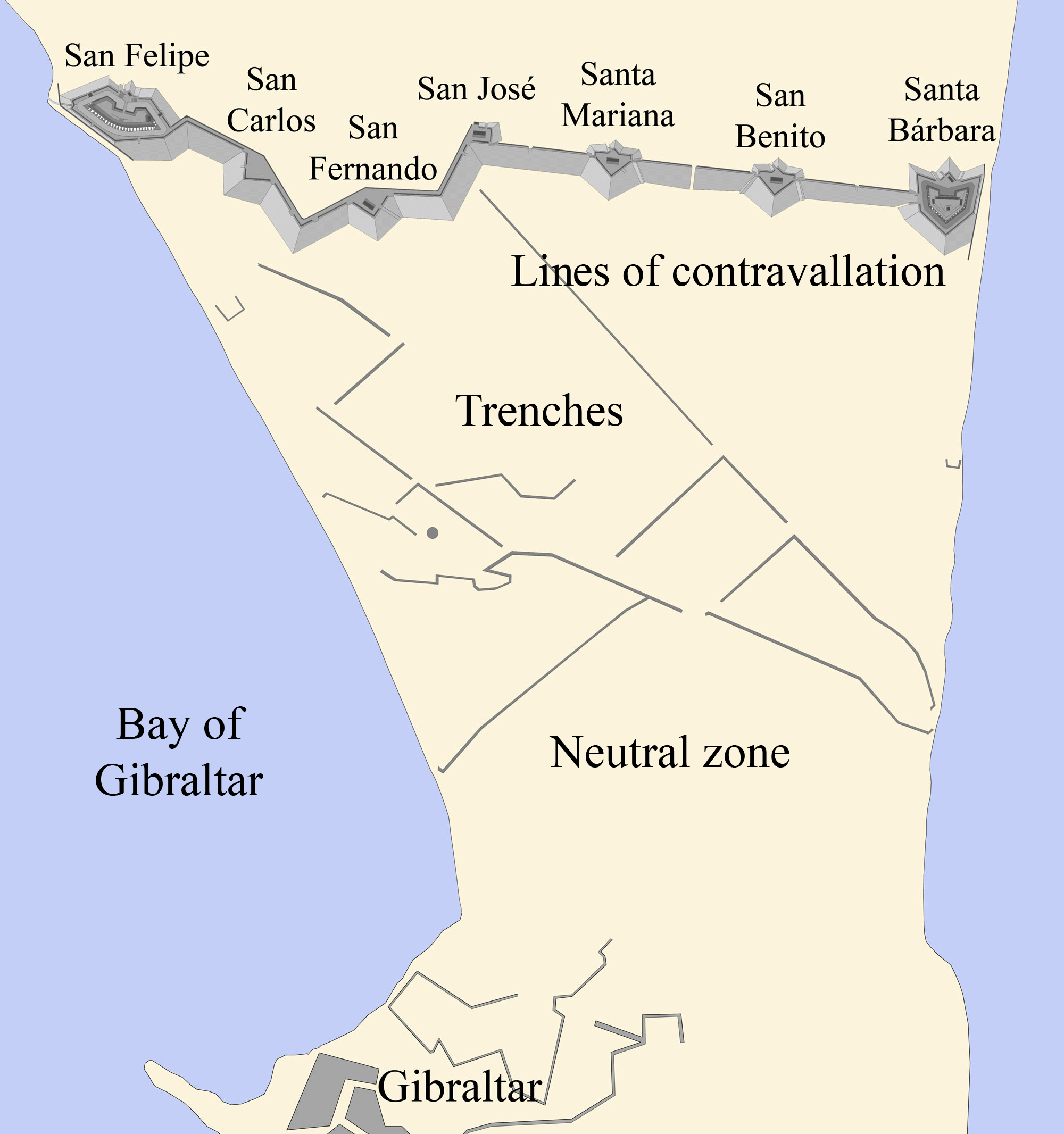
- Spanish Lines at the time of the Great Siege of Gibraltar (1779–83)

Site information
- Type: Forts and defensive wall
- Owner: Ayuntamiento of La Línea de la Concepción
- Open to the public: Yes
- Condition: Fragmentary ruins

Location
- Location of the Spanish lines in La Línea de la Concepción
- Location within Gibraltar
- Coordinates: 36.160148°N 5.345666°W

Site history
- Built: 1730
- Built by: Marquis of Verboom
- Materials: Stone
- Demolished: 14 February 1810
- Battles/wars: Great Siege of Gibraltar

The Lines of Contravallation of Gibraltar (Spanish: Línea de Contravalación de Gibraltar or Línea de Gibraltar), known in English as the "Spanish Lines", were a set of fortifications built by the Spanish across the northern part of the isthmus linking Spain with Gibraltar. They later gave their name to the Spanish town of La Línea de la Concepción. The Lines were constructed after 1730 to establish a defensive barrier across the peninsula, with the aim of preventing any British incursions, and to serve as a base for fresh Spanish attempts to retake Gibraltar. They played an important role in the Great Siege of Gibraltar between 1779 and 1783 when they supported the unsuccessful French and Spanish assault on the British-held fortress. The siege was ended after the lines of contravallation were attacked by British and Dutch forces under the command of the Governor of Gibraltar, General Augustus Eliot. The attack caused the Spanish forces to retreat and abandon the fortifications and the combined British led forces virtually destroyed all the Spanish gun batteries and the enemy cannon and munitions either captured or destroyed. This attack is still commemorated to this day and is known as 'Sortie Day'.

Only 25 years later they were effectively abandoned by the Spanish as the Peninsular War recast France as Spain's enemy and Britain as its ally. Stripped of guns, stores and garrison, which were sent elsewhere to bolster Spanish resistance against French forces, the Lines were demolished by the British in February 1810 with the permission of the Spanish as a French army approached. Although Napoleon had no intention of attacking Gibraltar, the British feared that the Lines could be used to support a French siege against the territory. The modern town of La Línea de la Concepción was subsequently established amidst the ruins of the fortifications, of which only a few fragmentary remains can be seen today.

== Construction ==
Following the Anglo-Dutch capture of Gibraltar in 1704 and the subsequent Twelfth Siege of Gibraltar, in which the Spanish and their French allies sought unsuccessfully to recover the territory, the Spanish built a permanent line of fortifications facing south across the isthmus. Construction began in November 1730 under the Marquis of Verboom with the intention that the lines would block any British invasion of Spanish territory mounted from Gibraltar, act as a starting point for any future Spanish operations against Gibraltar, and cut off access to the territory by land. The lines covered a distance of 950 toises (1,900 yards (1,700 m)) and were built 1,000 toises (2,000 yards (1,800 m)) from the Rock of Gibraltar, where the British defences began.

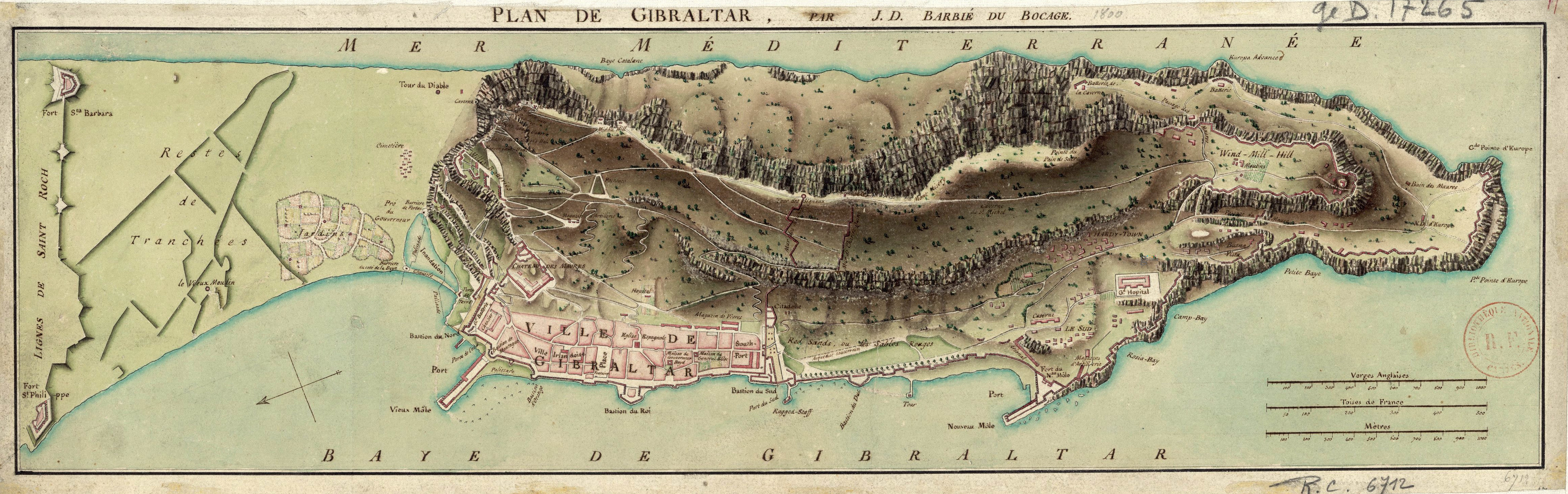
Map of Gibraltar in 1799 by Jean-Denis Barbié du Bocage, showing the Lines (far left) in relation to Gibraltar (centre and right) (north is to the left)

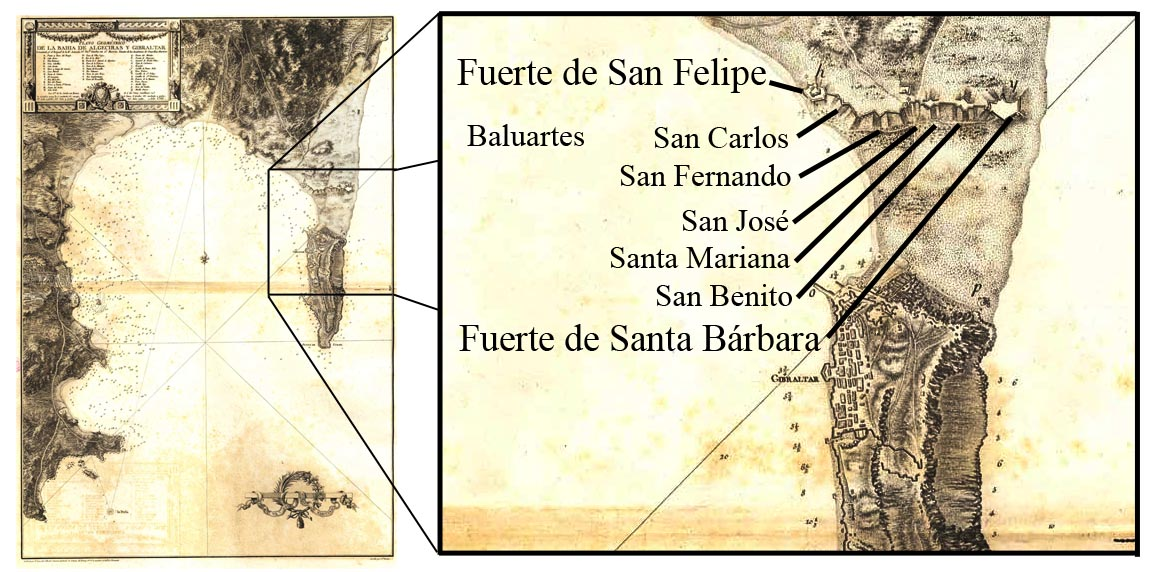
Situation of these forts and bastions on a map of the 18th century.

This sparked a diplomatic dispute between Britain and Spain. During the negotiations that led to the Treaty of Utrecht of 1713, under which Spain ceded Gibraltar to Britain, the British government sought to compel the Spanish to cede "a convenient quantity of land round Gibraltar, viz., to the distance of two cannon shot ... which is absolutely necessary for preventing all occasions of dispute between the Garrison and the Country ..." The Spanish government adamantly refused and would agree only to cede "the town and castle of Gibraltar, together with the port, fortifications and forts thereto belonging", explicitly rejecting any suggestion that Britain had any claim over the isthmus. It also insisted there would be no "open communication by land with the country round about."

When work began on the Lines of Contravallation, the British again asserted that "although territorial jurisdiction was not ceded with the Fortress of Gibraltar by the Treaty of Utrecht, it is a recognised maxim and a constant usage in favour of fortified places, that the ground commended by their cannon pertains to them ..." Once again the Spanish rejected this; the Spanish Secretary of State, the Marquis de la Paz, replied to a British démarche to point out that the "cannon shot rule" had not been agreed in the treaty, and that in any case "the ordinary range of cannon is 200 to 250 toises and the line is set more than 600 toises' distance from the fortress". He noted that in fact the Spanish could have built the lines nearer to the fortress but "in order to maintain good relations [His Majesty] has sought to banish the not well founded misgivings of England, by causing the line to be taken back to the place where it is now situate[d]". The building works continued despite British protests that it was a hostile act and demands, which the Spanish ignored, that the lines should be removed to a distance of 5,000 yards from the fortress walls.

== Layout ==
The Spanish lines consisted of a continuous series of fortifications anchored at either end by two substantial forts. Lieutenant Colonel Thomas James of the Royal Artillery, writing in his 1771 History of the Herculean Straits, provided a detailed description of each of the forts and bastions.

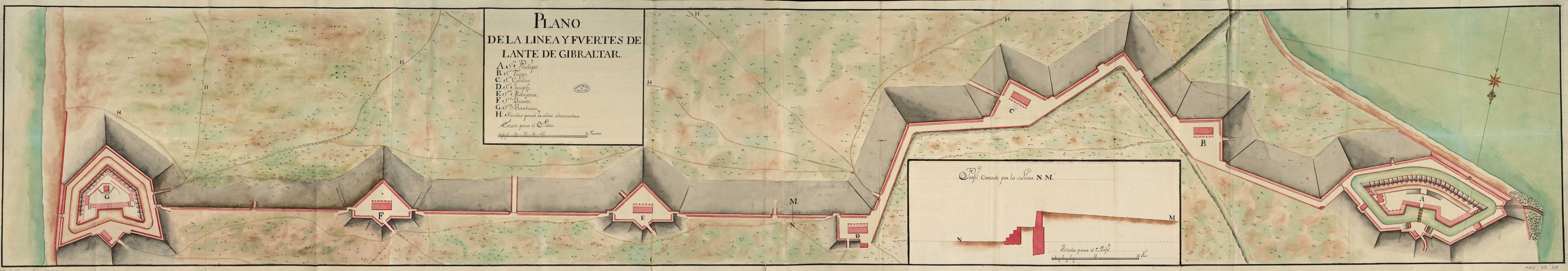
Plan of the Lines as of 1749 (north is to the bottom). Fort St. Barbara is on the left-hand side of the map, and Fort St. Philip is on the right-hand side. In between are the bastions of Santiago, San Carlos, San José, Santa Mariana and San Benito.

Views from the Lines
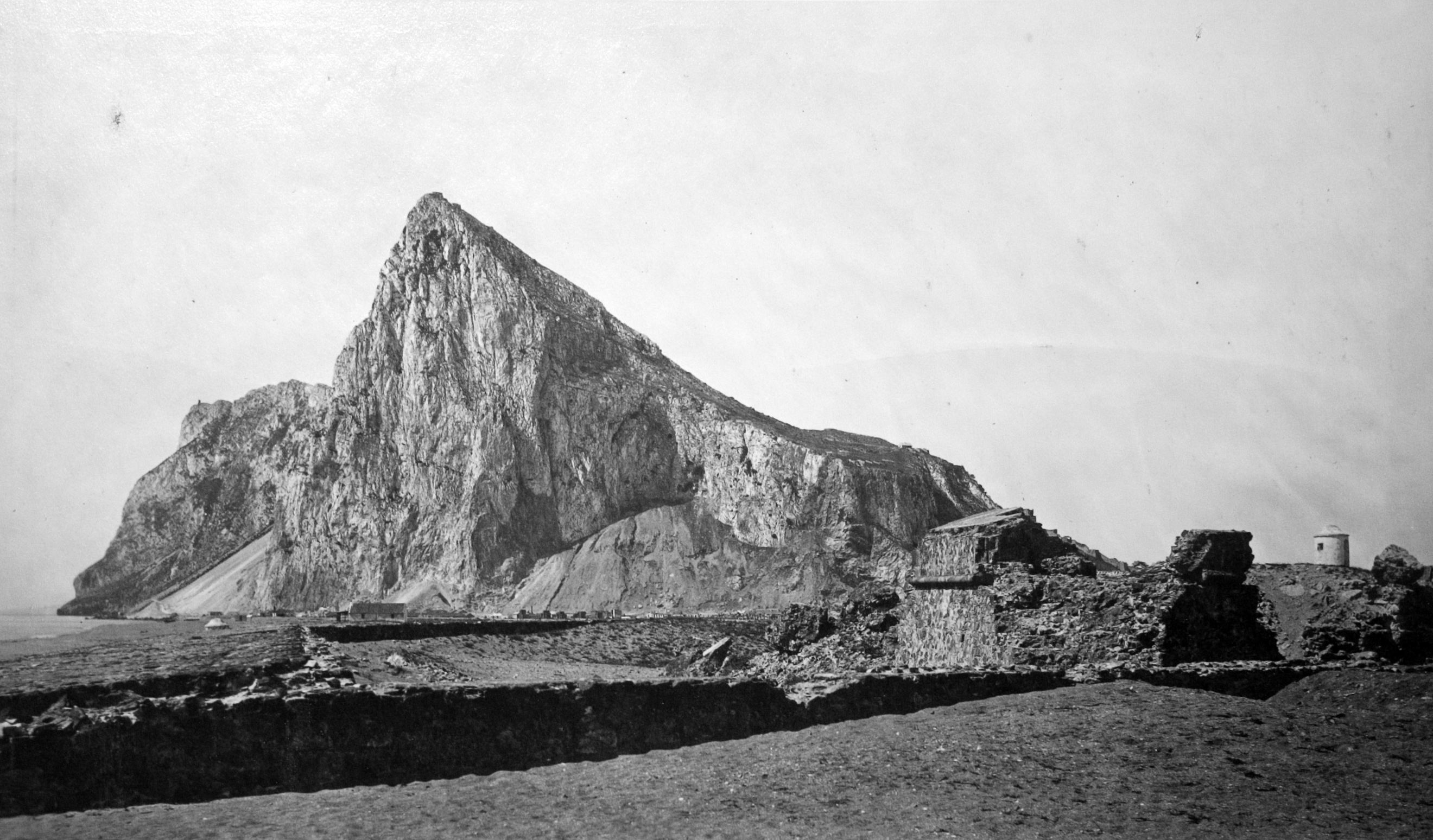
View of the east side of Gibraltar from Fort Santa Bárbara

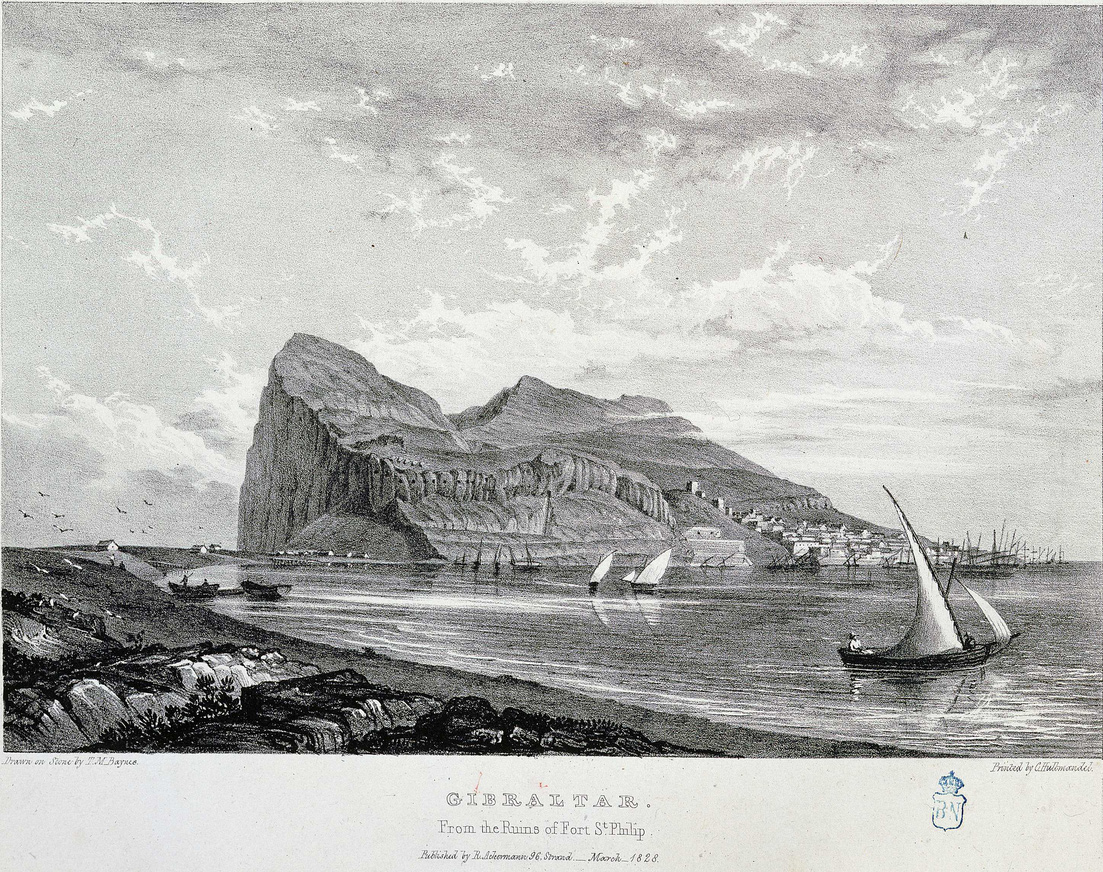
View of the west side of Gibraltar from Fort San Felipe

At the west end, Fort San Felipe (Spanish: Fuerte de San Felipe) had 28 gun positions with a ditch and a bastion trace in the gorge (rear) of the fort. Its broad structure gave the Spanish gunners a wide arc of fire across the Bay of Gibraltar and provided a direct line of fire into the town and the British Devil's Tongue Battery located along the Old Mole. According to James, "the parapet is eighteen feet thick, faced with stone, and filled with earth and clay." It was "mounted with twenty iron sixteen pounders, and four iron six pounders in flanks, with four thirteen inch brass mortars : eighteen of these guns command the anchoring place and their strand, the other six open on the town, and neck of land". Several casemates were situated under the ramparts. Two demi-bastions and a curtain wall were situated at the rear of the fort while storehouses and guard-houses stood alongside it. A solid stone sea wall ran along the east side of the fort. A ditch, filled from the sea and controlled via a sluice gate, provided an additional obstacle. According to James, the normal garrison of the fort was one captain, one subaltern and fifty men, though it could accommodate six hundred.

Fort Santa Barbára (Spanish: Fuerte de Santa Barbára) stood at the eastern end of the line. Its pentagonal structure was aimed like an arrowhead south at Gibraltar and supported 24 gun positions, with a bastion trace in the gorge, a dry ditch, a covered way and a glacis. The two eastern sides of the fort looked out over the Mediterranean Sea, while the south-facing side enfiladed part of the eastern side of Gibraltar and the isthmus. James recorded that its rampart was "thirty feet broad, and mounted with twelve iron fifteen pounders, and one thirteen inch brass mortar." It had a considerably stronger rear than San Felipe as the rampart was continued at the same thickness around the entire circumference of the fort. There were four large bombproof casemates under the ramparts and, as at San Felipe, a sea wall held back the waves. The peacetime garrison of the fort was the same as at San Felipe, with one captain, one subaltern and fifty men.

In between the two forts, the line of fortifications took the form of a continuous redan line, with a curtain wall interrupted by a series of triangular bastions. The lines were constructed in a straight line at the eastern end but bulged out at the western end, where it was intended to build an entrenched camp to hold an army while it prepared to launch an attack on Gibraltar, though the rear portion of this structure was never completed. The five bastions were named (in order from west to east) after St. James (Santiago), St. Charles (San Carlos), St. Joseph (San José), Saint Mariana (Santa Mariana) and Saint Benedict (San Benito).

== Use ==
The Lines played an active role in support of the Spanish campaign during the Great Siege of Gibraltar (1779–1783). The first hostile shot of the siege was fired by one of Fort St. Barbara's guns against a British ship in the Bay of Gibraltar on 11 July 1779. The Spanish subsequently began to strengthen the Lines and dig trenches leading out from them across the isthmus towards the Rock. A number of traverses were built within the two forts at either end to protect them from British cannon fire being directed against them from the batteries on the Rock.

During the "Grand Assault" of 13 September 1782, when the Spanish and their French allies made a concerted but unsuccessful attempt to attack Gibraltar from land and sea, the batteries of the Lines were used to direct an intensive bombardment against Gibraltar.

== Demolition ==
On 2 May 1808, an uprising broke out in Madrid against the occupation of the city by French troops, provoking a brutal repression by French Imperial forces and triggering the Peninsular War. Rebellions broke out across Spain and in June 1808 the Spanish lines were opened for the first time, allowing the now-allied British free access to the hinterland of Spain. The French responded to the Spanish rebellions by rushing armies to Spain to crush the Spanish uprisings around the country. This raised concerns in Gibraltar, where it was feared that the French could use the Lines to mount a fresh siege against the British territory. As they faced south, the Lines could not be used against an enemy approaching from the north.

In January 1809, the Spanish commander in the region, General Francisco Castaños y Aragón, ordered the garrison of the Lines to strip them of all stores and ammunition, to be shipped to Barcelona and Valencia to support the defence of those cities against the French. Lieutenant-General Colin Campbell, the Lieutenant-Governor of Gibraltar, obtained permission from the Supreme and Central Junta of Spain in Seville to dismantle the Lines. He did not exercise this power at the time, as the French threat to the far south seemed to be receding, but a renewed threat later in the year led to Campbell writing to the British Secretary of War, the Earl of Liverpool, to advise him of the need to proceed with razing the Lines. Liverpool advised caution but in January 1810 a 60,000-strong French force was sent to Andalusia to crush Spanish resistance in the region. The urgency of the situation prompted Campbell to obtain fresh permission from the Supreme Junta via General Castaños. It was granted on 20 January 1810.

Campbell ordered Gibraltar's senior engineer, Colonel Sir Charles Holloway, to carry out preparations for destroying the Lines. It took several days for teams of sappers to install demolition charges in and around the walls, casemates, batteries and towers of the Lines. By the start of February the French Imperial Army's 1st Corps, commanded by Marshal Claude Victor-Perrin, was outside Cádiz only 62 miles (100 km) from Gibraltar. After an advance column of 200–300 Spanish soldiers arrived in Algeciras on the far side of the bay, Campbell gave the order to go ahead with the demolitions.

On the evening of 14 February 1810, thousands of people crowded onto Gibraltar's walls and bastions to watch the demolitions taking place. As a report in The London Chronicle noted, "every part of the garrison facing the Spanish Lines was crowded with Spectators, to witness the explosion which was truly grand and picturesque ... the entire front of [Forts San Felipe and Santa Bárbara] being blown into the ditch, and the whole rendered a complete mass of ruins." The line of fortifications between the two forts was also demolished, along with various other Spanish fortifications around the bay. The debris was hauled away by volunteers from Gibraltar, British soldiers and allied Portuguese sailors from ships in the bay. The demolition achieved its desired objectives; the lines could no longer be used to besiege Gibraltar and they could not be rebuilt by the French without enduring British cannon fire and Spanish guerilla attacks in their rear lines. The French made no attempt to attack Gibraltar and focused their efforts on Cádiz and Tarifa instead. The exiled Napoleon later told Admiral George Cockburn that he had never intended to lay siege to Gibraltar: "Things suited us as they were. Gibraltar is of no value to Britain. It defends nothing. It intercepts nothing. It is simply an object of national pride which costs the English a great deal and wounds deeply the Spanish nation. We should have been crassly stupid to have destroyed such a combination."

Some of the stone from the ruins was later taken to Gibraltar and used to construct a house at Governor's Parade.

== Current state of the Lines ==
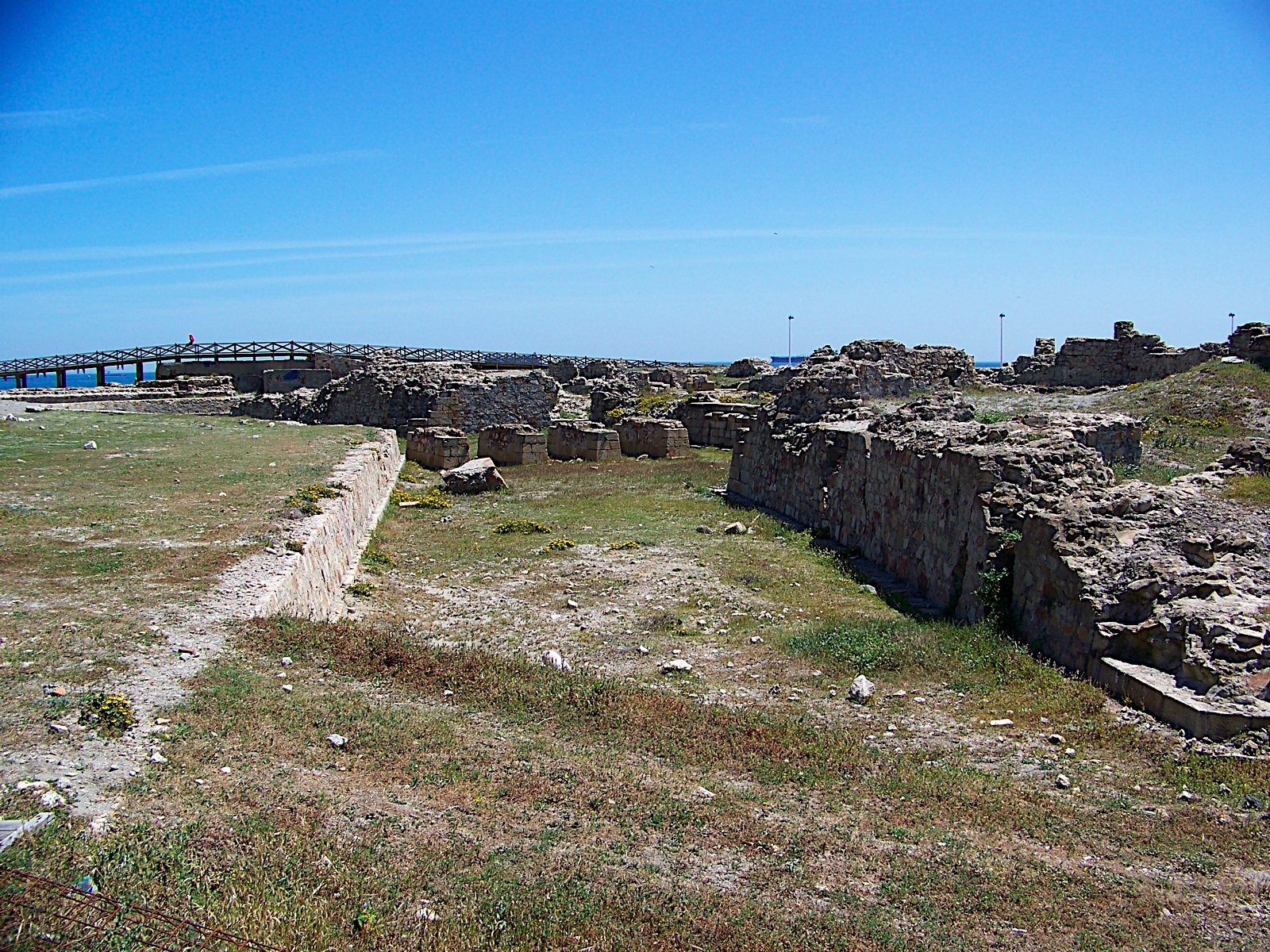
Ruins of the Fort of Santa Bárbara

After the end of the Peninsular War a village grew up around the site of the old lines, within the municipality of the nearby town of San Roque. It grew rapidly, basing its economy on fishing, agriculture and trade with nearby Gibraltar. In July 1870 it was incorporated as a separate municipality named La Línea de la Concepción, after the Virgin of the Immaculate Conception, who was regarded as the patroness of the Spanish Army at the time.

A few remnants of the lines are still visible. The ruins of the Fort of Santa Bárbara have been excavated, and substantial fragments of the fort's foundations can be seen within a small park. Some remains of the Fort of San Felipe have also been uncovered.

== See also ==
- List of missing landmarks in Spain

== Bibliography ==
- Benady, Tito (1996). The Streets of Gibraltar - A Short History. Gibraltar Books.
- Heriot, John (1792). An historical sketch of Gibraltar, with an account of the siege which that fortress stood against the combined forces of France and Spain. London: B. Millan.
- Hills, George (1974). Rock of Contention: A history of Gibraltar. London: Robert Hale & Company. ISBN 0-7091-4352-4.
- Hughes, Quentin; Migos, Athanassios (1995). Strong as the Rock of Gibraltar. Gibraltar: Exchange Publications. OCLC 48491998.
- James, Thomas (1771). The History of the Herculean Straits now called the Straits of Gibraltar including those Ports of Spain and Barbary that lie Contiguous thereto, volume 1. London: C. Rivington. OCLC 834168580.
- Levie, Howard S. (1983). The Status of Gibraltar. Boulder, CO: Westview Press. ISBN 9780865319653.
- López de Ayala, Ignacio (1845). The History of Gibraltar: From the Earliest Period of Its Occupation by the Saracens. London: William Pickering.
- Musteen, Jason R. (2011). Nelson's Refuge: Gibraltar in the Age of Napoleon. New York: Naval Institute Press. ISBN 9781612510842.
