= Alonso Hernández del Portillo =

- Born: 1543; Gibraltar
- Died: 1624 (aged 80–81)
- Citizenship: Spanish
- Occupations: Politician; Historian
- Employer: Gibraltar City Council
- Known for: Literary works on the history of Gibraltar
- Notable work: Historia de la Muy Noble y Más Leal Ciudad de Gibraltar

Alonso Hernández del Portillo (1543–1624) was a Spanish local politician and historian, remembered for being the first chronicler of the city of Gibraltar.

== Biography ==
Hernández del Portillo was born in Gibraltar during the Spanish period. He was a member of the Gibraltar City Council and held responsibilities over the supply of food to the city (Spanish: jurado) during the late 16th and early 17th century. Between 1605 and 1610 he wrote his most notable work, Historia de la Muy Noble y Más Leal Ciudad de Gibraltar (English: History of the Very Noble and Most Loyal City of Gibraltar), the first written history of Gibraltar. The work was later reviewed by himself between 1615 and 1622. The manuscript of the chronicle was kept in the archives of Algeciras and was one of the sources of the work History of Gibraltar by Spanish historian Ignacio López de Ayala in 1792, one of the canonical works of the Spanish historiography about Gibraltar.

== Work ==
Hernández del Portillo chronicles the history of his city from its origins, which he set to be in the times of the Libyan and Ancient Greek Heracles (as a symbol of the Phoenician and Ancient Greek colonisation of the Iberian Peninsula), to his days. It also includes many legendary stories and almost lacks any information about the Moor period. The main value of his work is in his account of the facts he witnessed at first hand, a period not well known in the history of Gibraltar. His accounts made the 16th century people, industry, port, commercial, fishing and agricultural activities of Gibraltar known.

The Historia de la Muy Noble y Más Leal Ciudad de Gibraltar has been published in recent times by the Spanish historian Antonio Torremocha, a specialist in the history of the Campo de Gibraltar. The first edition, titled Historias de Gibraltar (English: Stories of Gibraltar), was published in 1994 (ISBN 978-84-606-1763-1). A second edition, revised and expanded, was published in 2008, under the title History of Gibraltar (English: History of Gibraltar). This second edition is the first issue of the collection Fuentes para la Historia del Campo de Gibraltar (English: Sources of the History of the Campo de Gibraltar). Torremocha defines Portillo as a Renaissance Man.
