= List of mammals of Gibraltar =

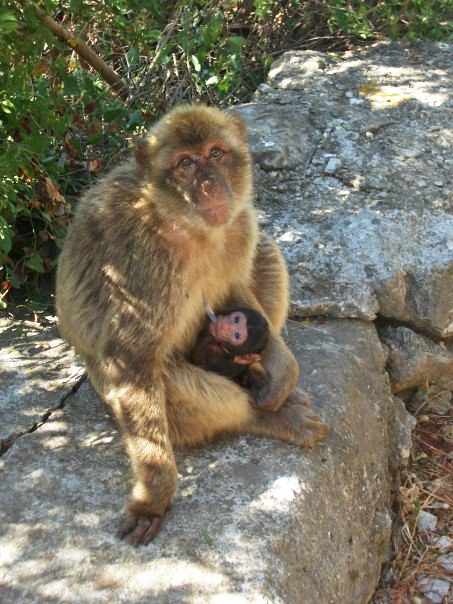
Female Barbary macaque feeding its young at the Mediterranean Steps, Gibraltar

This is a list of the mammal species recorded in Gibraltar by the Gibraltar Ornithological and Natural History Society. There are twenty-four wild mammal species in Gibraltar, of which one is critically endangered, one is endangered, three are vulnerable, and one is near threatened.

Icons which state each species' global IUCN status:
CR	Critically endangered	In imminent risk of extinction in the wild
EN	Endangered	Facing an extremely high risk of extinction in the wild
VU	Vulnerable	Facing a high risk of extinction in the wild
NT	Near threatened	Doesn't meet any of the criteria that would categorise it as risking extinction but likely to in the future
LC	Least concern	No current identifiable risks to this species
DD	Data deficient	There is inadequate information to make an assessment of the risks to this species

== Order: Chiroptera (bats) ==
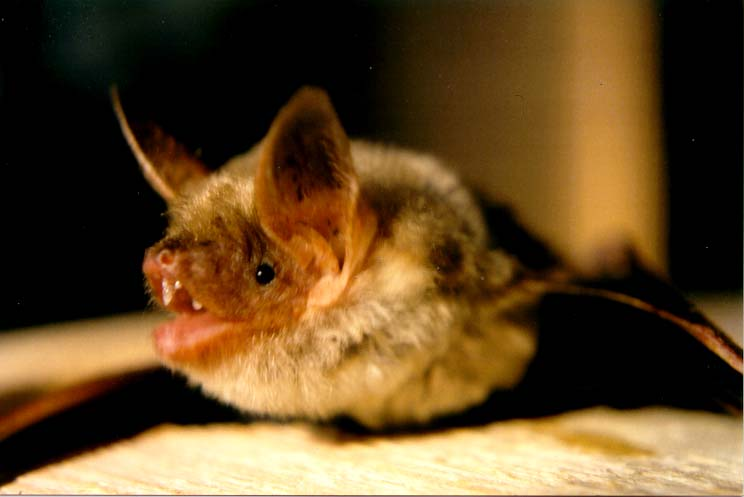
A greater mouse-eared bat

- Suborder: Microchiroptera
  - Family: Vespertilionidae
    - Genus: Myotis
      - Greater mouse-eared bat, Myotis myotis LC extirpated
    - Genus: Pipistrellus
      - Soprano pipistrelle, Pipistrellus pygmaeus DD
    - Genus: Miniopterus
      - Schreibers' long-fingered bat, Miniopterus schreibersii DD
  - Family: Molossidae
    - Genus: Tadarida
      - European free-tailed bat, Tadarida teniotis DD
  - Family: Rhinolophidae
    - Subfamily: Rhinolophinae
      - Genus: Rhinolophus
        - Greater horseshoe bat, R. ferrumequinum LC extirpated
        - Lesser horseshoe bat, R. hipposideros LC extirpated

== Order: Primates (monkeys, lemur-relatives, lemurs and apes) ==
- Family: Cercopithecidae
  - Genus: Macaca
    - Barbary macaque, M. sylvanus EN introduced

== Order: Carnivora (carnivores) ==
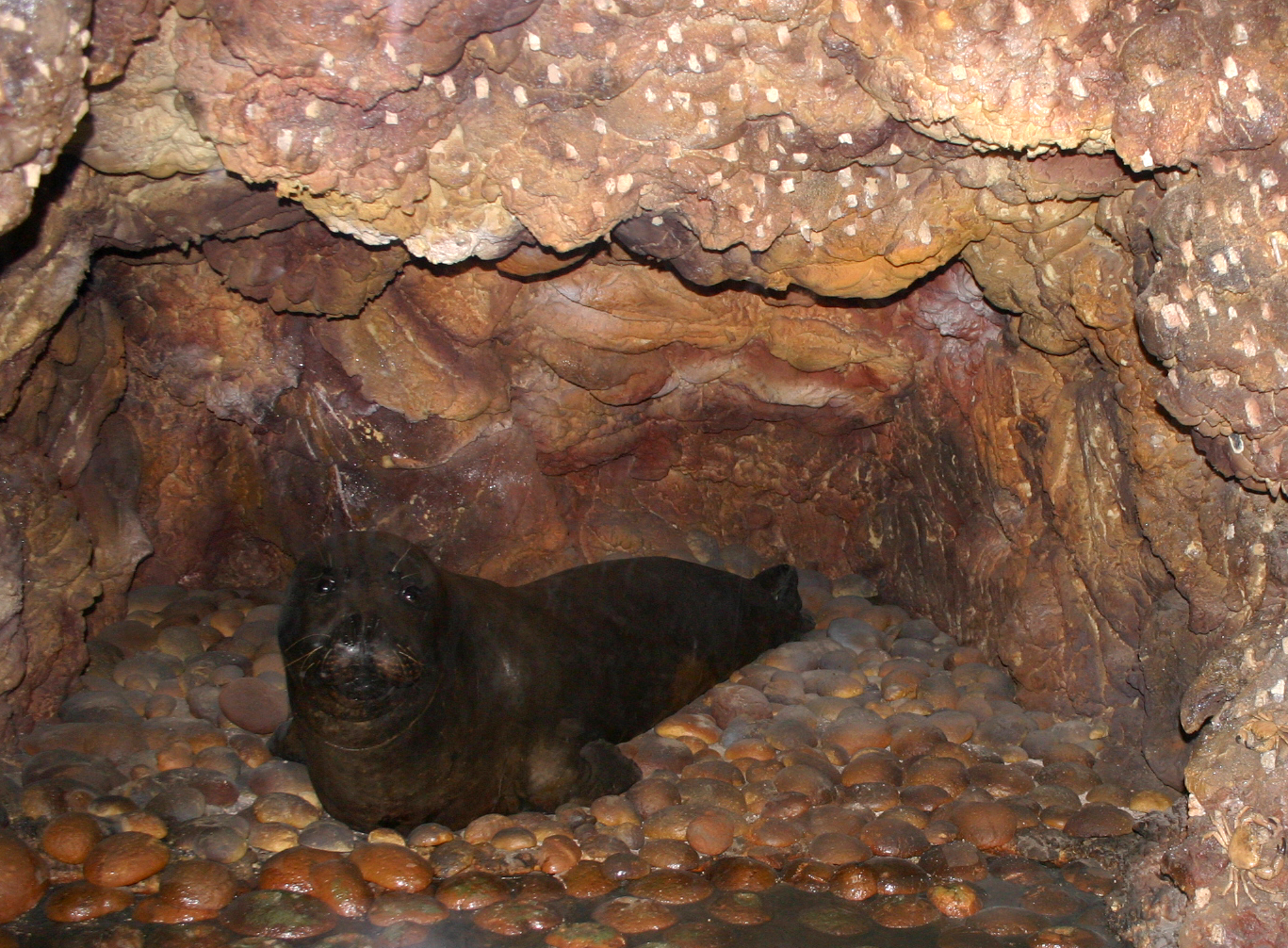
A Mediterranean monk seal

- Family: Canidae (dogs and foxes)
  - Genus: Vulpes
    - Red fox, Vulpes vulpes LC extirpated

== Infraorder (Order: Artiodactyla): Cetacea (dolphins and whales) ==
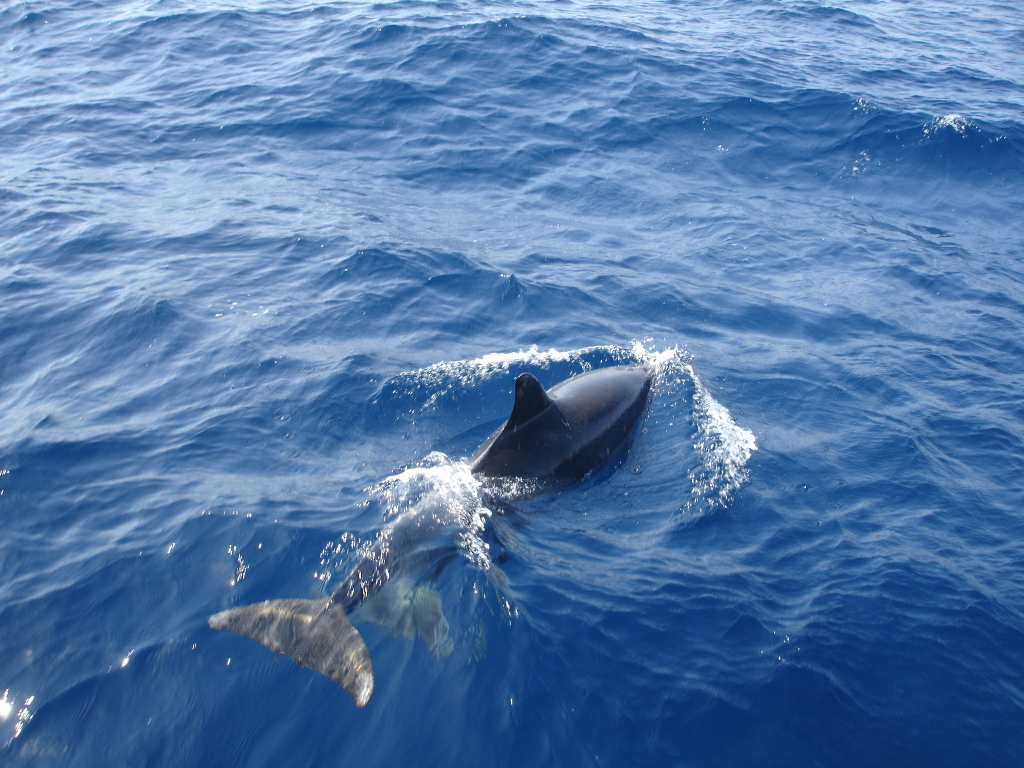
Dolphins in the strait

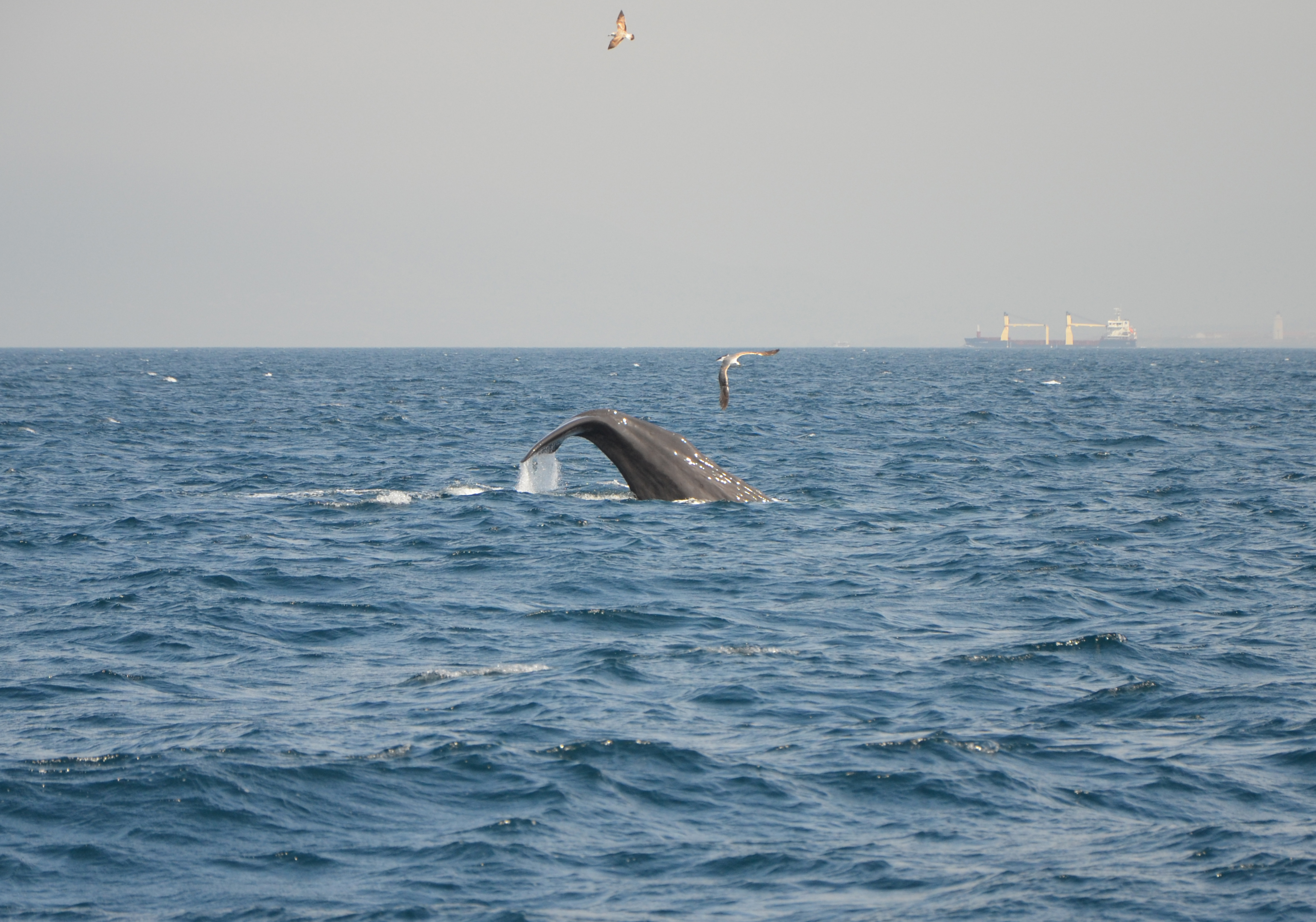
A sperm whale diving in the strait.

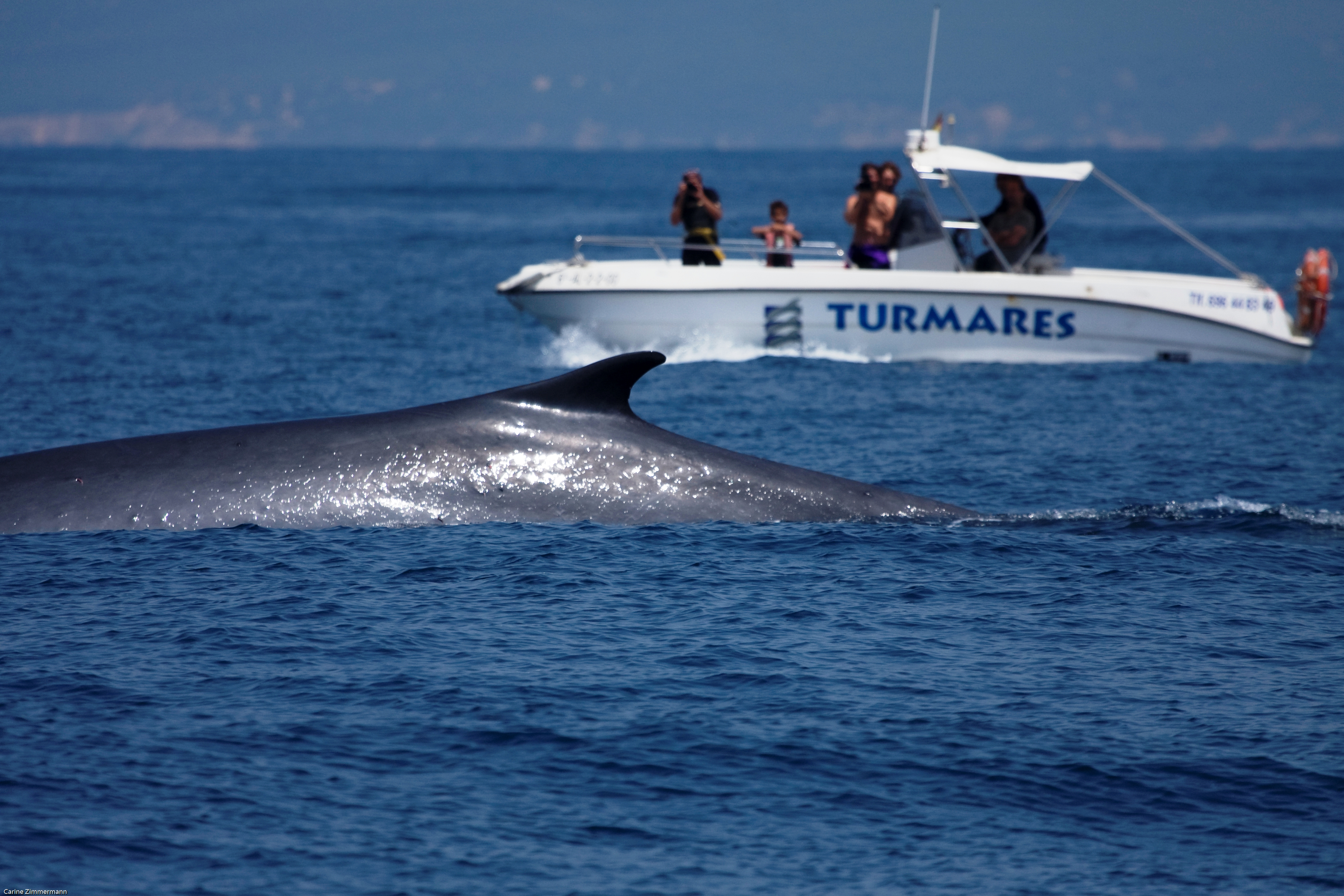
Whale watching vessel and fin whale off Tarifa

- Suborder: Mysticeti
  - Family: Balaenopteridae (rorquals)
    - Genus: Balaenoptera
      - Fin whale, Balaenoptera physalus VU
      - Common minke whale, Balaenoptera acutorostrata LC
- Suborder: Odontoceti
  - Family: Physeteridae (sperm whales)
    - Genus: Physeter
      - Sperm whale, Physeter macrocephalus EN
  - Family: Ziphiidae (beaked whales)
    - Genus: Ziphius
      - Cuvier's beaked whale, Ziphius cavirostris VU
    - Family: Delphinidae (marine dolphins)
      - Genus: Tursiops
        - Common bottlenose dolphin, Tursiops truncatus VU
      - Genus: Steno
        - Rough-toothed dolphin, Steno bredanensis DD
    - Genus: Stenella
      - Striped dolphin, Stenella coeruleoalba VU
      - Genus: Delphinus
        - Short-beaked common dolphin, Delphinus delphis EN
      - Genus: Grampus
        - Risso's dolphin, Grampus griseus DD
    - Genus: Globicephala
      - Long-finned pilot whale, Globicephala melas DD
      - Genus: Orcinus
        - Orca, Orcinus orca DD

== Order: Rodentia (rodents) ==
- Family: Muridae (rats and mice)
  - Genus: Rattus
    - Black rat, Rattus rattus LC introduced
    - Brown rat, Rattus norvegicus LC introduced
  - Genus: Mus
    - House mouse, Mus musculus LC

== Order: Lagomorpha (rabbits and hares) ==
European rabbit in Spain

- Family: Leporidae
  - Genus: Oryctolagus
    - European rabbit, Oryctolagus cuniculus EN

== Order: Artiodactyla (even-toed ungulates) ==
The even-toed ungulates are ungulates whose weight is borne about equally by the third and fourth toes, rather than mostly or entirely by the third as in perissodactyls. There are about 220 artiodactyl species, including many that are of great economic importance to humans.

- Family: Bovidae (bovids)
  - Subfamily: Caprinae
    - Iberian ibex, C. pyrenaica LC extirpated
      - Southeastern Spanish ibex, C. p. pyrenaica extirpated

== See also ==
- Barbary macaques in Gibraltar
- List of birds of Gibraltar
- List of chordate orders
- Lists of mammals by region
- Mammal classification
- List of mammals described in the 2000s
