= Ruins of Fort St. Barbara =

Ruins of the Fort of St. Barbara
- Ruínas del Fuerte de Santa Bárbara (Spanish)
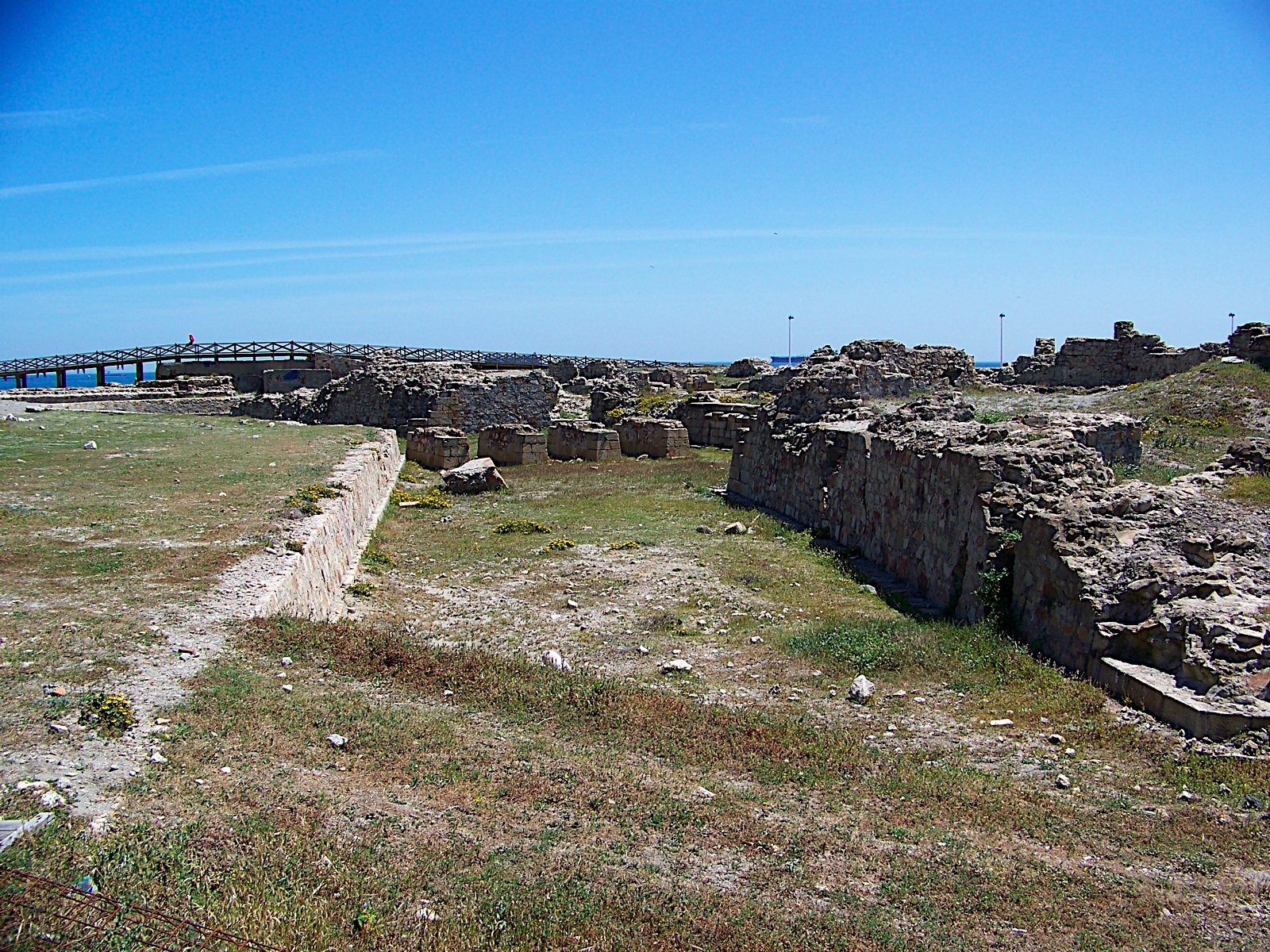

- Location within Province of Cádiz Location within Spain
- 36.160218°N 5.338815°W
- Location: La Línea de la Concepción, Spain

Spanish Cultural Heritage
- Official name: Ruínas del Fuerte de Santa Bárbara
- Type: Non-movable
- Criteria: Monument
- Designated: 1994
- Reference no.: RI-51-0008999

The Ruins of Fort St. Barbara (Spanish: Ruínas del Fuerte de Santa Bárbara) are the ruins of a fort located in La Línea de la Concepción, Spain. It was declared Bien de Interés Cultural in 1994.

== History ==
This fort was just one part of a whole line of defence known as the Lines of Contravallation of Gibraltar. This fortification was constructed by the Spanish after Gibraltar was formally ceded to the United Kingdom after being captured by an Anglo-Dutch force in 1704. The agreement to cede the isthmus was part of the Treaty of Utrecht and Spain gave Britain Menorca, Gibraltar and the right to sell slaves to Spanish colonies. As a result, a defensive line (hence La Línea) was built at the north end of the isthmus joining the Rock of Gibraltar to Spain in order to keep the British from attacking or encroaching on Spain.

In a later bilateral agreement between Spain and the UK when they agreed mutual support against Napoleon, it was agreed that this defensive line would be destroyed. It was argued that this was necessary to prevent these fortifications from falling under French control. The main Spanish lines were destroyed by Colonel Sir Charles Holloway on 14 February 1810. Following the main explosion other towers were destroyed and volunteers took away the rubble.

The ruins today are owned by the Spanish municipality of La Línea de la Concepción. The ruins were declared a national cultural interest of Spain (Bien de Interés Cultural) in 1994.
