= Luis Bravo de Acuña =

Spanish soldier

- Died: 1634; Madrid
- Occupation: Soldier
- Known for: Spanish Minister of War

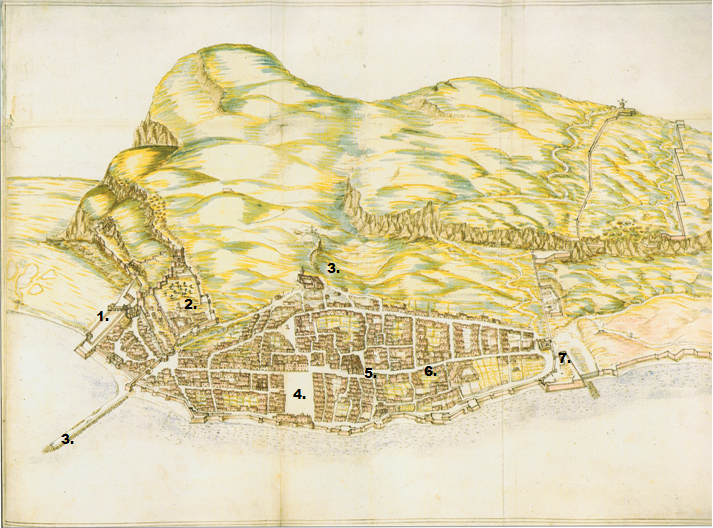
Map of the town of Gibraltar showing its fortifications in 1627, from the report by Luis Bravo de Acuña

Luis Bravo de Acuña (died 1634) was a Spanish soldier known for his work on the fortifications of Gibraltar who also served as Spanish Minister of War, Ambassador to Venice and Viceroy of Navarre.

== Biography ==
Luis Bravo de Acuña, Villarroel y Castro was a native of Cisneros. His family belonged to the lesser nobility. He was made a knight of the Order of Calatrava in 1599.

In 1609 he commanded four galleys that accompanied a ship carrying Muley Xeque, exiled king of Fez, Morocco and Sous. On 7 December 1611 Bravo de Acuña was in Lisbon as general overseer of the military forces of the kingdom of Portugal, at that time a possession of the king of Spain, and also in charge of the Spanish galleys in that kingdom. A document of 3 May 1614 records that after the death of Juan Maldonado Barnuevo, Luis Bravo de Acuña was given the title of general overseer of all the galleys of Spain and Italy. A document of 1618 records payment of salary and expenses for this position. He was Ambassador to Venice from 1618 to 1620.

In 1625 the English made an unsuccessful attack on Cadiz, raising concerns about the defenses. In 1627 Luis Bravo de Acuña prepared an audit of all the buildings and defenses of Gibraltar for the Spanish Crown, which includes the oldest surviving accurate map of Gibraltar. Bravo de Acuña played a key role in defining improvements to the defenses of Gibraltar that would be undertaken by Gaspar de Guzmán, Count-Duke of Olivares during the reign of Philip IV of Spain. He concentrated on rebuilding the northern defenses, which were most vulnerable to a land attack. He also prepared works on the defenses of Cádiz, Tarifa and other places. However, his recommendations for Tarifa were largely ignored.

Bravo de Acuña was an admirer of El Greco. At the time of the painter's death in 1619, Bravo de Acuña owned two pictures by the artist of St. Jerome, one of the Magdalen and one of St. Francis. He was viceroy of Navarre from 1631 to 1634, succeeding Juan Clarós de Guzman y Silva, Marqués de Fuentes in this position. He died in Madrid in 1634.
