= Ignacio López de Ayala =

Spanish writer and historian

Ignacio López de Ayala (18 October 1739 Grazalema, Cádiz – 24 April 1789 in Tarifa) was a Spanish writer, astronomer and historian.

== Life ==
He was a professor of poetry at the Reales Estudios de San Isidro in Madrid. He authored a neoclassical tragedy, Numancia destruida (1775). His works were mainly heroic romances. He was also a respected historian, authoring history books on Frederick the Great (Historia de Federico el Grande, rey de Prusia) (1782), the History of Gibraltar (Historia de Gibraltar) (1782) and the Council of Trent (El sacrosanto y ecuménico concilio de Trento) (1787). These works gained him membership of the Real Academia de la Historia. In his later years he also wrote on astronomy, Disertaciones astronómicas and Filosofía moral de Aristóteles, astronomical dissertations and the moral philosophy of Aristotle. He was a member of the Real Academia de Bellas Artes de San Fernando. He died on 24 April 1789 in Tarifa.
