= Martín Álvarez de Sotomayor =

Spanish Army officer

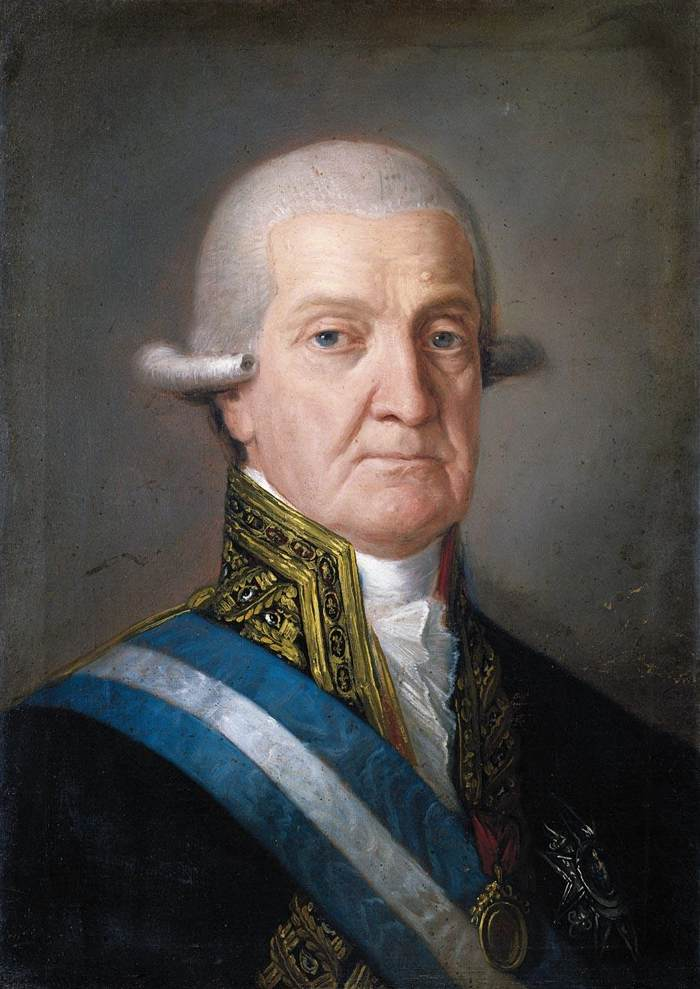
Portrait of Sotomayor by Agustín Esteve

Martín Antonio Álvarez de Sotomayor y Soto-Flores, 1st Count of Colomera (28 October 1723 – 9 September 1819) was a Spanish Army officer. He fought in Italy during the War of the Polish Succession (1733–1735) and was marechal de camp during the 1762 war with Portugal. From 1788 to 1790 he was viceroy of Navarre and during the Anglo-Spanish War he led the Great Siege of Gibraltar until 1782, when he was relegated to command only its Spanish contingent. He was a minister and recipient of the Order of Charles III, but died without issue.
