= Charles Holloway (British Army officer) =

Major-General Sir Charles Holloway
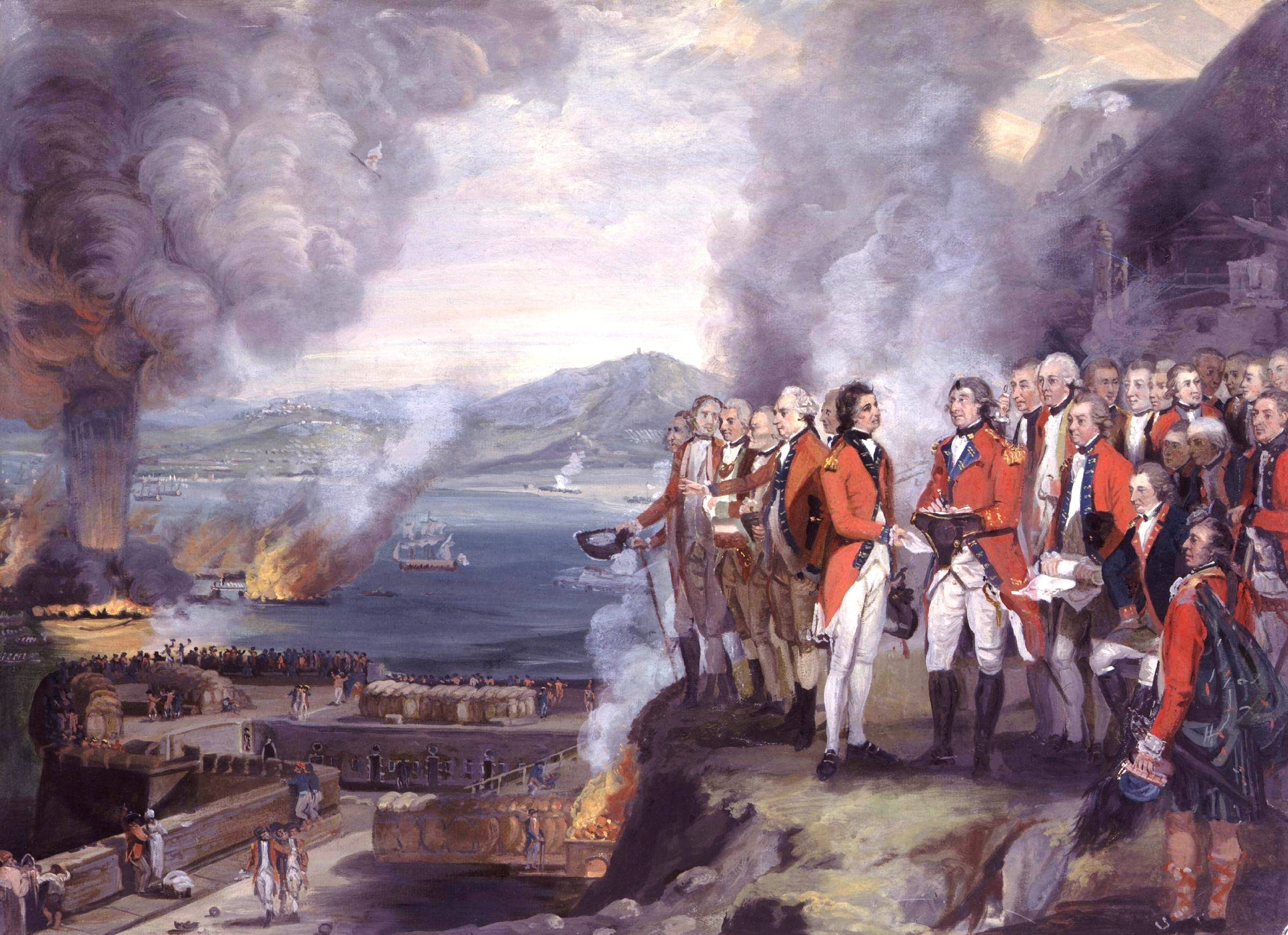
- Holloway is amongst the principal officers recorded in the commemorative painting of the Siege of Gibraltar by George Carter.
- Born: 17 April 1749
- Died: 4 January 1827 (aged 77) Devonport

Major-General Sir Charles Holloway (17 April 1749 – 4 January 1827) was an officer in the Royal Engineers. He served at the Great Siege of Gibraltar and returned later as Commanding Royal Engineer when he destroyed the Spanish fortifications (Lines of Contravallation) between Spain and Gibraltar.

== Life ==
Holloway was born to unrecorded parents on 17 April 1749. At the age of fifteen he entered the drawing room of the board of ordnance at the Tower of London - a building that he would later improve. In 1772 he was sent to help the commanding royal engineer with his plans for new fortifications at Portsmouth and where he became a second lieutenant in the royal engineers.

== Great Siege of Gibraltar ==
In 1777 Holloway went to Gibraltar and in 1779, in the first year of the Great Siege of Gibraltar, he was staff officer to the chief engineer, Colonel William Green. He was also adjutant of the engineers and of the Soldier Artificer Company. (Holloway was to marry Green's daughter Helen Mary in 1785) On 17 April 1781 he was made brigade major, and when Green became a major-general he was appointed his aide-de-camp in 1782. Another aide-de-camp was George Koehler who invented a new tilting gun and would serve with Holloway later. In 1783 he became lieutenant but he was also severely wounded by shrapnel from a mortar boat. During the siege he kept a diary. On 7 June 1783 the governor, Sir George Augustus Eliott, afterwards Lord Heathfield, thanked him publicly for his services during the siege. Eliott, Holloway, Koehler, George Mackenzie, Thomas Trigge and William Green are amongst those recorded as the principal officers serving in the siege who were painted by George Carter for the City of London. The National Portrait Gallery have an oil sketch but the final painting is at the National Army Museum.

== Surveying England ==
In 1784 he surveyed England under the command of Major-general William Roy. They mapped from the Hounslow base to the Kentish coast. Before he left he also assisted in connect the English with the French system of triangulation in 1787. In that year his first son was born. He was to take the name William Cuthbert Elphinestone-Holloway and was also a notable engineer. For the next ten years Holloway in England and this included strengthening the Tower of London in 1792.

== Ottomans ==
In 1798 Holloway's wife died and he was appointed that October to be commanding royal engineer and second in command of a military mission en route to the Ottoman Empire. He was chosen by his former colleague Brigadier-general George Koehler. Koehler had been tasked with to assist the Turks in the reorganisation of their army. They left London with the mission but by Christmas Eve they shipwrecked among the ice at the mouth of the River Elbe. The mission was rescued and traveled across the continent to Constantinople. The following June, Major Robert Hope of the royal artillery and Holloway reported upon the fortifications of the Dardanelles and successfully advised on their improvement including at Tenedos and the gulf of Saros.

In 1800 the 100 strong British mission joined the Ottoman army in Syria. It was encamped at Jaffa after retiring from Egypt, and, at the grand vizier's request, Holloway entrenched the camp and designed additional defences for Jaffa. A virulent attack of plague towards the end of the year caused great mortality, and carried off Koehler and his wife that December. The command of the mission then devolved upon Holloway, who received the local rank of lieutenant-colonel from 1 January 1801. It was Holloway's orders to bring the Turks back to Egypt to assist a newly arrived army under the command of General Sir Ralph Abercromby. Early in the following month, the plague having ceased, the Turkish army advanced and, after crossing the desert, came in contact with a superior French force under General Belliard in May. Holloway was in de facto command of the Turkish Army, both in the advance from Jaffa and during their countering of the French attack at the seven-hour Battle of al-Khanka on 16 May. In July Holloway' mission entered nearby Cairo and remained there until 18 February 1802. The mission returned home under the command of Major (afterwards Sir) Richard Fletcher, royal engineers. Holloway returned to England in July via, Constantinople and Vienna. For his services with the Turkish army, Holloway, who had been invested by the sultan with five different pelisses and a gold medal in November 1801. Holloway was knighted on 2 February 1803 on the recommendation of Lord Elgin.

== Cork ==
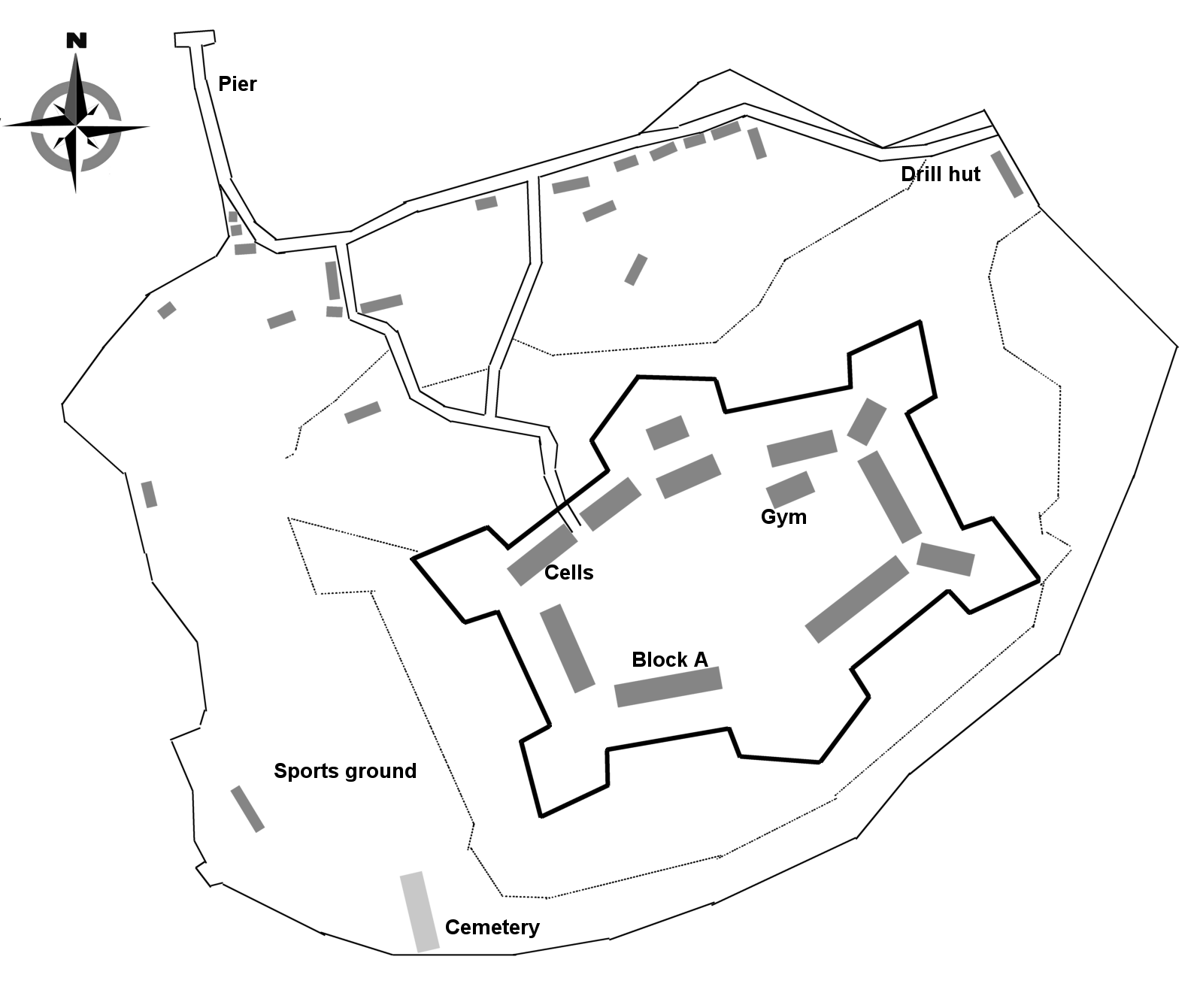
Plan of Spike Island in Cork Harbour showing the fort that Holloway proposed

In March 1803 Sir Charles Holloway took up the post of commanding royal engineer of the Cork district, and was active in carrying out works of defence in Cork harbour. It has his proposal that led to the fort on Spike Island in the middle of Cork Harbour. He became a lieutenant-colonel in 1804 and the following year he was appointed not only as a member of a committee looking at the defence for Ireland but also of the engineer committee for the Tower of London.

== Destroying forts ==
He was nominated commanding royal engineer at Gibraltar in 1807, where he arrived on 13 September. In 1809 Holloway reported on the defences of the Strait of Gibraltar including Cádiz, Ceuta and Algeciras. On 14 February 1810, and in the following year, with the consent of the Spanish authorities, he demolished by mines the Spanish forts and lines in front of the fortress on the north of the neutral ground of the Gibraltar isthmus to prevent their use by Napoleon's armies. The substantial fortifications included Fort Filipe and Fort Barbara which had been designed to prevent the British from invading Spain. Holloway became a Colonel in May 1811.

In 1813 and 1814 there was a fever in Gibraltar which killed three of his servants, Major General Holloway's son lieutenant Charles Holloway and his daughter, Helen Smith, an officer's wife. His family had a seven volume diary of his stay in Gibraltar. He returned to England in September 1817, and died at Stoke Damerel, Devon on 4 January 1827. At his request he was buried with one of his six children at Exeter Cathedral.
