= George Mackenzie (British Army officer) =

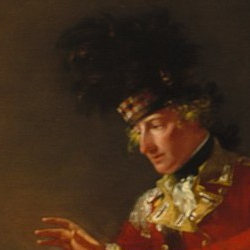
- Mackenzie in The Sortie Made by the Garrison of Gibraltar by John Trumbull in 1789
- Born: 1741; Tarbat House
- Died: 4 June 1787 (aged 45–46); Walajabad
- Known for: Great Siege of Gibraltar

George Mackenzie (1741 – 4 June 1787) was a British Army officer who commanded the 2nd battalion of the 73rd Highlanders during the Great Siege of Gibraltar.

== Life ==
Mackenzie was born in Tarbat House in Ross-shire in Scotland. He was one of the twelve children of George Mackenzie, 3rd Earl of Cromartie. His father was found guilty of treason and sentenced to death for raising a Jacobite regiment, but then pardoned.

He managed to avoid any problems because he was only five at the time of his father's trial. He joined the army and work his way up the ranks of the Royal Regiment and Royal Highland Regt. until he was placed in commanded of the 2nd battalion of the 73rd Highlanders in 1778. He was in charge at the Great Siege of Gibraltar and he was included in several commemorative painting including The Sortie Made by the Garrison of Gibraltar, 1789 by John Trumbull. Masckenzie, Charles Holloway, Thomas Trigge, General William Green and George Koehler are amongst those recorded as the principal officers serving in the siege when it was painted by George Carter for the City of London. The National Portrait Gallery have an oil sketch but the final painting is at the National Army Museum.

Despite their role in this important victory the 2nd Battalion was disbanded in 1783 and Mackenzie was asked to lead the 1st Battalion in India. This battalion became the 71st Highlanders when they were renumbered following the disbanding of Fraser's regiment.

Mackenzie died in Walajabad from a fever on 4 June 1787 and was buried there the same day without a wife or children.
