= George Koehler =

British army officer, artist and engineer

George Frederick Koehler
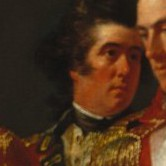
- George Koehler from The Sortie Made by the Garrison of Gibraltar, 1789 by John Trumbull
- Born: 14 January 1758; Woolwich, England
- Died: 29 December 1800 (aged 42); Jaffa, Ottoman Empire

George Frederick Koehler (14 January 1758 – 29 December 1800) was a British army officer, artist and engineer. He is known for creating a gun that recoiled allowing it to fire down the side of a mountain without sending the gun carriage flying into the air. The Koehler Depressing Carriage is still commemorated today in Gibraltar where it was an important defence during the Great Siege of Gibraltar.

== Life ==
Koehler was born in 1758 and baptised in Woolwich. His father was a bombardier born in Rennermuehle, Bavaria, who emigrated to Britain via Hesse and Hannover. He became a second lieutenant in the Royal Artillery in January 1780.

Koehler is remembered for his invention of a gun-carriage allowing the axis of the gun to be depressed to an angle of seventy degrees. This was demonstrated during the Great Siege of Gibraltar on 15 February 1782 at Princess Royal's Battery. This new carriage enabled the defending guns to take advantage of the height of the Rock of Gibraltar. Although not a new idea it was ingenious and the invention of the sliding carriage allowed the gun to recoil without pulling the gun carriage into the air. This idea was later built into more conventional gun carriages. Colonel John Drinkwater in his accounts claimed that the gun hit its target 28 times out of 30 when aimed at the Spaniards' San Carlos Battery. He was a first lieutenant when he made the invention but he became a brevet-major the following year. He joined the Governor of Gibraltar's staff and despite the poor first impressions he first made he was to become a confidential aide de campe with Charles Holloway. By 1800 he was a brevet Colonel.

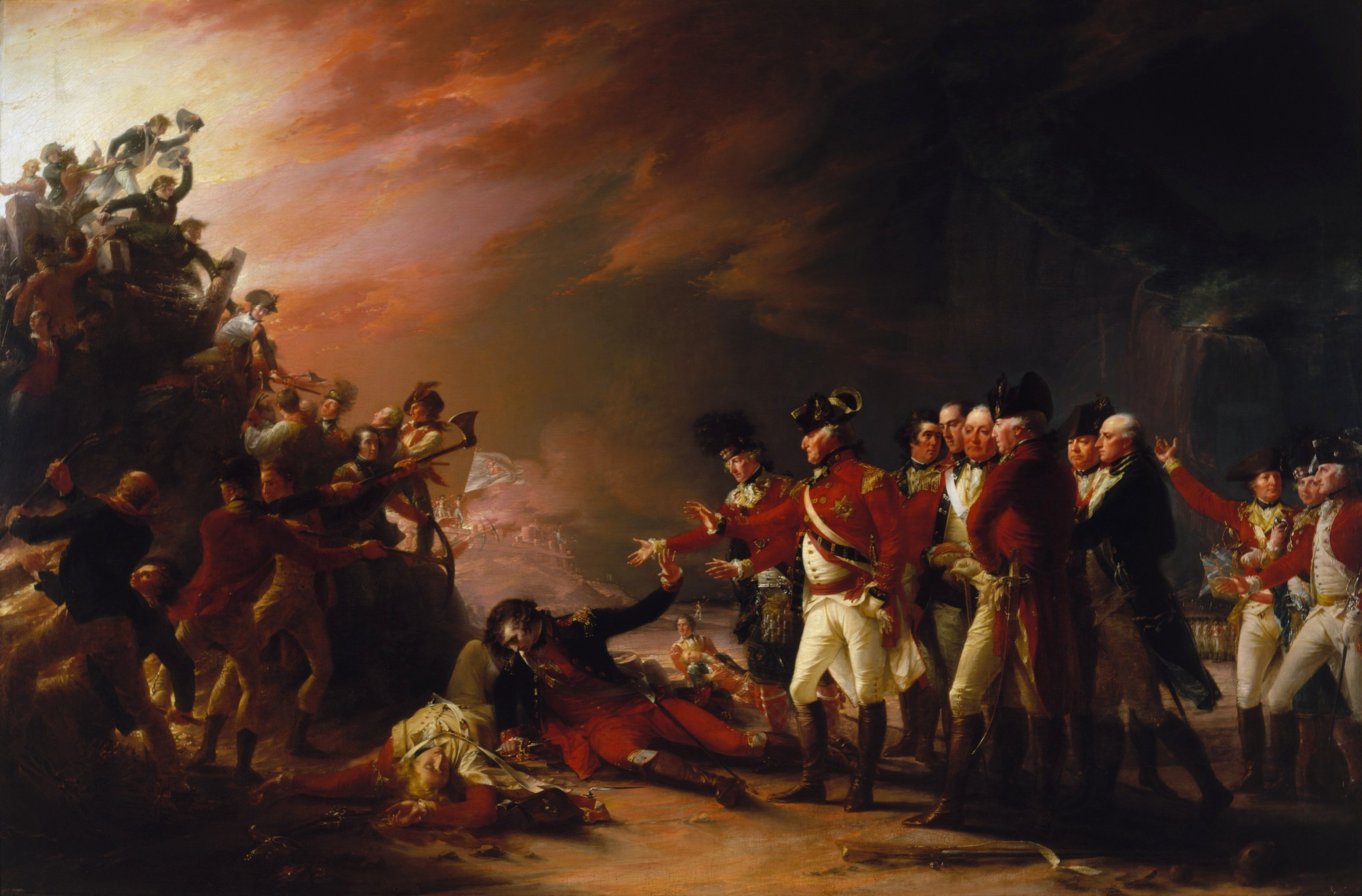
The Sortie from Gibraltar by John Trumbull (1789).

Koehler was awarded the Governor's sword for his action during a famous sortie against the Spanish.

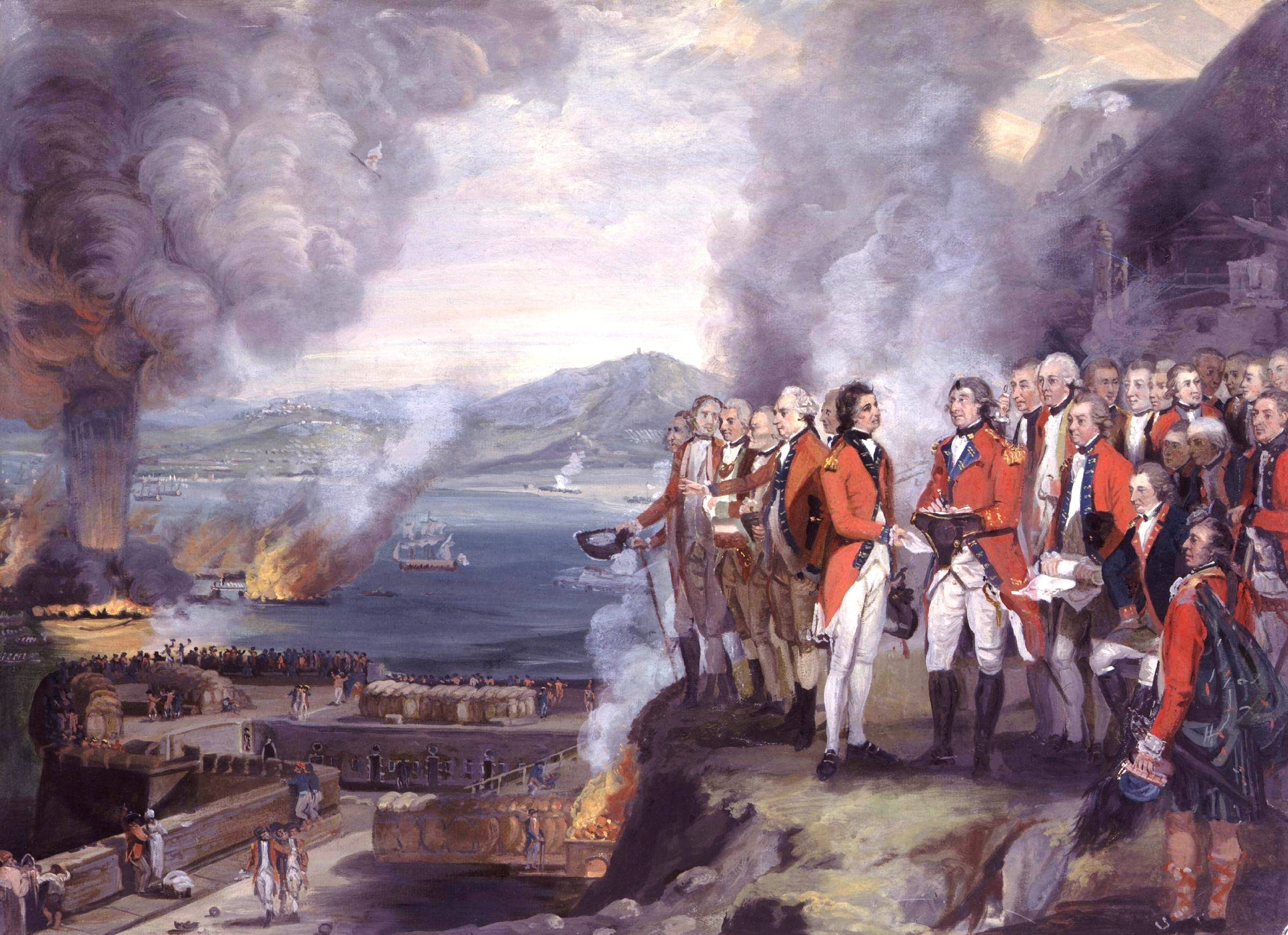
Koehler is amongst the principal officers recorded in the commemorative painting of the Siege of Gibraltar by George Carter.

Koehler, Sir George Augustus Eliott, Charles Holloway, George Mackenzie, Thomas Trigge and General William Green are amongst those recorded as the principal officers serving in the siege who were painted by George Carter for the City of London. The National Portrait Gallery have an oil sketch but the final painting is at the National Army Museum.

He commanded the army of the United Belgian States in 1790 which fought against the troops of the Austrian Emperor Leopold II during the Brabant Revolution.

In 1794, Gilbert Elliot, Earl of Minto who was to be a viceroy to the short lived Anglo-Corsican Kingdom, Lieutenant-colonel John Moore and Koehler went to Corsica for talks with the renegade General Pasquale Paoli.

In December 1800 he led a mission to help the Ottomans eject the French. The British Government had authorised stores, artillery and 100 personnel. He arrived in July and visited Jerusalem in October and arrived in Jaffa assisting in its defence. This is where he and his wife died as a result of fever. He was replaced by Major General Charles Holloway who had served with him in Gibraltar.

== Legacy ==
Koehler died without a will and his fortune went to the British Government. A claim was made by a family in Germany in 1820. The legal battle went on until 1859 when it was ruled that three people should get a share of over £7,600 from his estate and over fourteen thousand pounds worth of interest.

In 1995 Gibraltar issued a new design for their ten-pound note and this includes a small picture of Koehler's gun.

In 2012 the Gibraltar Government issued designs for new coinage which included a representation of Koehler's novel gun design on the ten pence coin.
