= Thomas Trigge =

British Army officer

General Sir Thomas Trigge KB
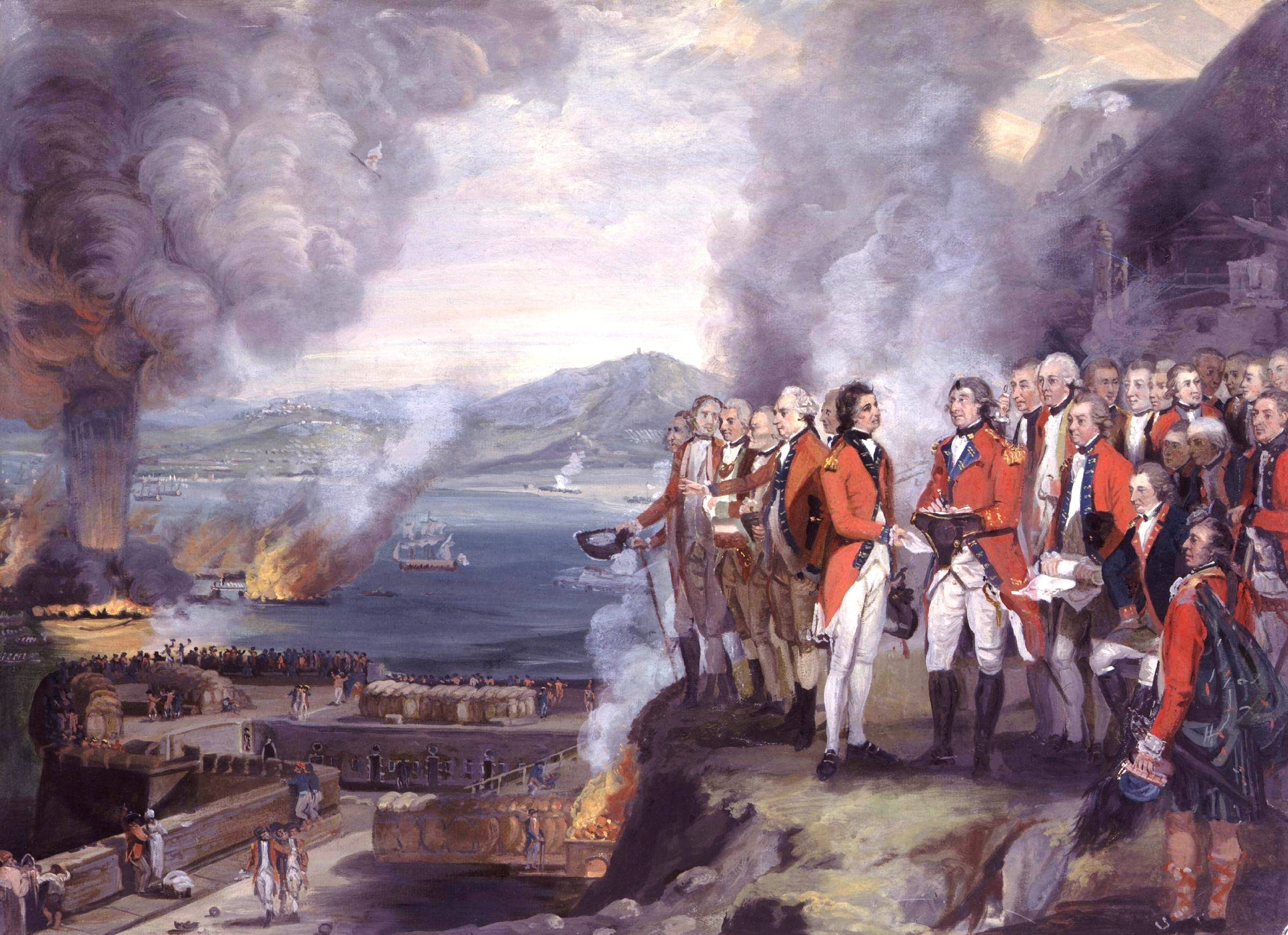
- Illustration of the Great Siege of Gibraltar. Trigge is in the centre foreground.
- Born: c. 1742; Great Britain
- Died: 11 January 1814 (aged 71–72); Savile Row, London
- Burial place: Westminster Abbey
- Military career
- Allegiance: Great Britain
- Branch: British Army
- Service years: 1759–1809
- Rank: General
- Units: 68th Foot, 1795–1809; 44th Foot, 1809–1814
- Commands: Lieutenant Governor of Gibraltar, May 1803 to December 1804
- Conflicts: Seven Years' War; Battle of Minden; Battle of Villinghausen; Battle of Wilhelmsthal; American War of Independence; Great Siege of Gibraltar; French Revolutionary Wars; Surrender of Saint Barthélemy (1801)
- Awards: Knight of the Bath

General Sir Thomas Trigge KB (c. 1742 – 11 January 1814) was a British Army officer who began his career in 1759 during the Seven Years' War, as an ensign in the 12th Regiment of Foot. He remained with the regiment for the next 36 years, and commanded it during the Great Siege of Gibraltar. In 1795, he was military commander in the West Indies during the French Revolutionary Wars, participating in the capture of Suriname and several Dutch-held Leeward Islands. He later returned to Gibraltar, serving briefly as lieutenant governor. He retired from active service in 1809 and died in London on 11 January 1814, being buried in Westminster Abbey with a monument by John Bacon.

== Life ==
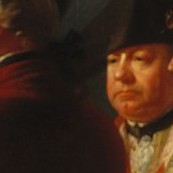
Trigge in the commemorative painting of The Sortie Made by the Garrison of Gibraltar, 1789

Thomas Trigge was born around 1742 and joined the army as an Ensign in the 12th Regiment of Foot during the Seven Years' War. He served in Germany, including the battles of Minden, Villinghausen and Wilhelmsthal. Trigge commanded the 12th Regiment during the Great Siege of Gibraltar and was included in a commemorative painting. Charles Holloway, George Koehler and Mackenzie are among those recorded as the principal officers serving in the siege which was painted by George Carter for the City of London. The National Portrait Gallery have a gouache sketch but the final painting is at the National Army Museum. He became Lieutenant-Governor of Portsmouth in September 1790 which came with the additional post of General Officer Commanding South-West District from 1793.

While Commander-in-Chief in the West Indies, a joint Army and Navy expedition under Lieutenant-General Trigge and Vice-Admiral Seymour captured Suriname from the Dutch on 20 August 1799. They also captured a French corsair of 20 guns, the Hussard, commanded by Marie-Étienne Peltier. He was at the origin of the Quasi-War decided by Burnel, the governor of French Guiana. In March 1801, Trigge and Rear-Admiral Duckworth captured St. Martin (a Franco-Dutch possession), St. Bartholomew (Swedish), and St. Thomas, St. John, and St. Croix (Danish). For his successes, he was made a Knight of the Bath.

In May 1802 Prince Edward, Duke of Kent and Strathearn, arrived in Gibraltar as Governor with expectations that he would instil order in the garrison, where the troops were frequently drunken and ill disciplined. The Prince was enthusiastic and keen but his approach did not impress the troops and mutiny ensued. The Prince was able to keep order but he ignored the orders from his brother to return home until he felt that he had issued sufficient new rules. Eventually the Prince left Gibraltar, never to return and although he nominally remained the Governor it was Major General Trigge who was briefly the first in a long line of acting Lieutenant Governors. One of Trigge's first acts as acting Governor was to countermand 35 of the 169 new regulations his predecessor had introduced.

== Bibliography ==
Tugdual de Langlais, Marie-Étienne Peltier Capitaine corsaire de la République : 1762-1810, Coiffard Éditions, Nantes, 2017, 240 p.

Government offices
Preceded by Duke of Kent	Governor of Gibraltar (acting); 1803–1804	Succeeded by Henry Edward Fox (acting)
Military offices
Preceded by New Post	GOC South-West District; 1793–1796	Succeeded by Cornelius Cuyler
Preceded by Hon. Charles Stuart	Colonel, 68th Foot; 1795–1809	Succeeded by John Coape Sherbrooke
Preceded by Charles Leigh	Commander-in-Chief, Windward and Leeward Islands; 1799–1802	Succeeded by William Grinfield
Preceded by Charles Rainsford	Colonel, 44th Foot; 1809–1814	Succeeded by Earl of Suffolk
