= Koehler Depressing Carriage =

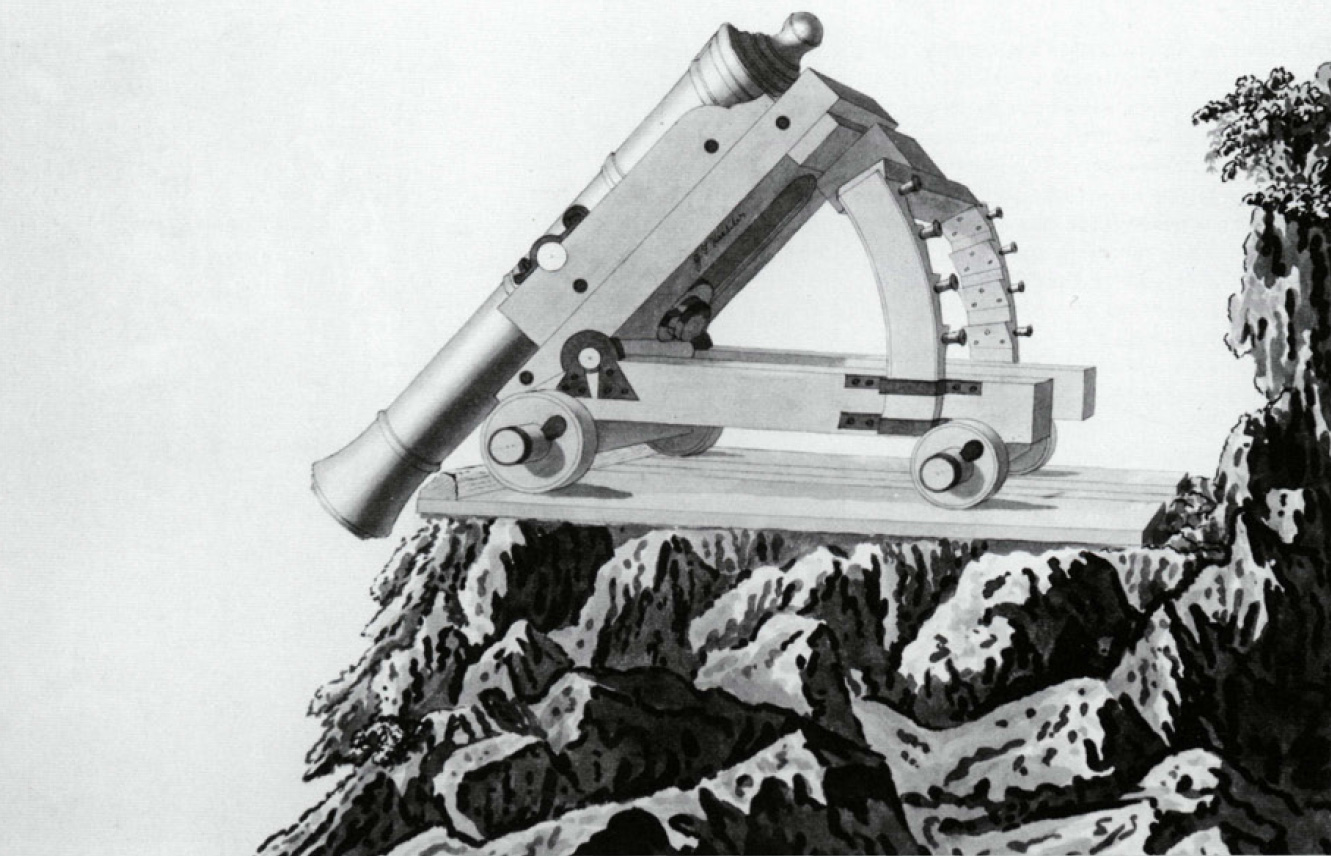
Koehler's Depressing Carriage, as depicted by its inventor

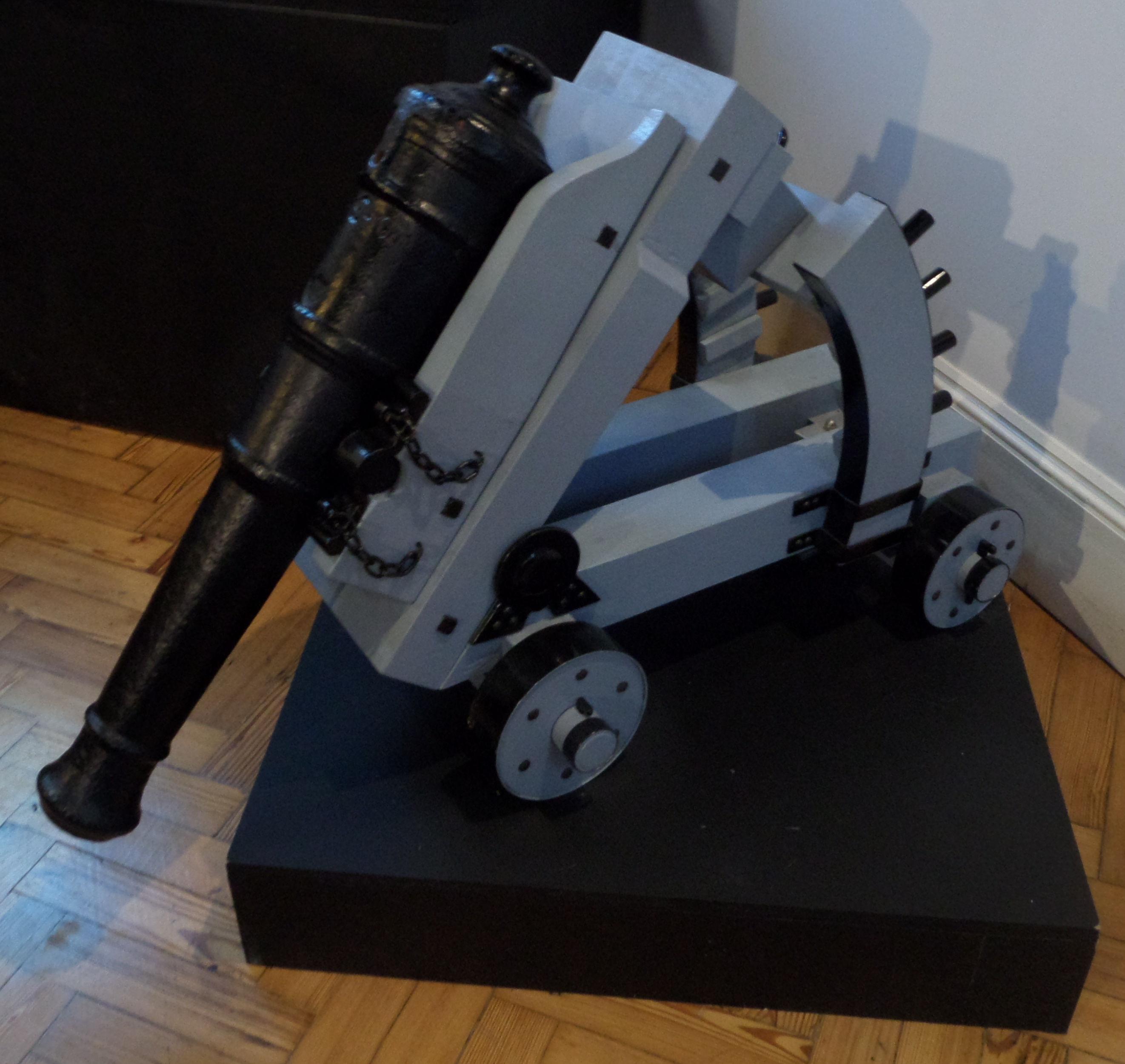
Extant example displayed at the Royal Engineers Museum, Kent

The Koehler Depressing Carriage was a novel type of gun carriage invented in 1782 by Lt George Frederick Koehler of the Royal Artillery. It was devised to enable cannon to be fired at a steeply downward-facing angle and was made necessary by the peculiar circumstances that the British Army faced during the Great Siege of Gibraltar between 1779 and 1783. The carriage saw active service during the siege, when it was used to support the British counter-bombardment of Spanish and French artillery batteries during the successful defence of Gibraltar. Its success made Koehler famous and has been commemorated in a number of different forms over the last 230 years.

== Background ==
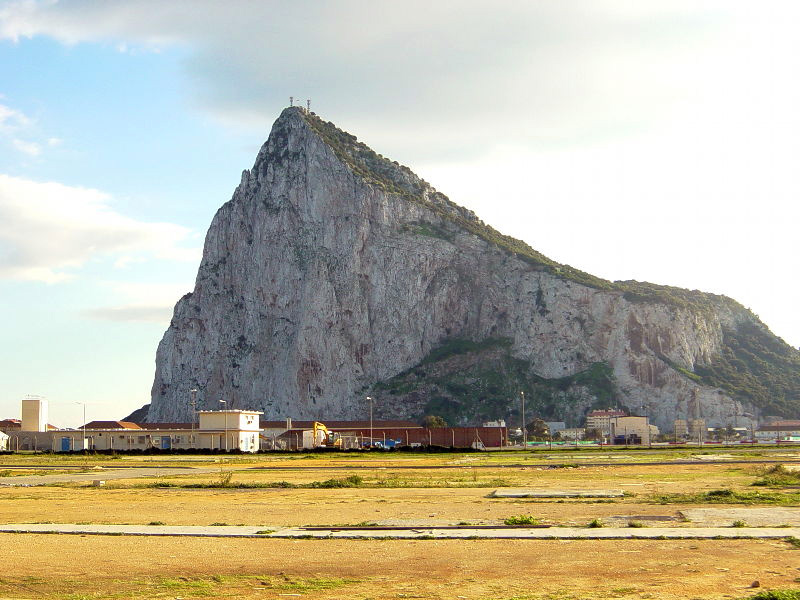
The problem that the carriage was designed to overcome: firing from the Rock of Gibraltar down into the Spanish positions below (located at the photographer's viewpoint)

During the Great Siege, the British garrison of Gibraltar faced a French and Spanish army entrenched on the low ground of the isthmus that links Gibraltar with Spain. The British controlled the high ground of the Rock of Gibraltar, which reaches a height of 411.5 metres (1,350 ft) at its north end. Although this was a major advantage for the British gunners, as it gave them an increased range and a clear view of the enemy, it also posed significant problems. Enemies close to their positions could not be targeted as existing gun carriages would not allow the amount of vertical depression required to hit such a close target. Gunners tried to deal with this by propping up the rear of the carriages, but this was a clumsy solution that fixed the guns in position. It consequently exposed them to severe danger as they had to load the guns in full view of enemy counter-fire, rather than out of sight in an embrasure or battery.

== Koehler's invention ==
Depressing carriages had been invented before – in the 15th century, a German engineer had devised a platform for a culverin that had four wheels and could be moved in two arcs for adjusting the elevation – but Koehler found a simple and effective solution that solved both the problems of elevation and recoil. It was based on an existing garrison carriage, a type of heavy gun carriage mounted on small wheels known as trucks. Koehler split the carriage in two horizontally, joining the two parts with a hinge created with a spindle at the front. This allowed the gun to be depressed to an angle of between 20 and 70 degrees. The cannonball and powder were held in place using wadding to secure them in the bore.

Koehler's design had the further advantage of absorbing the recoil caused by firing the gun. Ordinary carriages had no mechanism to absorb this recoil. The entire gun and mount would jump violently, causing the gun crew to have to reposition it before they could fire the next shot. Koehler's carriage mounted the gun on a sliding bed attached to the main body of the carriage via a vertical spindle. Firing the cannon forced the bed to slide upwards, rather than making the entire carriage recoil. As an eyewitness, John Drinkwater, noted, "the carriage, when the gun was depressed, seldom moved; the gun sliding upon the plank to which it was attached by the spindle, and returning to its former place with the most trifling assistance." This system was a forerunner of the recoil systems that are standard features of modern artillery pieces. The gun could be reversed on the carriage and fired upwards at angles of up to 45°, though according to Drinkwater "in that state [it] did not particularly excel." The design also enabled gunners to reload the cannon without exposing themselves to enemy fire, by rotating the sliding bed sideways.

Depressing carriages in Gibraltar
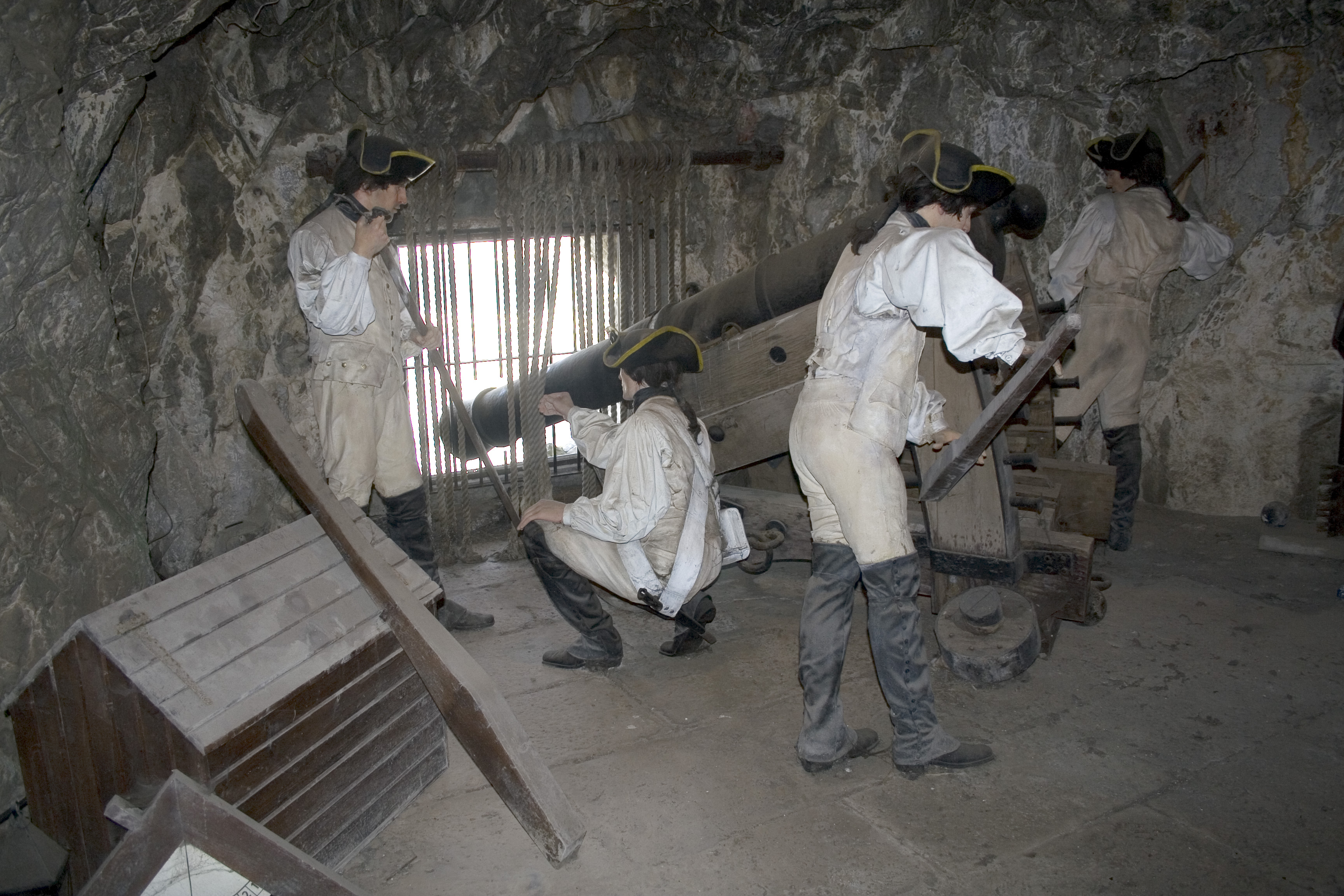
Reconstruction in the Great Siege Tunnels of British gunners using a cannon mounted on a Koehler depressing carriage

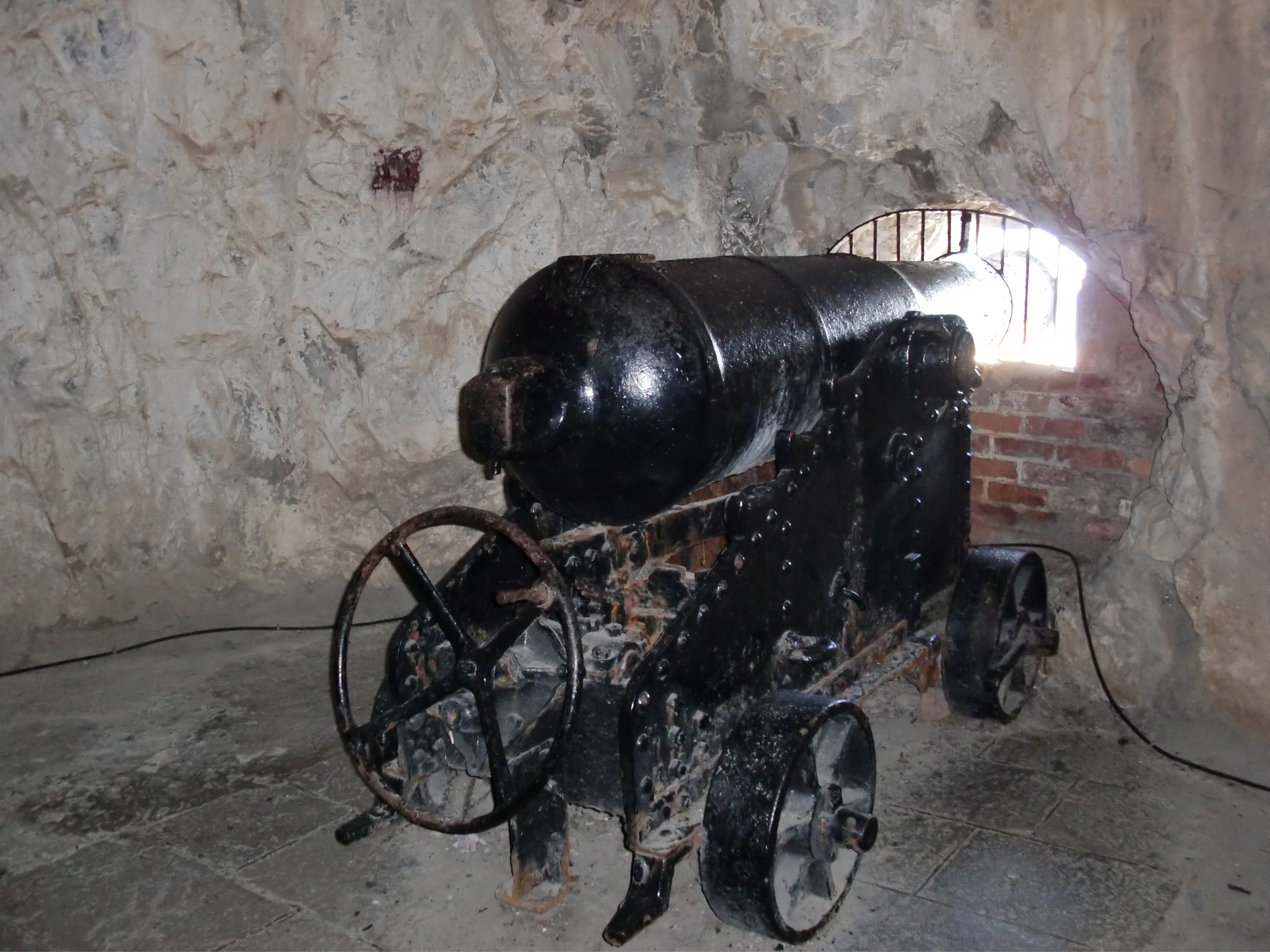
Cannon mounted on a Gibraltar garrison carriage – an 1870s refinement of Koehler's design, using a large rearward wheel to control the angle of the gun

The carriage was first put into operational use in the afternoon of 15 April 1782, when Koehler demonstrated it to the Governor of Gibraltar, General George Augustus Eliott, and other officers of the garrison. The target chosen was San Carlos Battery, a Spanish position some 1,400 yards (1,300 m) distant in the Lines of Contravallation. Drinkwater recorded that out of thirty rounds fired, twenty-eight hit the target. Koehler's carriage became a key advantage for the defenders of Gibraltar, contributing to the accuracy and speed of the British artillery, and became one of the most famous and successful examples of a special gun carriage. However, it had a significant flaw in that the angle of depression could only be adjusted in a number of large 'steps', making it difficult to aim at certain angles. This was resolved by an 1870s update to the design which saw the addition of a large wheel at the back, connected to a screw mechanism, which enabled fine tuning of the angle.

== Commemoration ==
Koehler's invention has been commemorated in numerous works of art, models, sculptures, replicas and badges. The depressing gun carriage can be seen in the bottom-left corner of a famous 1787 portrait of General Eliott by Joshua Reynolds. It is still displayed on the badge of 22 (Gibraltar) Battery Royal Artillery, and the £10 note, £1 coin and 10p coin of the Gibraltar pound have all depicted the gun carriage. A replica of a Koehler gun carriage can be seen at Grand Casemates Square in Gibraltar's city centre, while in the Great Siege Tunnels, originally dug out during the siege itself, a reconstruction can be seen of how the depressing carriage would have been used.
