= George Carter (artist) =

English artist

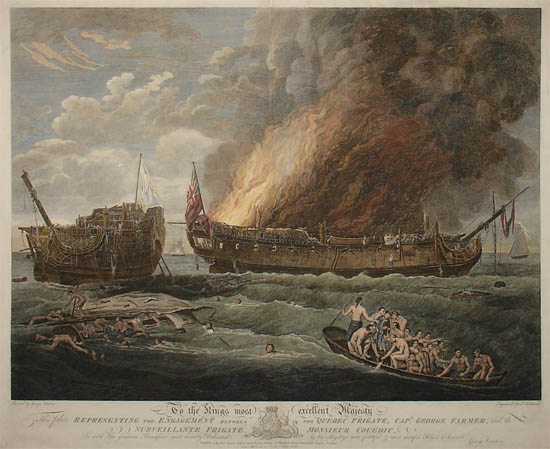
Engagement between Quebec & Surveillante, 1779, presented as a gift to George III.

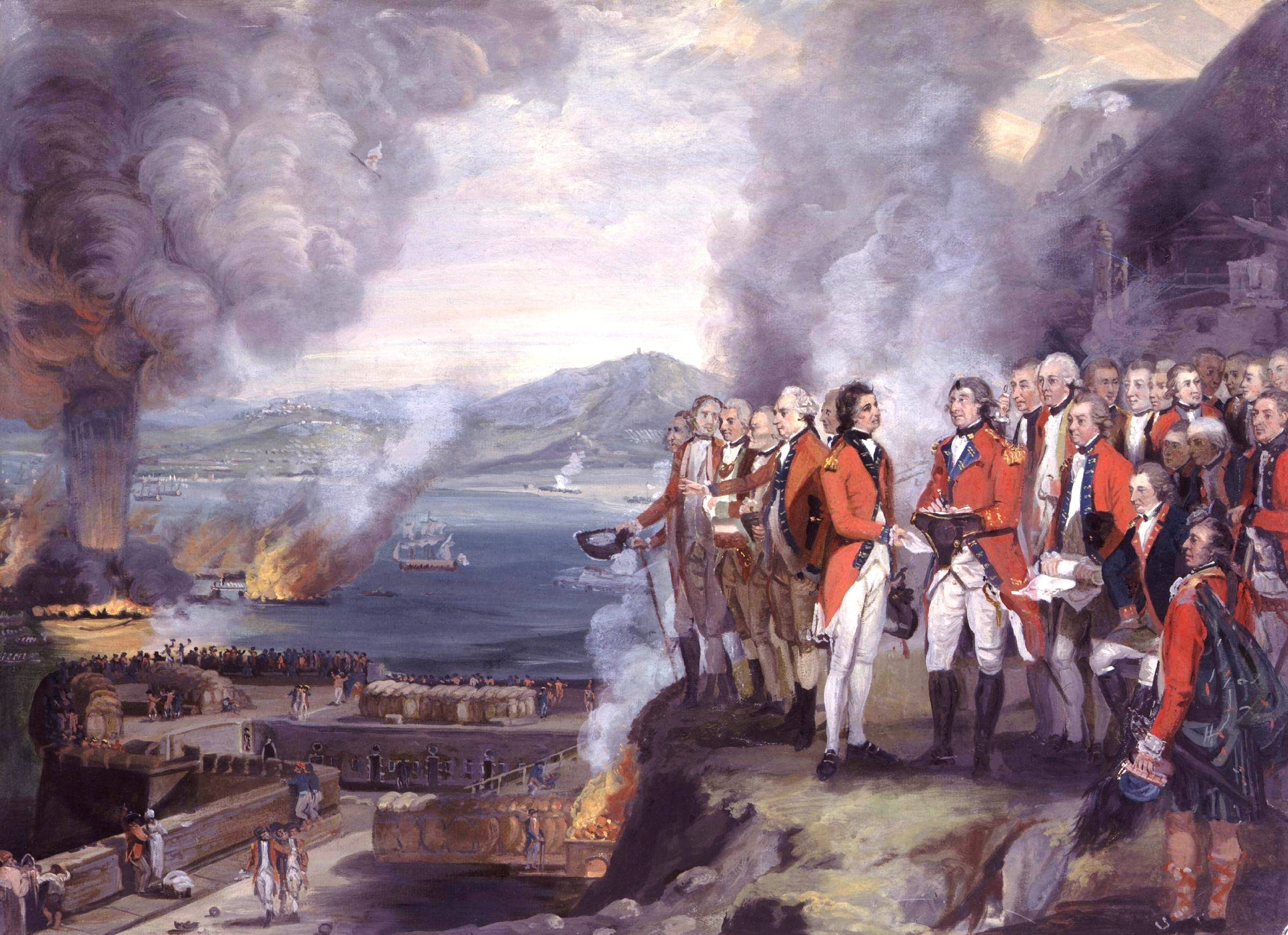
The Siege of Gibraltar, 1782, now at the National Portrait Gallery in London.

George Carter (1737–1794) was an English artist who described himself as a "historical portrait painter". He visited Italy in the company of John Singleton Copley, who had a significant influence on his work, and spent some time in India.

== Life ==
Carter was born in Colchester, where he was baptised on 10 April 1737, the son of George and Elizabeth Carter. He was educated at the free school in the town, before moving to London where he worked as a servant and then for a mercer. He went into partnership as a mercer himself in Covent Garden, but the business proved unsuccessful and Carter turned to painting.

In 1774 Carter visited France and Italy in the company of John Singleton Copley who had recently arrived in England from the United States. In a letter to his mother, Copley described Carter as "a very polite and sensible man, who has seen much of the world". However, relations between them soured during the journey, and Copley later compared him to "a sort of snail which crawled over a man in his sleep and left its slime, and no more".

Carter's dramatic portrayal of contemporary events such as the death of Captain James Cook was greatly influenced by Copley. Frederick Peter Seguier noticed what he called a "slight resemblance between George Carter's pictures of the siege of Gibraltar and some of the historical pictures of Zoffany", adding that "Carter's figures viewed as portraits are very good." The artist had visited Gibraltar in August 1784 to make portraits of the British officers involved in the action.

He exhibited at the Royal Academy between 1775 and 1784. His address is given in the first year as "at Rome"; as 21 Goodge Street in 1776, and as Margaret Street, Cavendish Square from then on. His subjects included A Weary Pilgrim on his Journey to St. Peter, The Dying Pilgrim, with a View of the Sybil's Temple at Rome and Philosophers Reasoning in Ovid's Tomb (1776); The Meeting of Isaac and Rebecca (1777); the Adoration of the Shepherds, an altarpiece for St. James's Church, Colchester (1778) and The Immortality of Garrick, with Portraits of the Principal Actors (1784). This last picture, also known as The Apotheosis of Garrick, is now in the collection of Royal Shakespeare Company. It shows its protagonist carried towards Parnassus by angels, witnessed by a crowd of the leading actors of the time, and was described by Horace Walpole as "ridiculous and bad". An engraving of the picture was issued, with a key to the individuals depicted.

In 1786 he held an exhibition of 35 of his own works in Pall Mall.

He spent some time in India. On his outward voyage he met John Hynes, a survivor of a notorious shipwreck, and in 1791 Carter published a version of his account of the incident as A Narrative of the Loss of the Grosvenor, Eastindiaman, with his own engravings, describing himself on the title page as "George Carter, Historical Portrait Painter"

He lived in Hendon later in life, and died there on 12 September 1794.
