= Gulliford Farm =

Gulliford Farmhouse
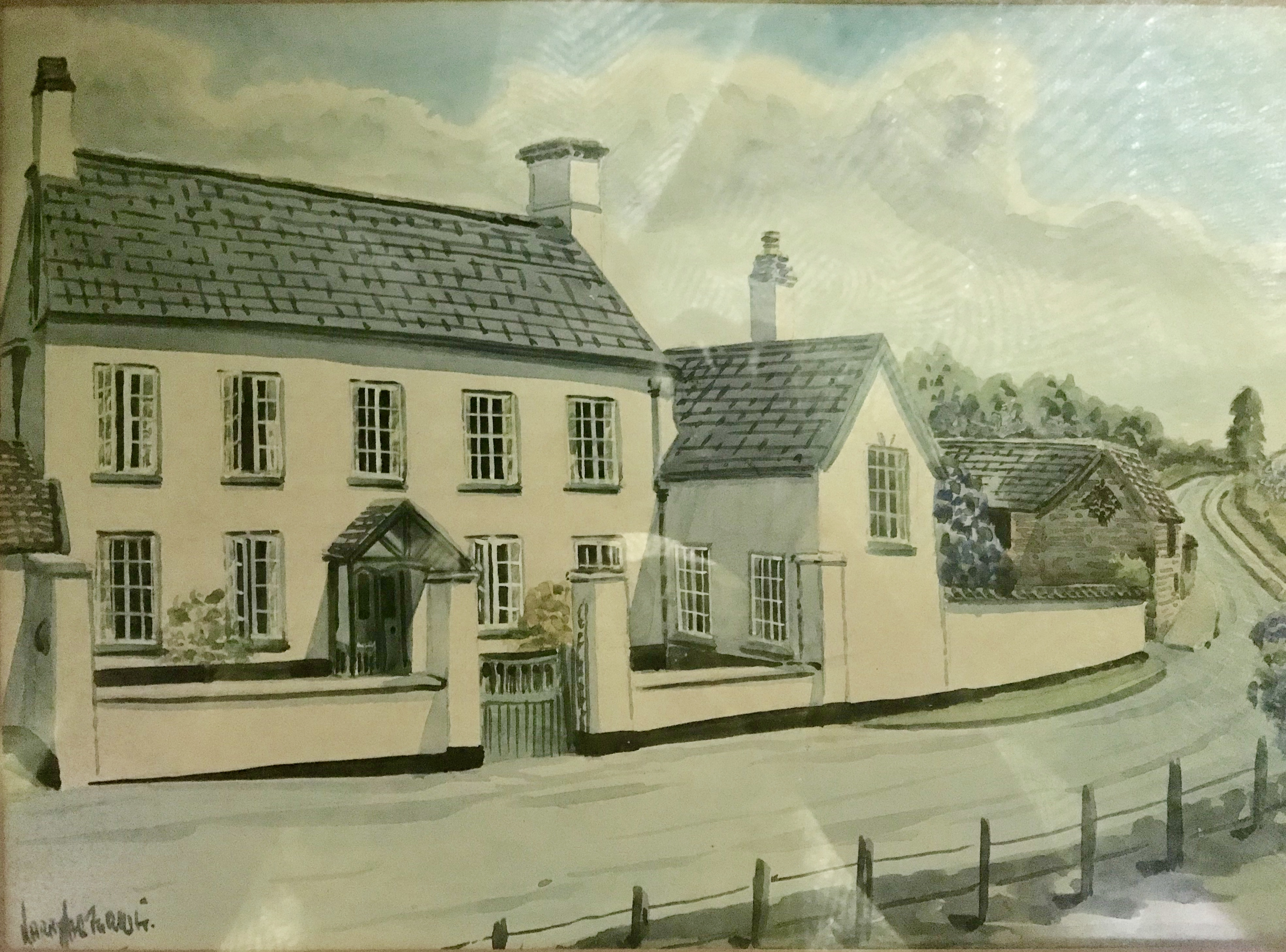
- Watercolour of Gulliford from 1955

- Location within Devon
- 50.6587°N 3.4222°W
- Type: Farmhouse
- Location: Woodbury, Devon
- OS grid reference: SX995853

History
- Built: mid to late 16th century, with later additions

Site notes
- Architectural style: vernacular

Listed Building – Grade II
- Official name: Gulliford Farmhouse, Woodbury
- Designated: 21 April 1986
- Reference no.: 1104185

Gulliford is a historic agricultural estate and Grade-II listed farmhouse in East Devon, between Exmouth and Topsham. It is situated in the village of Exton, in the parish of Woodbury. The main residential building dates to the 16th century with later Georgian and Victorian additions.

== History ==
The first mention of Gulliford Farm comes as a small dwelling in one of many small hamlets which sprung up in the area around 1300, its name deriving from Geldforde or Geldfeld, a reference to the harvests from the lands surrounding the waterways of East Devon.

The buildings which then existed were part of the Nutwell Estate, owned by the Dynham (1311–1501) and Prideaux (1520–1649) families, respectively. Through them the farm was rented and used by tenant farmers, with the largest farm remaining as Nutwell Castle itself.

In 1575, after centuries on inadequate maintenance, the 14th century buildings were torn down, and a new, large home farm and hunting lodge was built by Sir Francis Drake, 2nd Bart. It is through the second Baronet that the Drake family, mainly Sir Francis Henry Drake, 5th Baronet, would eventually possess Gulliford.

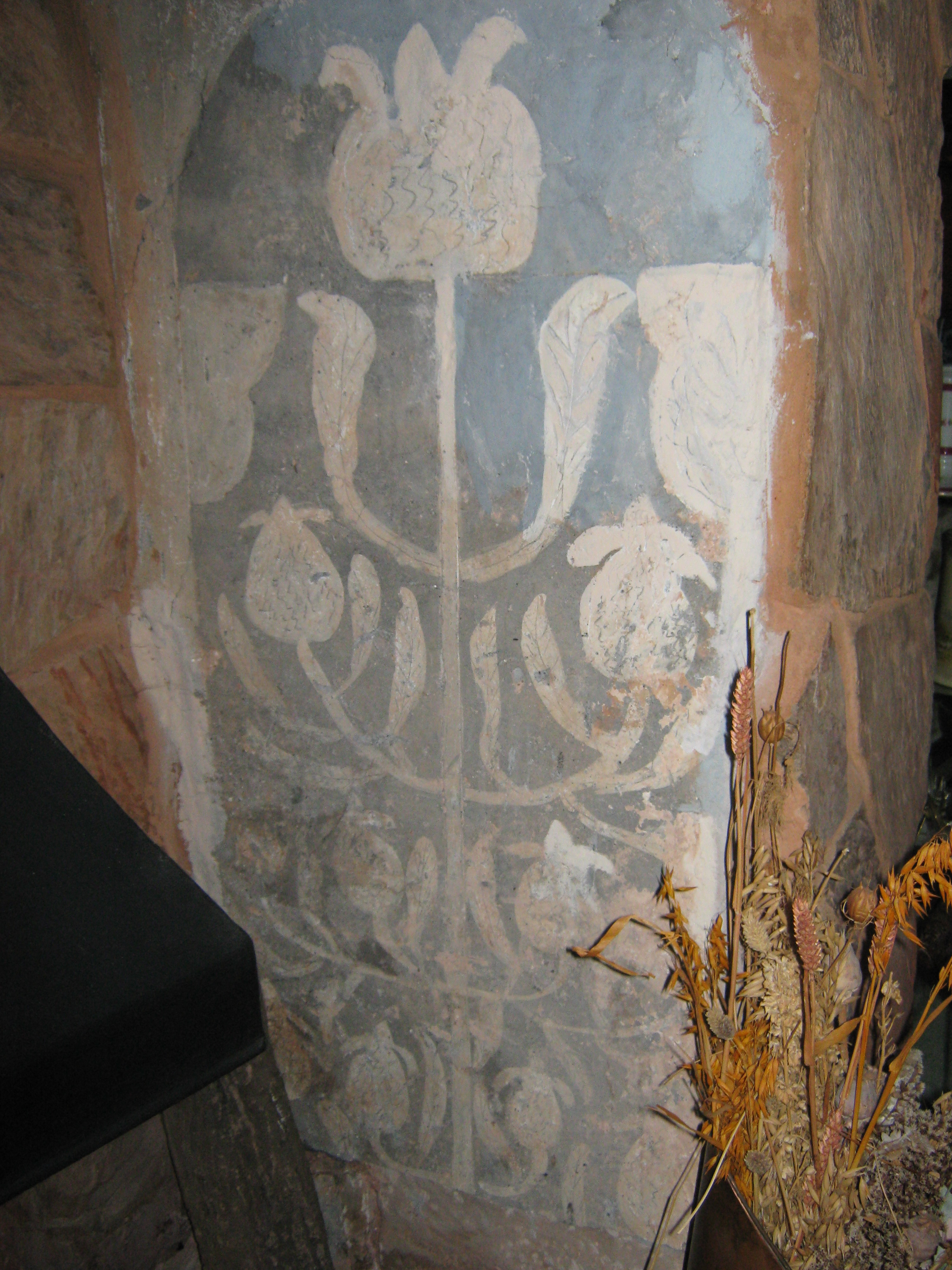
Plaster of Paris work in the Drawing Room fireplace

In 1649, Amias Prideaux sold Gulliford, as a part of the lands of Nutwell Castle, to Sir Henry Ford, whose trustees once again sold the estate following his death. At this point Sir Henry Pollexfen bought the estate, and Gulliford soon after entered the ownership of the Drake family. By 1692, Thomas Lee, a local businessman and yeoman of the parish of Woodbury, was living at Gulliford when he leased out land on the south of the estate for the construction of a nonconformist chapel.

Toward the end of the 18th century, Gulliford passed to Francis Augustus Eliott, 2nd Baron Heathfield, who was the son of the governor of Gibraltar during the American Revolutionary Wars, George Augustus Elliot, 1st Baron Heathfield.

It was the 2nd Baron Heathfield that from 1780 to 1799 destroyed all but the chapel of the original Nutwell, and rebuilt the house, whilst briefly living at Gulliford. It was at this time that the baron extended Gulliford to include the extensive brick barns and rooms in the two courtyards. These were designed to hold 'up to 30- horses for plough-sharing' and accommodation for staff and visitors. The farmhouse is a Grade II listed building. The estate was largely modernised from its traditional feudal origins under the Hallett family, collateral descendants of Lord Heathfield, from 1820 onwards. Gulliford led agricultural industrial drives in the area, hosting traction engine rallies and being one of the first estates to have a self-propelling combine harvester in England.

The estate was split up in the 20th Century. In 1925 the Eastern part of the estate, Coombe, was given to the younger son of the then owner, William Hallett. in 1950 the remaining estate was split between the two sons of the son of William Hallett, William Brook Hallett - local squire and JP. Gulliford retained the most acreage, and the remainder was established as Exton Park.

In 1979, June Hallett – the wife of the then-owner of the farm, uncovered plaster of paris frescoes on the inner walls of a fireplace in the house. The images were consequentially restored, and are believed to be the earliest known depictions of Californian Poppies. The frescoes are estimated to have been made between 1580 and 1585, immediately following Sir Francis Drake's return from his circumnavigation of the globe.

Gulliford was sold out of the family (either collateral or direct) for the first time in 500 years in 2011.
