= José de Barboza =

Captain José de Barboza
- Portrait by John Trumbull, 1788
- Born: c. 1750; Spain
- Died: 27 November 1781 (aged 30–31); Gibraltar
- Military career
- Allegiance: Spain
- Branch: Spanish Army
- Service years: –1781
- Rank: Captain
- Conflicts: American Revolutionary War; Great Siege of Gibraltar †

Captain José de Barboza (c. 1750 – 27 November 1781) was a Spanish Army officer who served in the American Revolutionary War. At some point in his life de Barboza joined the Spanish army and eventually became an officer in an artillery unit. Spain joined the Revolutionary War by declaring war on Britain on 16 June 1779 and began besieging Gibraltar eight days later. De Barboza joined the siege, in which Spanish artillery maintained a continuous bombardment of the defending British garrison, though the besiegers were unable to force the defenders to surrender.

In November 1781 the besiegers made plans to launch a massive human wave attack, though the British were informed of the planned attack by Spanish deserters. The defenders responded by launched a pre-emptive sortie on 27 November, sending 2,534 British and Hanoverian troops in three columns to attack the forward Spanish positions. At the time of the sortie de Barboza was commanding the troops guarding the San Carlos battery, which was host to several large mortars. De Barboza's troops fled when Hanoverian troops attacked his post, though he charged at the attackers alone, exclaiming "At least one Spaniard shall die honourably!" and was mortally wounded.

General George Eliott, the governor of Gibraltar and commander of the sortie, came across de Barboza while his troops were destroying the San Carlos battery. Eliott recognised de Barboza's rank and unit from his uniform and "spoke with all kindness, and promising him every assistance, ordered him to be removed, as the fire was rapidly spreading to the spot where he lay." However de Barboza refused Eliott's offer of assistance and lifting himself up with difficulty "feebly exclaimed": "No, sir, no, leave me and let me perish amid the ruins of my post." De Barboza died a few minutes later. In 1789 the American painter John Trumbull included de Barboza in his painting The Sortie Made by the Garrison of Gibraltar. Trumbull later justified his inclusion of de Barboza by arguing that he wished to celebrate "noble and generous actions, by whomsoever performed".
