= Nutwell =

Historic manor in Devon, England

Coordinates: 50.6561°N 3.4333°W

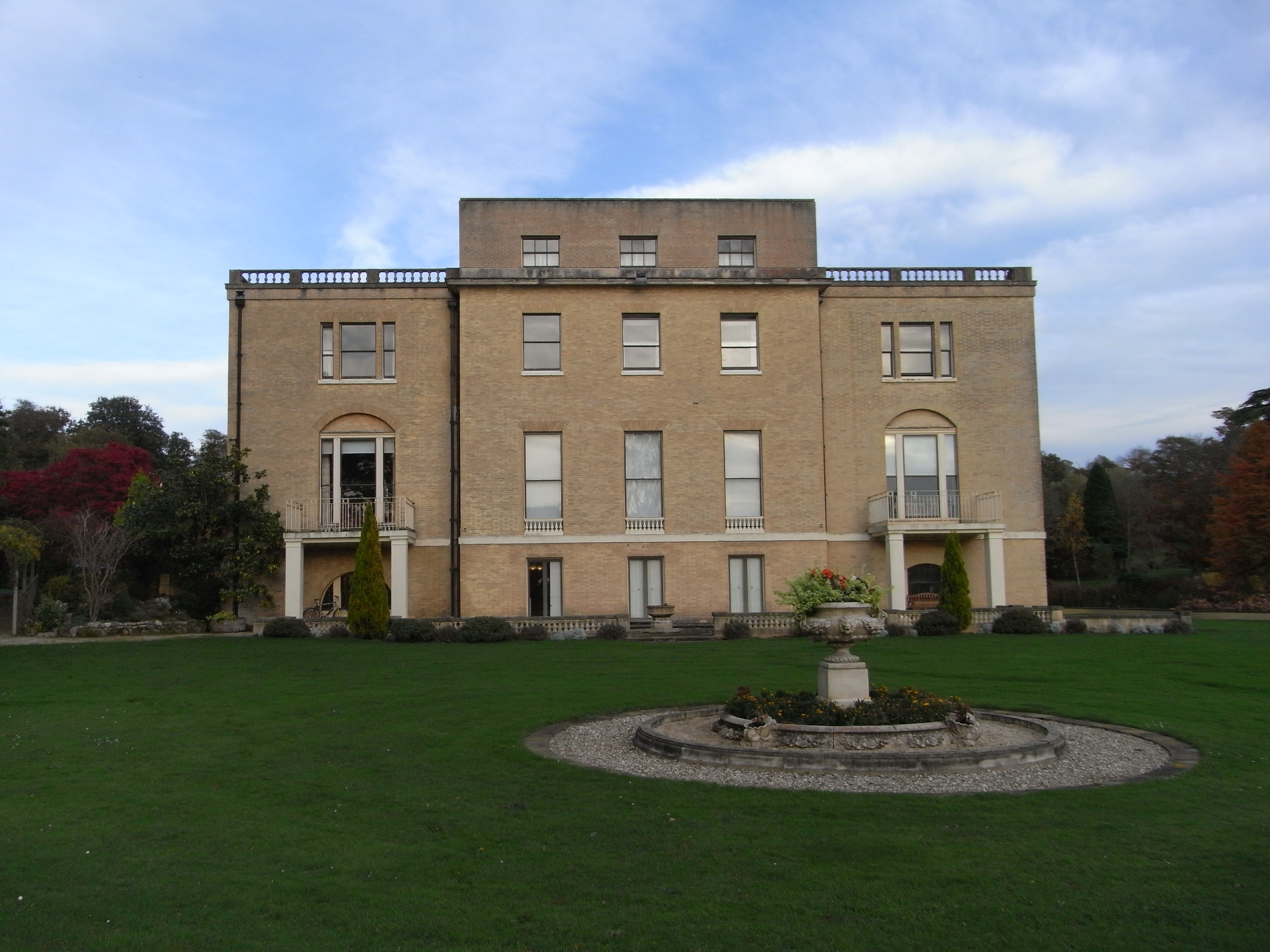
Nutwell Court in the parish of Woodbury, Devon. The "exquisitely precise and austere neo-classical mansion" rebuilt in 1799. West front (River Exe front)

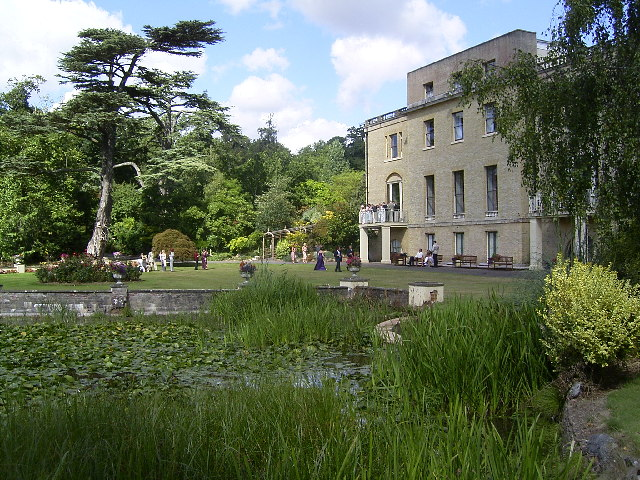
Nutwell Court, built circa 1800 by Francis Augustus Eliott, 2nd Baron Heathfield (1750–1813), on the site of an earlier house

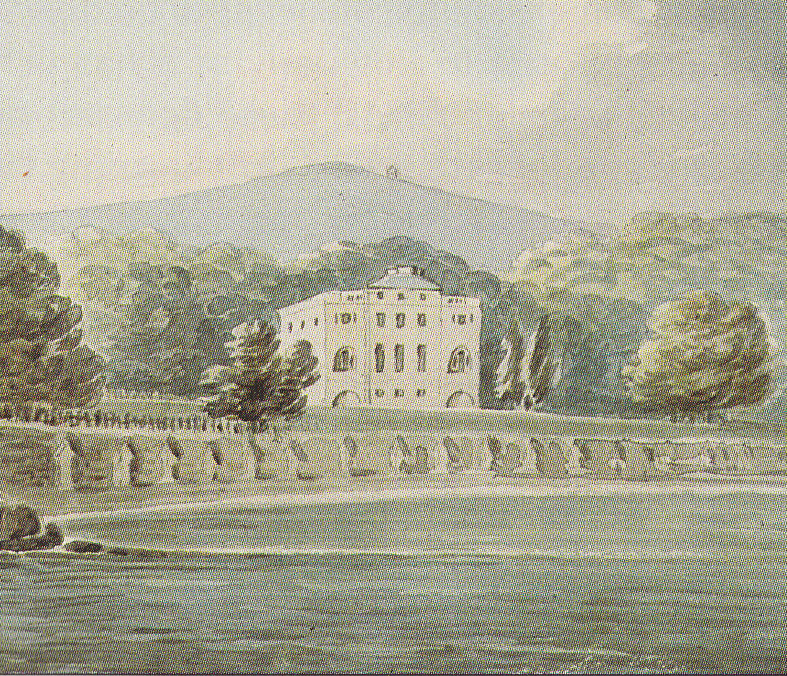
The newly rebuilt Nutwell Court as painted by Rev. John Swete (d.1821) during his travels of May 1799. Viewed from River Exe estuary

Nutwell in the parish of Woodbury on the south coast of Devon is a historic manor and the site of a Georgian neo-classical Grade II* listed mansion house known as Nutwell Court. The house is situated on the east bank of the estuary of the River Exe, on low-lying ground nearly contiguous to the water, and almost facing Powderham Castle similarly sited on the west bank. The manor was long held by the powerful Dynham family, which also held adjacent Lympstone, and was according to Risdon the site of their castle until John Dynham, 1st Baron Dynham (1433–1501), the last in the male line, converted it into "a fair and stately dwelling house".

== Descent of the manor ==
=== Domesday Book ===
In the Domesday Book of 1086 Noteswille was held in chief by one of King William II's thanes named Donne (or "Dunn"), who also held from the king the manor of Newton St Cyres.

=== Dynham ===
Arms of Dynham: Gules, four fusils in fess ermine

The manor of Nutwell, together with nearby Harpford, were granted by King Henry I (1100–1135) to Geoffrey I, Sire de Dinan, near St Malo in Brittany. In 1122 Geoffrey granted Nutwell and Harpwell to the Abbey of Marmoutier at Tours for the benefit of the dependent priory of St Malo at Dinan. The grant was jointly made with his sons, including his eldest son Oliver I de Dinan (died 1150) and was confirmed by his wife Orieldis. Oliver I's eldest two sons Geoffrey II and Oliver II, co-founded Hartland Abbey in 1168/9. Nutwell descended to Geoffrey I's grandson Rolland de Dinan, lord of Bécherel Castle, (about 20 km SE of Dinan) the son and heir of Geoffrey I's younger son Alan de Dinan (died 1159). Nutwell was described as "land of Rolland de Dinan" in 1168, but had been taken into the king's hands and produced revenue for the royal exchequer of 14s, accounted for by the Sheriff of Devon.

- Oliver de Dinham, 1st Baron Dynham (1234–1299). In 1272/3 he bought back the manors of Nutwell and Harpford from the Abbey of Marmoutier. His Inquisition post mortem held in 1299 determined that he held the manors of Nutwell, Hartland and Harpford for 2/3rds of a knight's fee. He was granted at some time before 1270 by Isolda de Cardinham the feudal barony of Cardinham in Cornwall and also Bodardle, stated in some records to be a separate barony.
- Josce de Dynham (1273–1301), at the time of his death he was holding Nutwell ("Nottewill"), Hartland, Harpford and the Somerset manor of Buckland in chief for the service of one knight's fee.
- John Dynham (1295–1332), born at Nutwell
- John Dynham (1318–1383). The chapel at Nutwell was licensed in 1371
- Sir John Dinham (1359–1428), whose effigy survives in St Mary's Church, Kingskerswell.
- Sir John Dinham (1406–1458), (son) died at Nutwell.
- John Dynham, 1st Baron Dynham (1433–1501), (son) KG, Sheriff of Devon, created Baron Dynham in 1467. He is said by Risdon to have inherited Nutwell in the form of a castle and to have converted it into "a fair and stately dwelling house". During the Wars of the Roses and after the Yorkists were defeated at the Battle of Ludlow on 12 October 1459, The Duke of York's eldest son, Edward Earl of March with the Earls of Warwick and his father the Earl of Salisbury, came into Devon guided by Dynham and were hidden by Dynham's mother at Nutwell, until Dynham had found a ship to convey them from Exmouth to safety at Calais. Lord Dynham died without issue as did his brothers and his co-heirs were thus his four sisters. Nutwell was the share of his second (or third) sister Joan de Dinan, wife of John la Zouche, 7th Baron Zouche, 8th Baron St Maur (1459–1526), who sold it, together with adjoining Lympstone, to John Prideaux (died 1558).

=== Prideaux ===
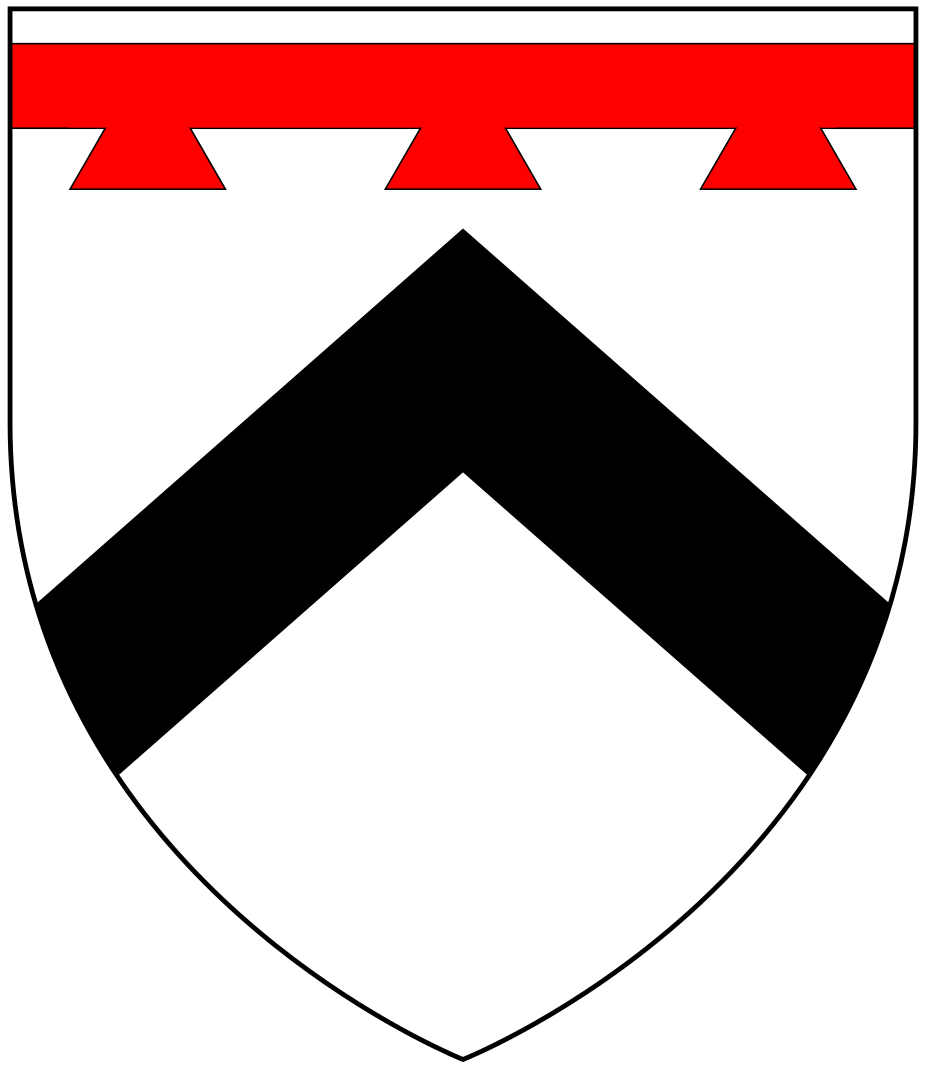
Arms of Prideaux: Argent, a chevron sable in chief a label of three points gules

==== John Prideaux (1520–1558) ====
Nutwell was purchased by John Prideaux (1520–1558), MP for Devon in 1554 and a Serjeant-at-law. He married (as her 2nd husband) Mary Stucley, a daughter of Sir Hugh Stucley (1496–1559) of Affeton, Devon, Sheriff of Devon in 1545. A monument thought to date from the late 16th century survives in Woodbury Church showing on a tomb chest two recumbent figures said to be of a Prideaux and his wife.

==== Thomas Prideaux (1549–1605) ====
His son and heir was Thomas Prideaux (1549–1605) of Nutwell, buried at Woodbury. He married Margaret Cooper, daughter of Richard Cooper of Winscombe, Somerset.

==== Sir Thomas Prideaux (1575–1641) ====
Sir Thomas Prideaux (1575–1641), son and heir, of Nutwell, also buried at Woodbury. He married Joane Cole (1579–1631), daughter and co-heiress of John Cole (1552–1582) of Buckland-Tout-Saints, Devon.

==== Amias Prideaux (died 1667) ====
Amias Prideaux (died 1667), son and heir, who married Sarah Ford, whose father's name is not known. He died without issue, having sold Nutwell.

=== Ford ===
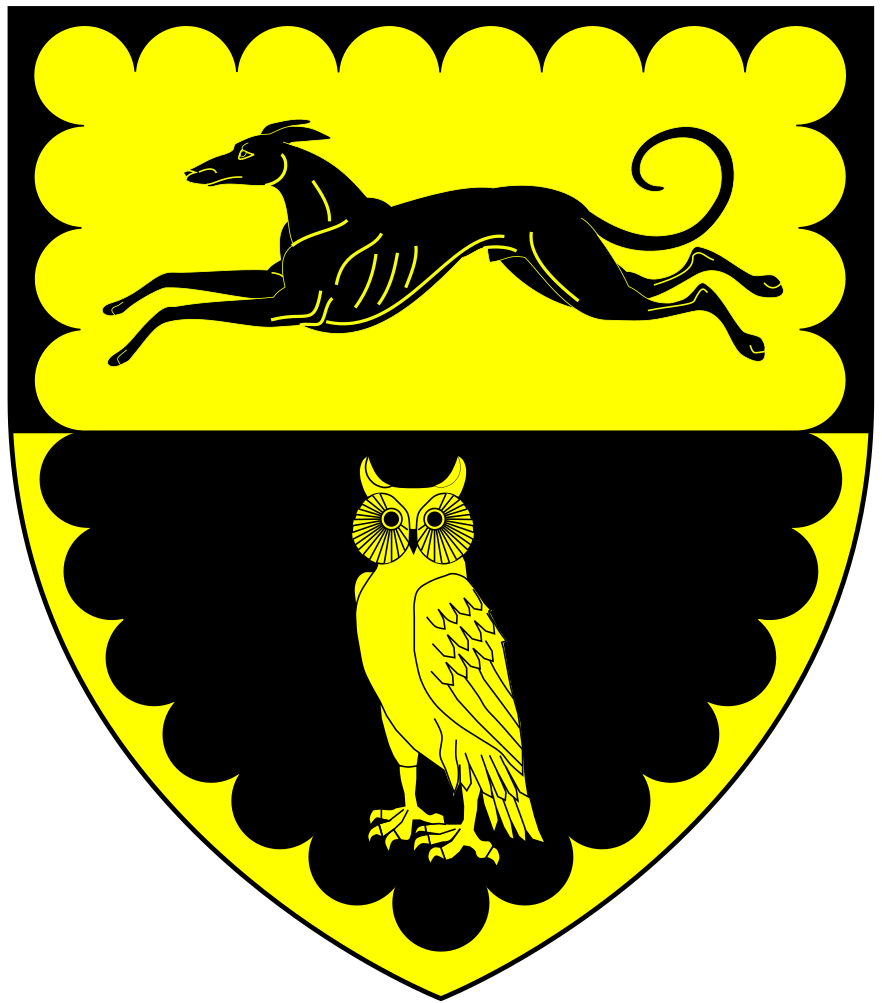
Arms of Ford of Nutwell: Party per fesse or and sable, in chief a greyhound courant in base an owl within a bordure engrailed all counter-changed

Nutwell was purchased in 1649 for £6,050 by Sir Henry Ford (1617–1684), four times MP for Tiverton between 1664 and 1685 and twice Secretary to the Lord Lieutenant of Ireland, 1669–1670 and 1672–1673. His great uncle was the playwright John Ford (1586 – c. 1639). His great-great-grandfather was John Ford (died 1538) of Ashburton (the son and heir of William Ford of Chagford,) who purchased the estate of Bagtor in the parish of Ilsington, which his male heirs successively made their seat. The Elizabethan mansion of the Fords survives today at Bagtor as the service wing of a later house appended in about 1700. Nutwell was sold by his executors in 1685.

=== Pollexfen ===
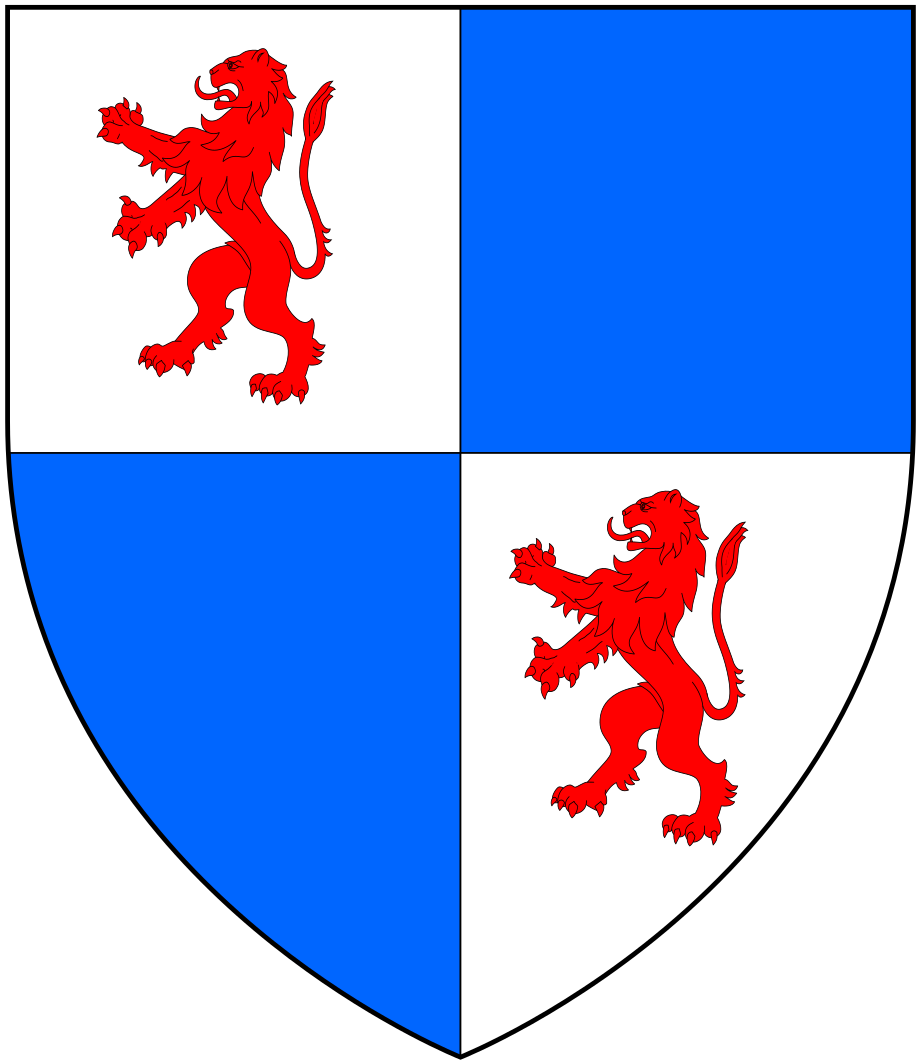
Arms of Pollexfen: Quarterly argent and azure, in the 1 and 4 quarter a lion rampant gules

After Sir Henry Ford's death his trustees were directed by his will to raise £1,000 for his daughters' marriage portions and his trustee John Kelland, MP, sold Nutwell for £6,318 to Sir Henry Pollexfen (1632–1691), Lord Chief Justice of the Common Pleas, who was buried at Woodbury. A slab from 1690 in Woodbury Church showing the Pollexfen arms Quarterly argent and azure, in the 1st and 4th quarter a lion rampant gules was drawn by the Devon diarist and antiquarian Orlando Hutchinson.

The senior branch of the Pollexfen family, from which Sir Henry was descended, was seated at Kitley, in the parish of Yealmpton, Devon. His son and heir was Henry Pollexfen (died 1732) of Nutwell, who married in 1699 Gertrude Drake, daughter of Sir Francis Drake, 3rd Baronet (1642 - 1718) of Buckland Abbey, by his 1st wife Dorothy Bampfield (died 1679) wife. Sir Francis had married as his third wife Elizabeth Pollexfen, Henry's sister.

=== Drake ===
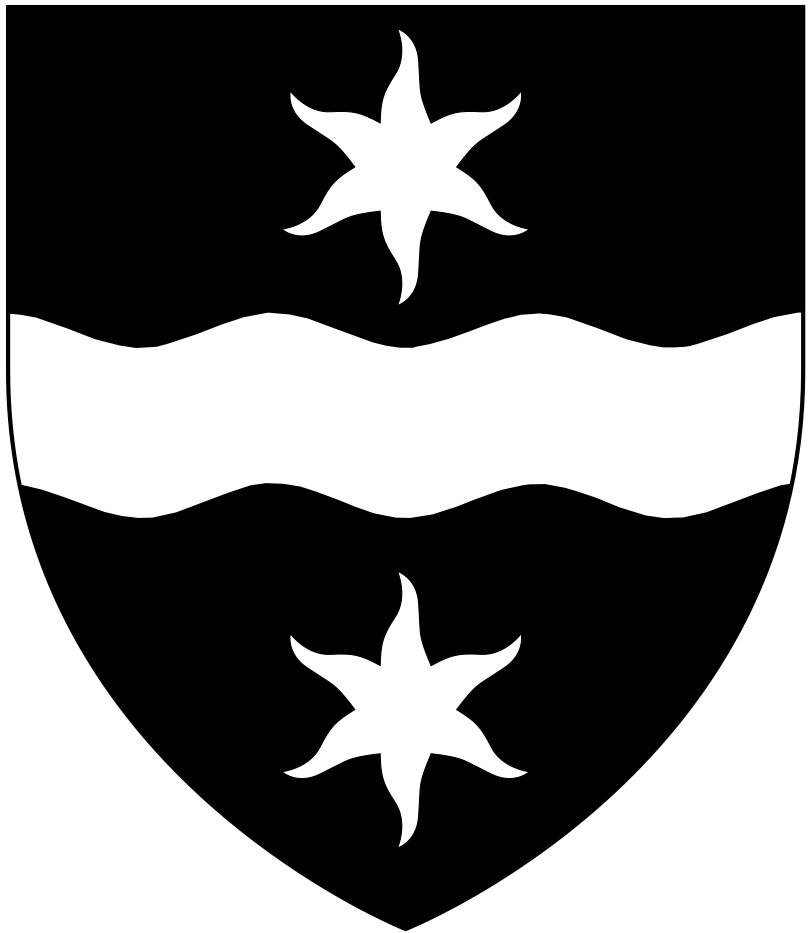
Arms of Drake of Buckland Abbey & Nutwell: Sable, a fess wavy between two estoiles argent

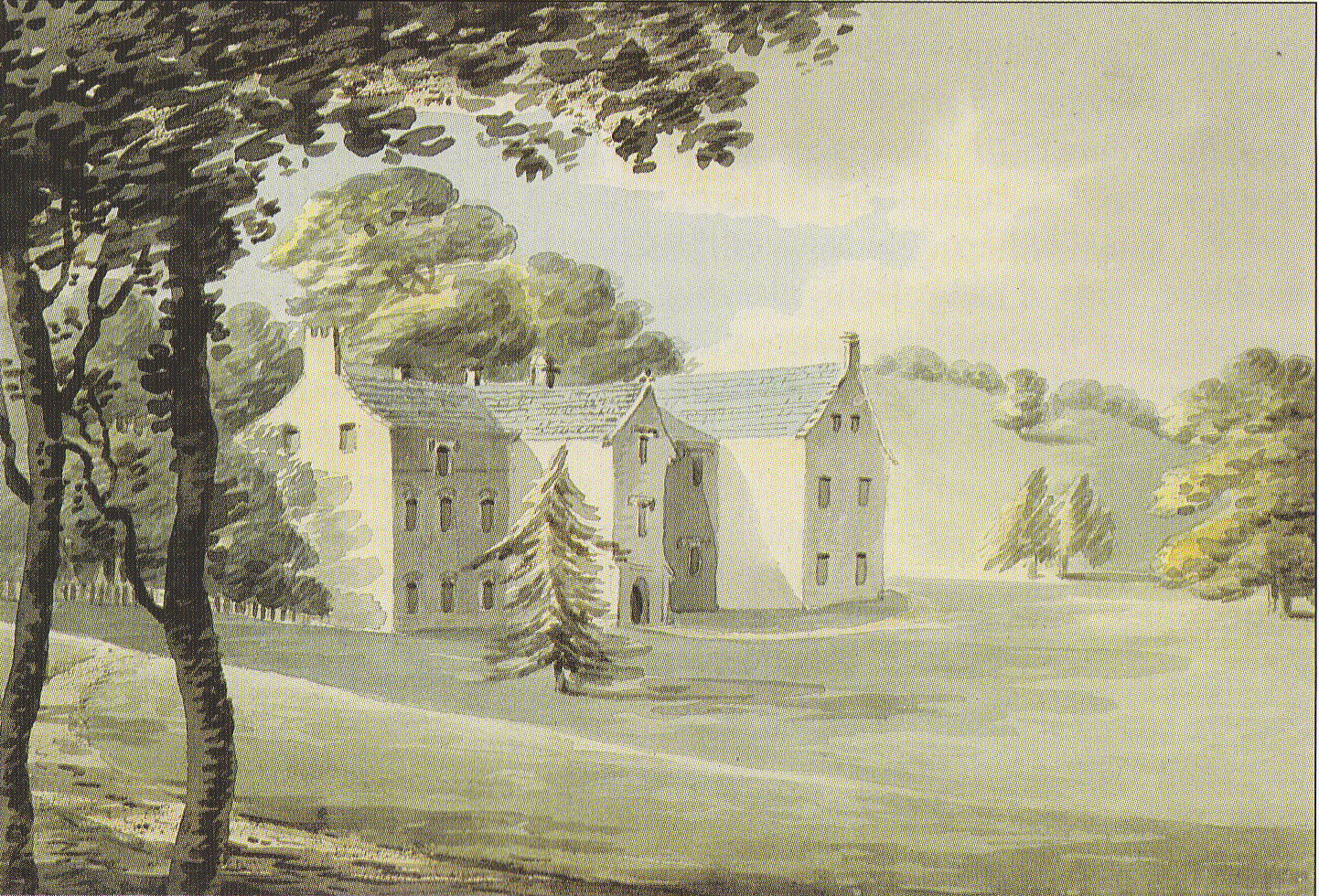
"Old Nutwell, seat of late Sir Francis Drake". Undated watercolour by Rev. John Swete (died 1821) made before 1799 when the present neo-classical house was built in its place

Nutwell descended into the Drake family of Buckland. The last in the male line Sir Francis Drake, 5th Baronet (1723–1794) is said by Hoskins (1954) "to have wrecked the fine medieval house with his improvements demolishing the two-storied gatehouse with great difficulty in 1755-6 and cutting through the timbered roof of the 14th century chapel to make a plaster ceiling". The Devon topographer Rev. John Swete visited Nutwell while the Drake era house was still standing and made at least four watercolour paintings of it and one of the gothic chapel. He described the 5th Baronet thus: "Though refined in his manners and from his appointment at court versed in the fashionable world, he was yet one of the shyest men; very few of the principal gentlemen of the county had any acquaintance with him and not many knew him personally". The 5th and last Drake baronet bequeathed almost his whole fortune, including his lands, to his nephew Francis Augustus Eliott, 2nd Baron Heathfield (1750–1813), the son of his sister Anne Pollexfen Drake (1726–1772) and her husband the hero of Gibraltar George Augustus Eliott, 1st Baron Heathfield (1717–1790).

=== Eliott ===
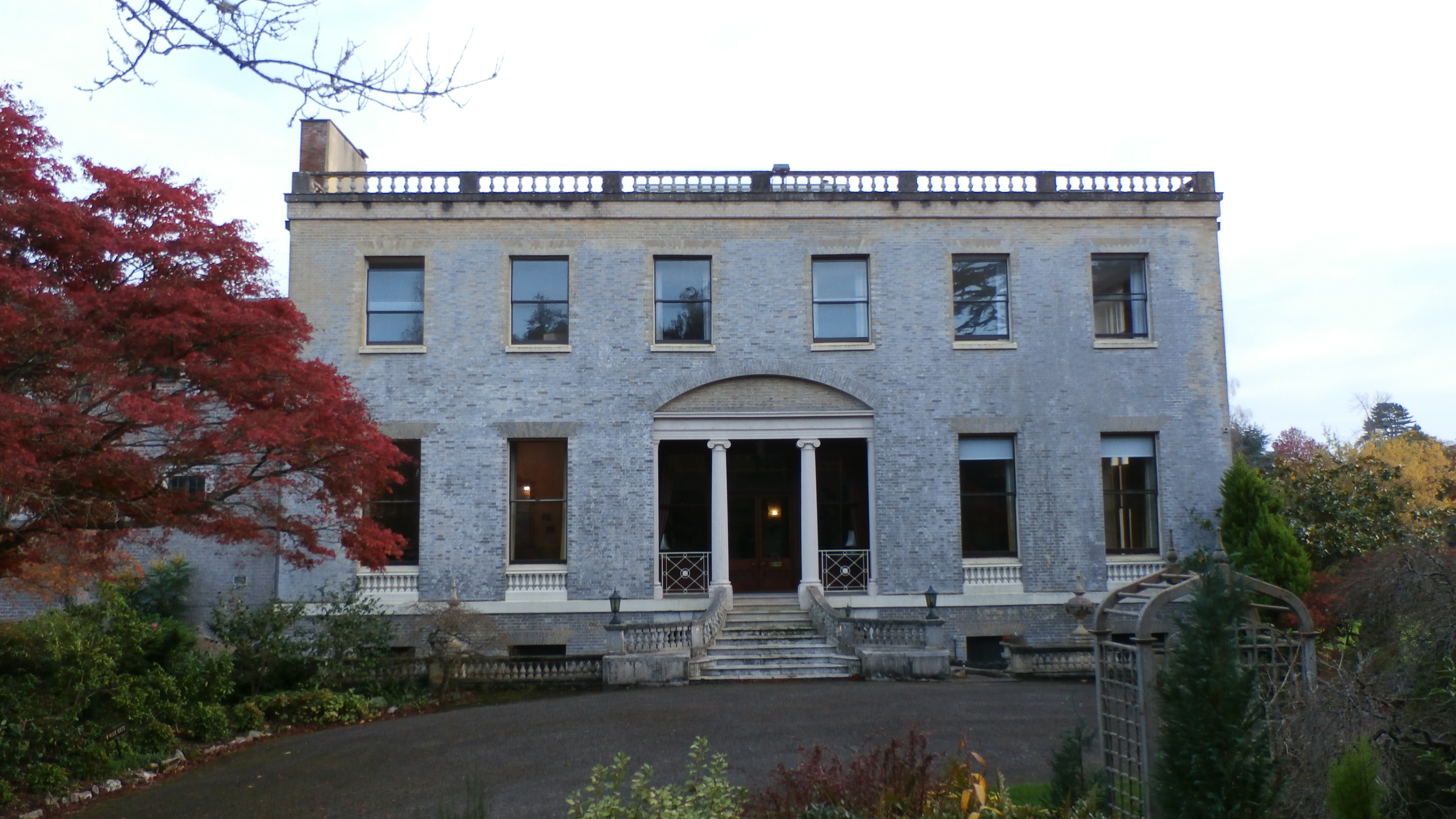
Nutwell Court, north front rebuilt in 1799

The 2nd Baron Heathfield largely pulled down the old house and built in its place a neo-classical house faced with tiles imitating Portland stone. In May 1799 Swete again visited Nutwell, made a painting of the new house, and recorded in his journal "the new mansion erected by the present proprietor Lord Heathfield, tho' yet unfinished exhibits itself most charmingly to the view" He described him as equally defensive of his privacy as his uncle Sir Francis Drake, denying access to Nutwell and its grounds to neighbours and strangers alike. Lord Heathfield's visits to Nutwell were said to be "seldom and of short duration" Heathfield died unmarried and without progeny.

=== Fuller-Eliott-Drake ===
The 2nd baron's sister was Anne Eliott (1754–1835), who married John Trayton Fuller of Ashdown House. Their son and heir was the soldier Sir Thomas Fuller-Eliott-Drake, 1st Baronet (1785–1870), who assumed the additional names of Eliott and Drake and was created a baronet, with special remainder, in 1821. He was succeeded according to the special remainder by his nephew, Sir Francis George Augustus Fuller-Eliott-Drake, 2nd Baronet (1837–1916), a son of the younger of his two brothers, who had also adopted the additional surnames. In 1861 the 2nd Baronet married Elizabeth Douglas (1840–1923) (then resident at Burslesdon House in Dawlish, Devon), a daughter of Sir Robert Andrews Douglas, 2nd Baronet of Glenbervie. She was an historian who wrote (as "Lady Eliott-Drake") The Family and Heirs of Sir Francis Drake (1911). In 1874 the 2nd Baronet, having suffered from mental ill health for 6 years, was admitted to Ticehurst Asylum in Sussex, where he lived until his death in 1916. He was buried at Buckland Monachorum, his widow staying on at Nutwell until her death in 1923. The title became extinct upon his death without a male heir. The second Baronet's only child Elizabeth Fuller-Eliott-Drake married John Eliott-Drake-Colborne, 3rd Baron Seaton (1854–1933), who also adopted the surnames Eliott and Drake.

== Nutwell Chapel ==
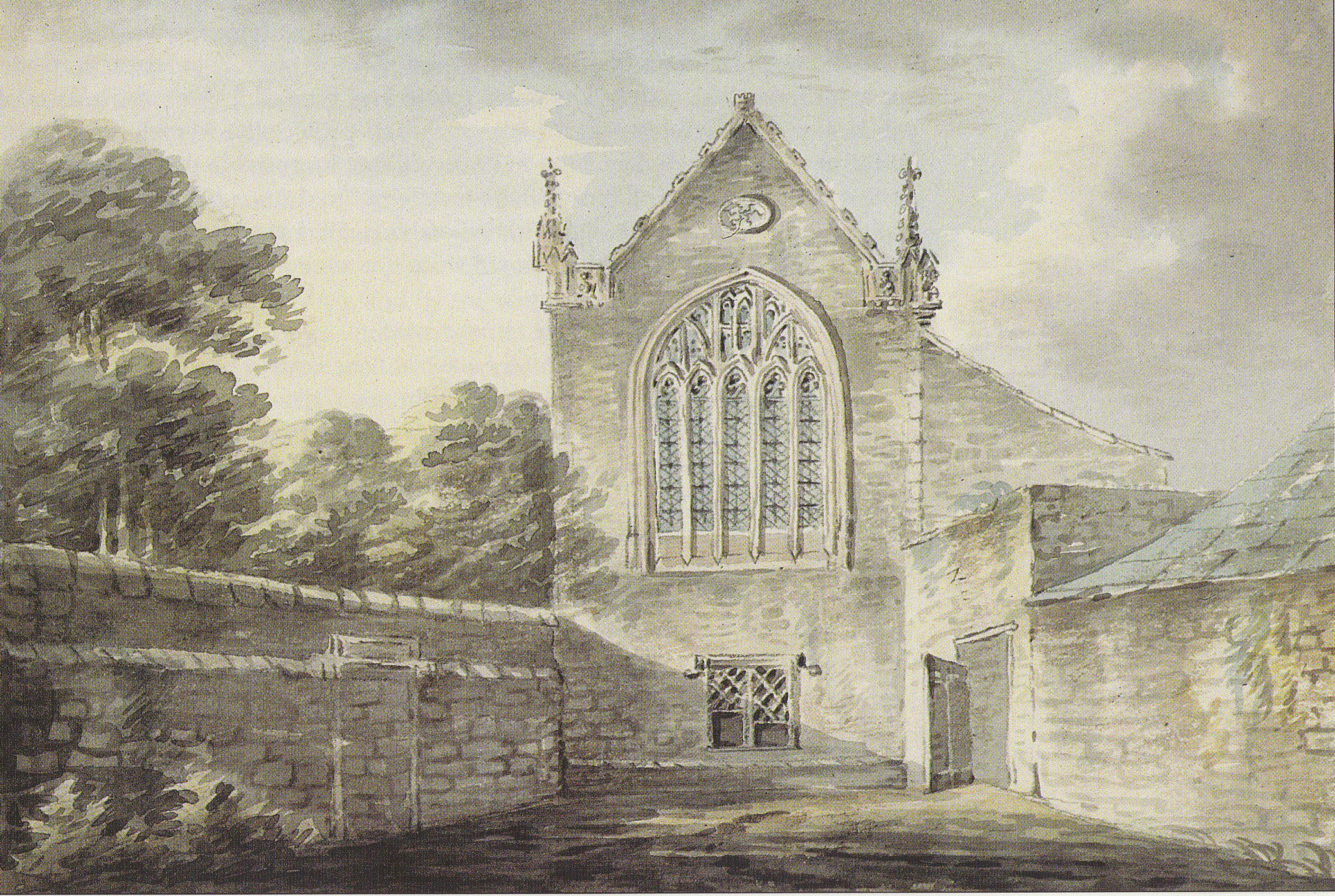
The 14th-century Nutwell Chapel. Watercolour of east window by Rev. John Swete (d.1821) made before 1799 when it was incorporated into the present neo-classical Nutwell Court

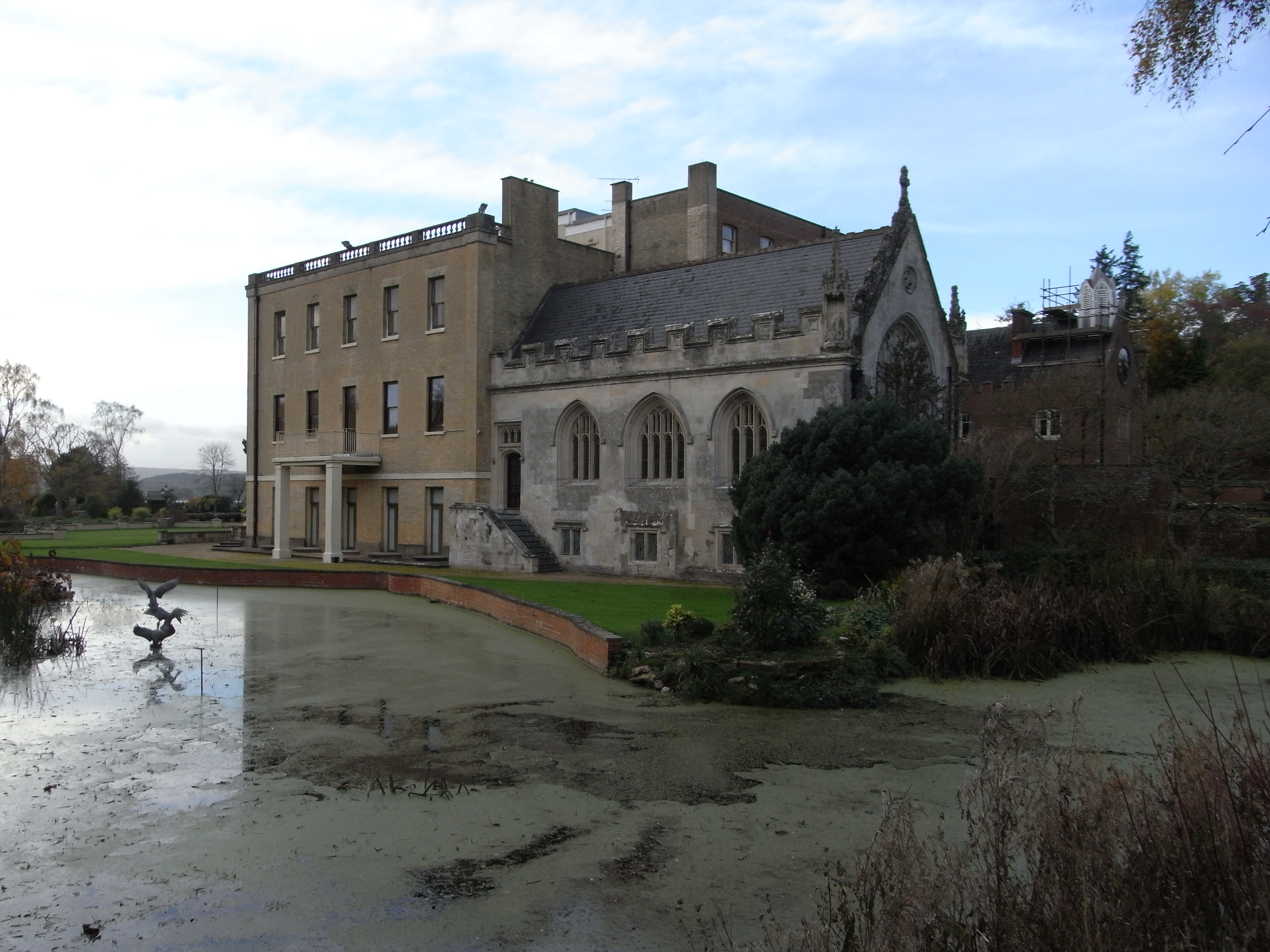
Nutwell Court, view from south-east showing south facade of 1799 rebuilt Georgian house and mediaeval chapel of the Dinham family

In 1371 a licence for a chapel at Nutwell was obtained from the Bishop of Exeter by John Dynham (1318–1383). It was converted into a library by Sir Francis Drake, 5th Baronet (1723–1794) which involved "cutting through the timbered roof...to make a plaster ceiling". Polwhele considered that this was one of his "improvement" which resulted in the creation of a "handsome library", but to Swete it was "an unwarrantable desecration". The chapel survives attached to the present neo-classical building, in a position slightly recessed from the south front and extending eastward. It has undergone considerable restorations. The south side contains four bays, the most westerly being for a first floor arched entrance door reached via an external staircase. The crypt underneath has square headed windows whilst the walls of the chapel above were given in the 19th century three gothic style pointed windows. The parapet above is crenellated and on the merlons survive weathered sculpted reliefs of the Dinham arms. Swete's watercolour of the east end shows the surviving arrangement of crocketed finials projecting outward on corbels over the string course with canopied niches containing much weathered statues of St George and the Archangel Michael. The north wall is topped for only part of its length with a crenellated parapet. Fragments of 14th-century stained glass, showing three figures, survive in the present chapel anteroom.

== Dower House ==
The former Dower House for Nutwell Court, Belvedere, is a Grade II listed castellated building on Burgmanns Hill. The former manor farm of Nutwell, Gulliford Farm, still exists about half a mile south-east of the property. Its stable block and north wing were built at the same time as Nutwell's riding school and surrounding wall.

== Sources ==
- Pevsner, Nikolaus & Cherry, Bridget, The Buildings of England: Devon, London, 2004
- Prince, John, (1643–1723) The Worthies of Devon, 1810 edition
- Hoskins, W.G., A New Survey of England: Devon, London, 1959 (first published 1954)
- Risdon, Tristram (died 1640), Survey of Devon, 1810 edition, London, 1810
- Gray, Todd & Rowe, Margery (Eds.), Travels in Georgian Devon: The Illustrated Journals of The Reverend John Swete, 1789–1800, 4 vols., Tiverton, 1999
- Thorn, Caroline & Frank, (eds.) Domesday Book, (Morris, John, gen.ed.) Vol. 9, Devon, Parts 1 & 2, Phillimore Press, Chichester, 1985.
- Vivian, Lt.Col. J.L., (Ed.) The Visitations of the County of Devon: Comprising the Heralds' Visitations of 1531, 1564 & 1620, Exeter, 1895.
