= Eliott baronets =

Baronetcy in the Baronetage of Nova Scotia

- Escutcheon of the Eliott baronets of Stobs
- Creation date: 1666
- Status: extant
- Seat(s): Stobs Castle, Roxburghshire
- Motto: Soyez sage, Be wise

The Eliott Baronetcy, of Stobs in the County of Roxburgh, is a title in the Baronetage of Nova Scotia. It was created on 3 December 1666 for Gilbert Eliott. The second baronet was a member of the pre-union Parliament of Scotland. The third Baronet sat as Member of Parliament for Roxburghshire. The Eliott Baronets share a common early Elliot ancestry with the nearby Earls of Minto (Elliot). It is thought that the surname spelling differences were contrived to differentiate the branches.

George Augustus Eliott, 1st Baron Heathfield was the tenth son of the third Baronet.

== Eliott baronets, of Stobs (1666) ==
- Sir Gilbert Eliott, 1st Baronet (died 1677). Descendant of King Robert II of Scotland
- Sir William Eliott, 2nd Baronet (died 1699).
- Sir Gilbert Eliott, 3rd Baronet (died 1764)
- Sir John Eliott, 4th Baronet (1705–1767)
- Sir Francis Eliott, 5th Baronet (died 1791)
- Sir William Eliott, 6th Baronet (1767–1812)
- Sir William Francis Eliott, 7th Baronet (1793–1864)
- Sir William Eliott, 8th Baronet (1827–1910)
- Sir Arthur Eliott, 9th Baronet (1856–1916)
- Sir Gilbert Eliott, 10th Baronet (1886–1958)
- Sir Arthur Eliott, 11th Baronet (1915–1989)
- Sir Charles Eliott, 12th Baronet (1937–2014)
- Sir Rodney Eliott, 13th Baronet (born 1966)

The heir apparent is the 13th baronet's only son, Steven Charles Eliott (born 1990).

== See also ==
- Baron Heathfield
