= Gibraltar real =

Official currency of Gibraltar until 1825

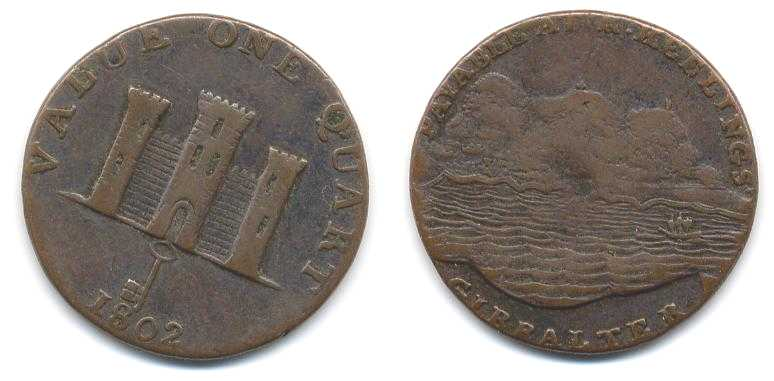
In 1802 the first merchant token to bear the name Gibraltar (albeit spelled Gibralter) was issued by Robert Keeling

The real was the official currency of Gibraltar until 1825 and continued to circulate alongside other Spanish and British currencies until 1898.

== History ==
After the Anglo-Dutch occupied Gibraltar in 1704, the Spanish real continued to circulate in the town. However, no distinction was made between the silver (de plata) and billon (de vellón) reales issued by the Spanish (1 real de plata = 2 reales de vellón before 1737, 2½ after), providing a substantial profit for the army officers making payments to troops.

In 1741, the following rates of exchange were established: 2 blancas = 1 maravedi, 4 maravedíes = 1 quarto or quart, 16 quartos = 1 real de vellón, 8 reales de vellón = 1 peso sencillo ("current" dollar), 10 reales de vellón = 1 peso fuerte ("hard" dollar, also known as the Spanish dollar). These roughly doubled the value of the real de vellón relative to its value in Spain. Much of the currency in circulation was in the form of copper coins, since the low value of silver coins relative to billon lead to most silver being exported from Gibraltar to Spain. Copper merchants' tokens denominated in quarts were issued between 1802 and 1820.

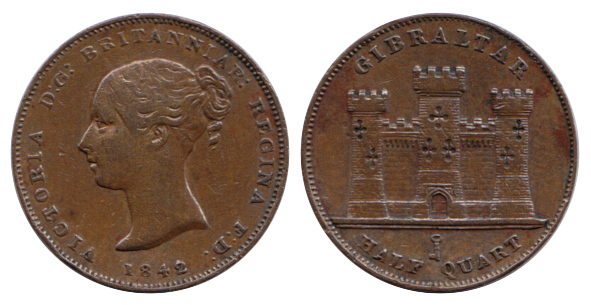
1842 Half Quart issue

In 1825, the relative values of the various circulating coins were revised and pegged to the British pound. The real de plata was subdivided into 24 quarts, valuing the real de plata at 96 maravedíes compared to 85 in Spain. The Spanish dollar was valued at 4 shillings and 4 pence and British silver coins were imported. However, because this rating of the dollar was too high, British silver coins could not circulate, although British coppers did, with an informal valuation of 1 quart = 1 farthing (actually 1 quart = 1 1/12 farthings). This discrepancy was also exploited to the profit of army officers making payments to troops.

In 1842, coins were issued in ½, 1 and 2 quarts denominations. A total of 387,072 quarts worth of coins were issued (equal to 2016 dollars or £436 16s), allowing soldiers wages to be paid in quarts rather than pence. Other coins continued to circulate, however, until 1872. In that year, the Spanish currency became the sole legal tender in Gibraltar. In 1898, the Spanish–American War made the Spanish peseta drop alarmingly and on 1 October of that year, the pound was introduced as the sole currency of Gibraltar, initially in the form of British coins and banknotes.

== Tokens, 1802–20 ==
Traders' currency tokens were issued in Gibraltar between 1802 and 1820 by Robert Keeling, Richard Cattons, and James Spittles. There were two denominations – 1 quart (or quarto) and 2 quarts (or 2 quartos).

=== Robert Keeling's issues ===
KM	Year	Denomination	Obverse	Reverse
Tn 1	1802	1 quarto	View of The Rock from The Bay and 'Payable at R Keeling's Gibralter' [sic]	Castle and Key
Tn 2.1	1802	2 quartos	View of The Rock from The Bay and 'Payable at R Keeling's Gibralter' [sic]	Castle and Key
Tn 3.2	1810 [small date]	1 quarto	Lion and key and 'Payable at Robert Keeling & Sons Gibraltar'	Castle
Tn 4.2	1810 [small date]	2 quartos	Lion and key and 'Payable at Robert Keeling & Sons Gibraltar'	Castle
Tn 3.1	1810 [large date]	1 quarto	Lion and key and 'Payable at Robert Keeling & Sons Gibraltar'	Castle
Tn 4.1	1810 [large date]	2 quartos	Lion and key and 'Payable at Robert Keeling & Sons Gibraltar'	Castle

=== Richard Cattons' issues ===
KM	Year	Denomination	Obverse	Reverse
Tn 5	1813	1 quarto	Lion and key and 'Payable at Richard Cattons Goldsmith'	Crown and Wreath
Tn 6	1813	2 quartos	Lion and key and 'Payable at Richard Cattons Goldsmith'	Crown and Wreath and Agente para la fabrica de diamantes patentes de Duddell Holborn Londres (Agents for the production of patent diamonds of Duddell Holborn (London))

=== James Spittles' issues ===
KM	Year	Denomination	Obverse	Reverse
Tn 7	1818	2 quartos	Lion and key and 'Payable at James Spittles'	Moorish Castle
	1820	1 quarto	Lion and key and 'Payable at James Spittles'	Moorish Castle
Tn 9	1820	2 quartos	Lion and key and 'Payable at James Spittles'	Moorish Castle

== Coins, 1842 ==
Year	Denomination	Obverse	Reverse
1842	½, 1 and 2 quarts	Queen Victoria and 'Victoria D:G: Britanniar: Regina F:D: 1842'	Castle and Key. 'Gibraltar' above, denomination below

Note that proofs of these coins were also issued in 1860 and 1861.

== See also ==
- Gibraltar pound
