= The Sortie Made by the Garrison of Gibraltar =

1789 painting by John Trumbull

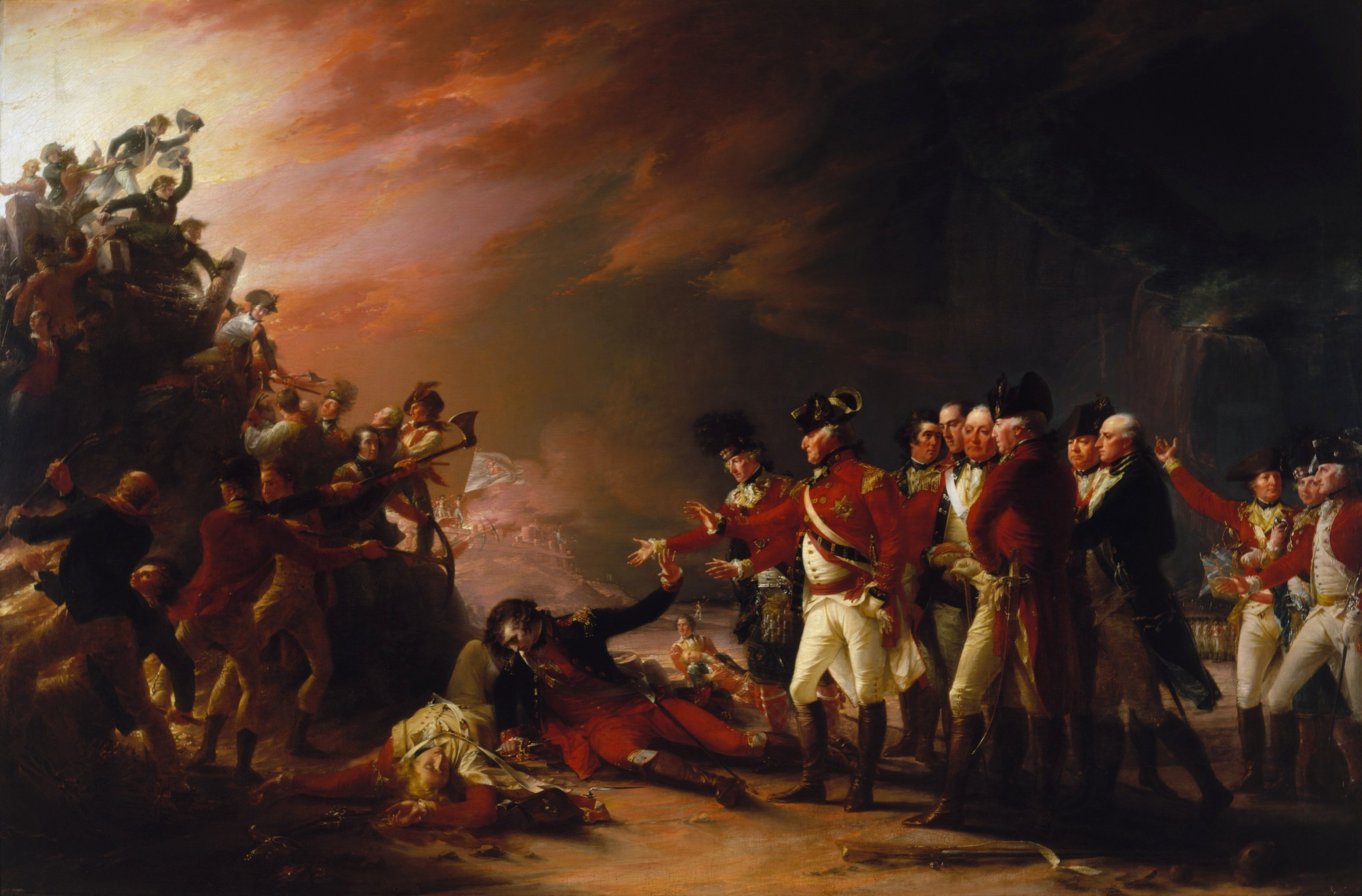
- Artist: John Trumbull
- Year: 1789
- Medium: Oil-on-canvas
- Dimensions: 180.3 cm × 271.8 cm (71 in × 107 in)
- Location: Metropolitan Museum of Art, New York City

The Sortie Made by the Garrison of Gibraltar (also called The Sortie made by the Garrison of Gibraltar in the Morning of the 27 November 1781) is a 1789 oil-on-canvas painting by American artist John Trumbull. The painting shows a key point in Gibraltar's history when the British garrison was under siege by the Spanish in November 1781. The Spanish Captain José de Barboza is being given respect as he lies dying. Although left behind by his own fleeing troops, he charged the British troops alone.

== Background ==
The painting depicts a sortie carried out by defending British forces on 27 November 1781 during the Great Siege of Gibraltar, which took place during the American War of Independence. Spain declared war on Great Britain on 16 June 1779 and began besieging Gibraltar on 24 June. In November 1781 the British defenders were informed by Spanish deserters that the besiegers were planning a massive human wave attack and on 27 November 2,534 British and Hanoverian troops, divided into three columns of between 700 and 800 men each, launched a surprise sortie against the Spanish lines. The attackers captured all forward Spanish positions and destroyed all the siege works and ammunition they found in addition to spiking all the artillery they came across. In exchange for losses of only two men killed and 25 wounded, the British inflicted over 100 casualties and destroyed 14 months of work. Despite receiving French assistance in early 1782 the Spanish were unable to capture Gibraltar and the siege ended on 7 February 1783.

== Painting ==
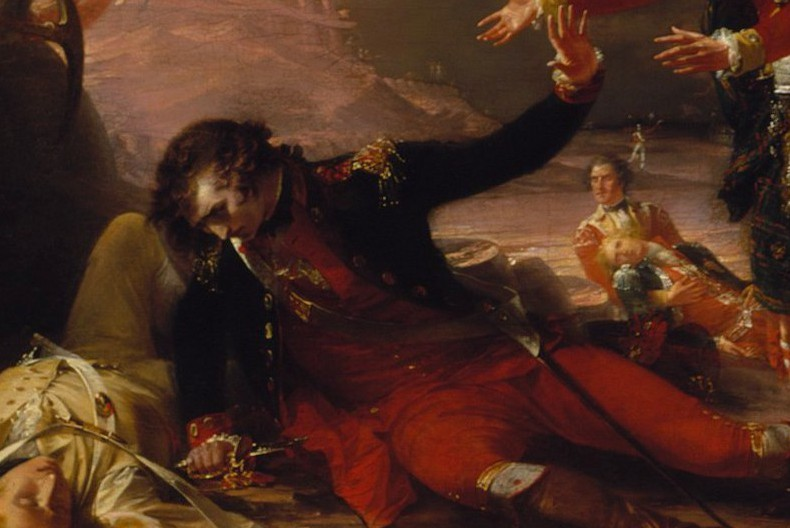
Detail from the painting depicting José de Barboza

In the 1788 version at the Cincinnati Art Museum, de Barboza shown is in a slightly different pose, looking to the right, instead of down.

The painting depicts several scenes from the sortie, including British officers standing before the forward Spanish positions, British troops destroying those positions and the Rock of Gibraltar in the background. The death of Captain José de Barboza is the focal point of the painting. An artillery officer in the Spanish Army, de Barboza was mortally wounded by Hanoverian troops during the sortie. General George Eliott came across de Barboza and offered to assist him by moving him away from nearby fires, but the Spanish officer "feebly exclaimed": "No, sir, no, leave me and let me perish amid the ruins of my post", dying a few minutes later.

In 1782 Antonio de Poggi, a London-based artist and art dealer who had earlier been in Gibraltar when it was under siege, informed Trumbull of the sortie on 27 November 1781. The engagement had all the ingredients Trumbull sought for a new painting:

...the Heroism of the vanquished, the Humanity of the Victors – the darkness of night illuminating an extensive conflagration – the Hurry and Tumult of the troops busy in the work of destruction – the quiet & calm of the Officers, the guiding Spirits of the Scene.

Trumbull had been engaged in a series of paintings of the American War of Independence which had been criticised in Britain. He saw the subject of the siege as one with which he could demonstrate that he supported British heroism as well:

...and as I knew by painting them [his American history paintings], I had given offense to some extra-patriotic people in England, I now resolved to exert my utmost talent upon the Gibraltar, to show that noble and generous actions, by whomsoever performed, were the objects to whose celebration I meant to devote myself.

Trumbull laboured on the composition, over many sketches and three large completed canvases. As the project progressed, Trumbull's ambitions for it to be his big breakthrough to major patronage grew too. He refused several offers from prominent Britons to purchase the painting for large sums of money, preferring to exhibit it privately in exchange for an admission fee. Horace Walpole called the painting "the finest picture I had ever seen painted on the northern side of the Alps." The painting was depicted on the back of the 2010 Gibraltar £10 note.

== See also ==
- The Defeat of the Floating Batteries at Gibraltar, September 1782, painting by John Singleton Copley
