= Sir Gilbert Eliott, 3rd Baronet, of Stobs =

Scottish Whig politician

Sir Gilbert Eliott
- 3rd Baronet of Stobs

Personal details
- Born: c. 1680
- Died: 27 May 1764 (aged 84)
- Spouse: Eleanor Elliot
- Children: George Augustus Eliott
- Parents: Sir William Eliott, 2nd Baronet; Margaret Murray

Sir Gilbert Eliott, 3rd Baronet, of Stobs (c. 1680 – 27 May 1764) was a Scottish Whig politician who sat in the British House of Commons between 1708 and 1727. He was outlawed after killing his opponent in an after-dinner argument and fight, but was subsequently pardoned.

== Early life ==
Eliott was the eldest son of Sir William Eliott, 2nd Baronet, a member of the pre-Union Parliament of Scotland. His mother was Sir William's second wife Margaret, daughter of Charles Murray of Hadden, Roxburghshire. He succeeded to the baronetcy on the death of his father in 1699. On 23 April 1702 at St Bride's Church, London, he married Eleanora or Eleanor Elliot (died 1728), daughter of William 'the laceman' Elliot from London, of the Elliot family of Brugh and Wells, Roxburghshire.

== Career ==
The Eliotts of Stobs dominated the politics of Roxburghshire. Three generations of Eliott's ancestors had represented the county in the Parliament of Scotland. At the 1708 British general election, Eliott was returned in a contest to serve in the new Parliament of Great Britain at Westminster as the Member of Parliament (MP) for Roxburghshire. On an election case on 16 December 1708, he upset his Scottish colleagues by sticking to the Whigs rather than joining with the Tories against a member who expressed anti-Scottish sentiments. He voted for the impeachment of Dr Sacheverell in 1710. At the 1710 British general election, he was returned as a Whig, again a contest and initially voted with the Whigs. However he began to act independently, and took part in an attempt to dissolve the Union in May 1713 and voted against the French commerce bill on in June 1713. He was returned unopposed at the 1713 British general election and voted against the expulsion of Richard Steele on 18 March 1714, He told in support of the Whigs, but was willing to work with Tories on some matters of Scottish interest.

Eliott stood down at the 1715 election in favour of William Douglas, son the county's hereditary sheriff. At the 1722 election he let the seat be taken by his relative Sir Gilbert Elliot, 2nd Baronet, of Minto. Minto was appointed in 1726 as a judge of the Court of Session, and at the resulting by-election Sir Gilbert was elected to replace him.

However, at a dinner shortly after the election, he fell into an argument with Colonel John Stewart (a former MP for Kirkcudbright Stewartry). The dispute escalated into a fight, and Sir Gilbert killed the Colonel with his sword. He was declared an outlaw, and fled to Holland. Due to lobbying on his behalf during the next year by his friends Lord Minto and Lord Ilay, Eliott received a royal pardon, and returned to Scotland.

== Death and legacy ==
Eliott lived quietly at family seat was at Stobs Castle near Hawick, Roxburghshire, until his death in 1764, aged about 84. He and his wife had 10 sons and one daughter, including

- George Augustus Eliott, Lord Heathfield, (1717-1790)

He was succeeded in the baronetcy by his son John.

Parliament of Great Britain
New constituency	Member of Parliament for Roxburghshire; 1708–1715	Succeeded by William Douglas
Preceded by William Douglas	Member of Parliament for Roxburghshire; 1726–1727	Succeeded by William Douglas
Baronetage of Nova Scotia
Preceded by William Eliott	Baronet (of Stobs); 1699–1764	Succeeded by John Eliott
