= The Defeat of the Floating Batteries at Gibraltar, September 1782 =

Painting by John Singleton Copley

The Defeat of the Floating Batteries at Gibraltar
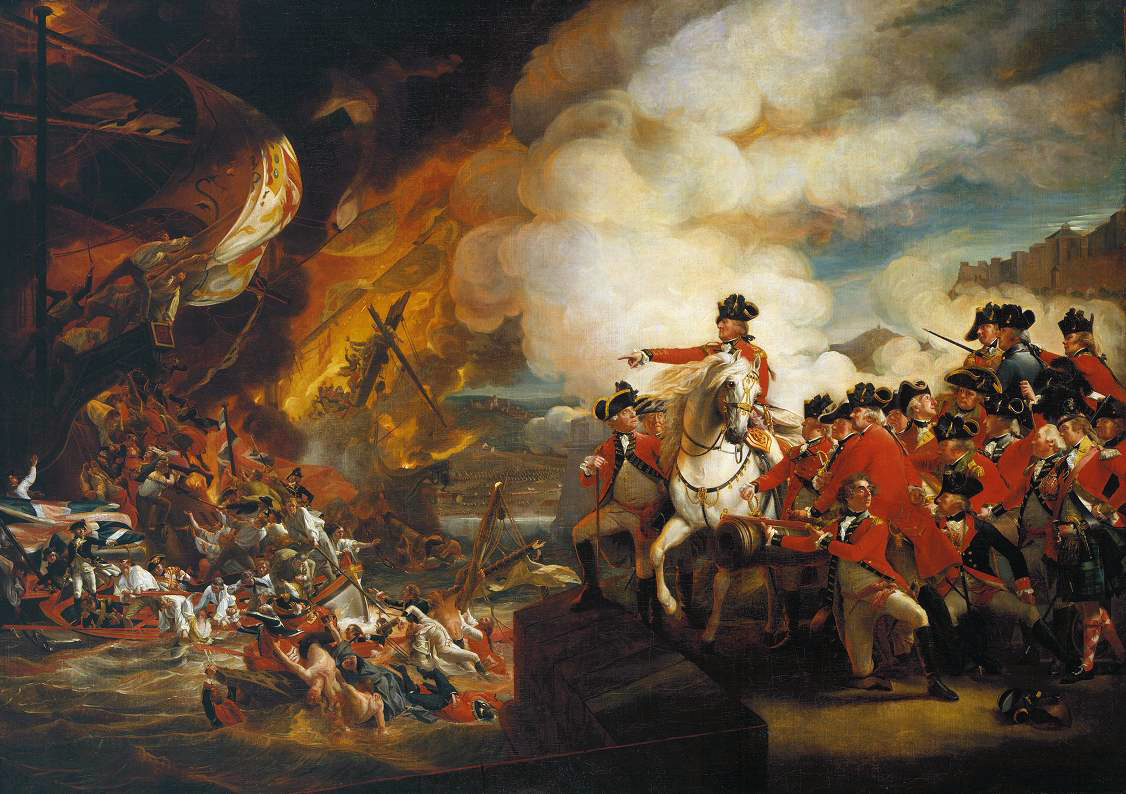
- Artist: John Singleton Copley
- Year: 1783–1791
- Type: Oil-on-canvas
- Dimensions: 544 cm × 754 cm (214 in × 297 in)
- Location: Guildhall Art Gallery, London

The Defeat of the Floating Batteries at Gibraltar (also called The Siege of Gibraltar, The Siege and Relief of Gibraltar or The Repulse of the Floating Batteries at Gibraltar) is the title of a 1791 oil-on-canvas painting by Boston-born American artist John Singleton Copley. It depicts a coastal view of the naval action of the Great Siege of Gibraltar, part of the European theatre of the American Revolutionary War. The Spanish floating batteries lie crippled and aflame in the background, while the shoreward waters are choked with Spanish casualties. The British rescue efforts are commanded from horseback by the Governor of Gibraltar, General George Augustus Eliott.

== Background ==
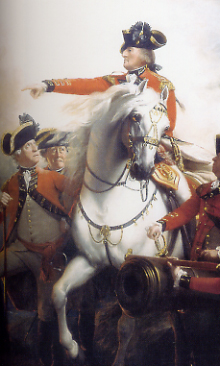
George Augustus Eliott, 1st Baron Heathfield in the painting

The painting is based on an attack that took place in Gibraltar on 13 September 1782. The Great Siege of Gibraltar was an unsuccessful attempt by Spain and France to capture Gibraltar from the British during the War of American Independence. In September 1782 the Spanish formulated a secret weapon known as the Floating Batteries. Designed to fire on Gibraltar at close quarters with deadly accuracy, floating batteries were built of 1 metre (3 ft)-wide timbers packed with layers of wet sand, and were considered fire-proof and unsinkable. The British used heated shot to counterattack these batteries. These "hot potatoes," as they were nicknamed, were pre-heated to furnace temperatures before being fired at the advancing ships. Many were doused but a rogue heated shot could lie smouldering in the bowels of an enemy ship burning a cavity into the wood. Left long enough, these would eventually cause an inferno.

== Painting ==
American-born John Singleton Copley was commissioned by the City of London in 1783 to depict the victory of the Great Siege which had been won a few months earlier. At over 42.5 square metres (458 square feet), his picture is one of Britain's largest oil paintings.

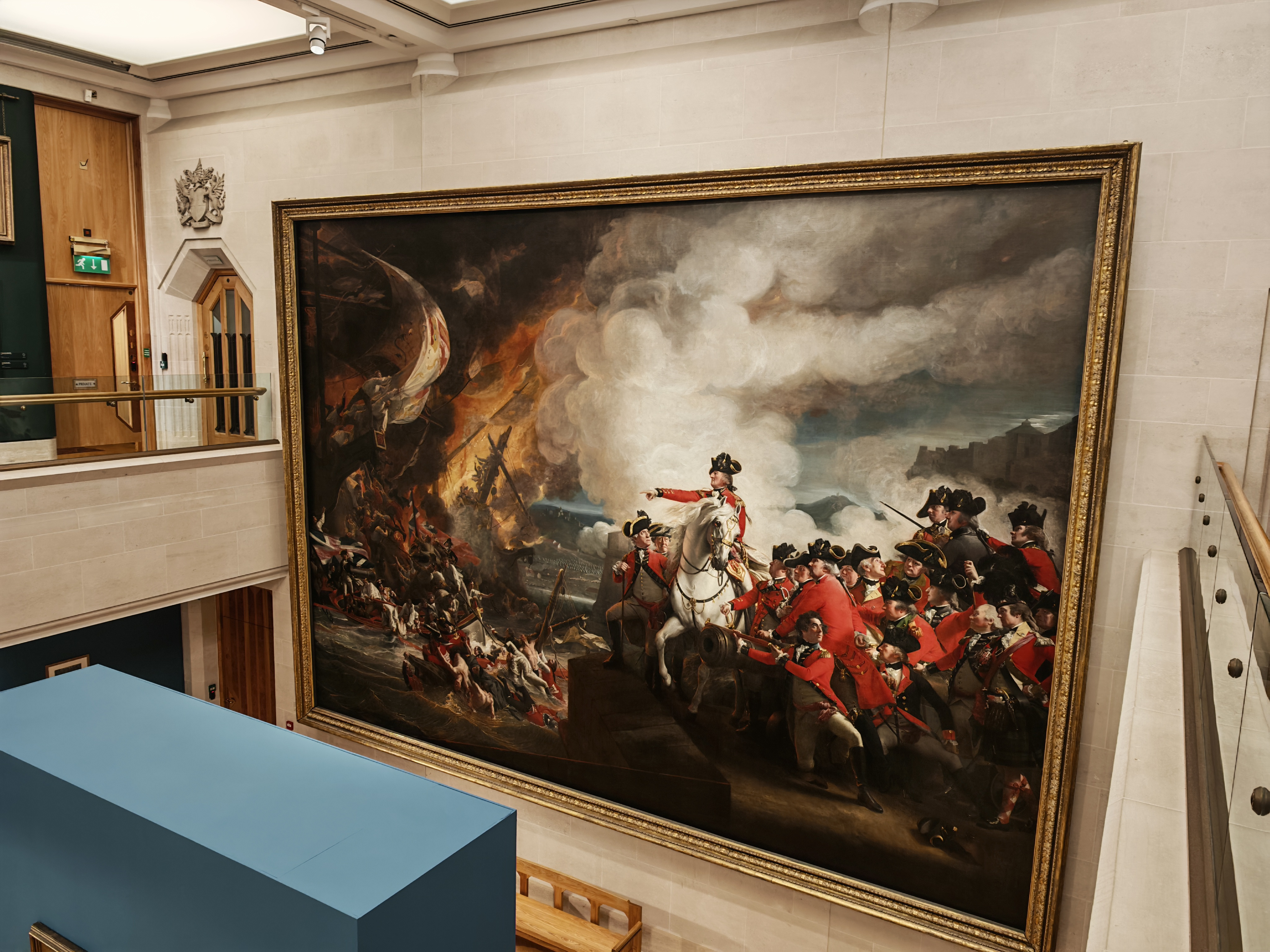
John Singleton Copley's "The Defeat of the Floating Batteries at Gibraltar, September 1782" in situ at The Guildhall art gallery, City of London 31st July 2025

It depicts the Governor General George Augustus Eliott, riding to the edge of the battlements to direct the rescue of the defeated Spanish sailors by the British. General Eliott, created Lord Heathfield in 1787, was also portrayed by Sir Joshua Reynolds (link), currently in the National Gallery, London and Copley himself (link), currently in the National Portrait Gallery; both pictures were painted in 1787. Two of Copley's preparatory sketches for the painting are in the Metropolitan Museum of Art; three are at the Harvard Art Museums.

Several years after Copley began work on his canvas, fellow American painter John Trumbull began work on a painting of a different scene of the Great Siege, The Sortie Made by the Garrison of Gibraltar. Trumbull finished his canvas in 1789 and displayed it in 1790, when Copley was able to view it and take some compositional inspirations, specifically in the lower left corner of his work.

The painting was originally hung in the Common Council Chamber at Guildhall before being transferred to the original Guildhall Art Gallery in 1886. It was later taken down and taken out of London to be stored in safety during The Blitz in April 1941, three weeks before the Gallery was destroyed. No wall large enough to display it could be found until the Gallery was finally rebuilt. The painting was then loaned to the Governor's residence in Gibraltar, but since 1993 loaned for exhibition/gallery display at the Gibraltar Museum.

It is now on display at the Guildhall Art gallery in London, where it occupies the entire back wall of the main exhibition space.

== See also ==
- The Sortie Made by the Garrison of Gibraltar
