= Gibraltar pound =

Currency of Gibraltar

ISO 4217
- Code: GIP (numeric: 292)
- Subunit: 0.01

Units of account
- Plural: Pounds
- Symbol: £
- Subunit
- 1/100: Penny
- Plural
- Penny: Pence
- Symbol
- Penny: p

Denominations
- Banknotes
- Freq. used: £5, £10, £20, £50
- Rarely used: £100
- Coins: 1p, 2p, 5p, 10p, 20p, 50p, £1, £2, £5

Demographics
- Official user(s): Gibraltar (alongside sterling)
- Unofficial users: La Línea, Spain (local businesses)

Issuance
- Currency board: Commissioner of Currency of Gibraltar
- Website: www.gibraltar.gov.gi

Valuation
- Inflation: 2.0% (2013 est.)
- Pegged with: sterling at par

The pound (sign: £; ISO code: GIP) is the currency of Gibraltar. It is pegged to – and exchangeable with – British pound sterling at par value. Coins and banknotes of the Gibraltar pound are issued by the Government of Gibraltar.

== History ==
Until 1872, the currency situation in Gibraltar was complicated, with a system based on the real being employed which encompassed British, Spanish and Gibraltarian coins. From 1825, the real (actually the Spanish real de plata) was tied to the pound at the rate of 1 Spanish dollar to 4 shillings 4 pence (equivalent to 21.67 pence today). In 1872, however, the Spanish currency became the sole legal tender in Gibraltar. In 1898, the Spanish–American War made the Spanish peseta drop alarmingly and the pound was introduced as the sole currency of Gibraltar, initially in the form of British coins and banknotes.

In 1898, sterling coin was made sole legal tender, although the Spanish peseta continued in circulation until the Spanish Civil War. Since 1927, Gibraltar has issued its own banknotes and, since 1988, its own coins. Gibraltar decimalised in 1971 at the same time as the UK, replacing the system of 1 pound = 20 shillings = 240 pence with one of 1 pound = 100 (new) pence.

== Relationship with the British pound ==
The since repealed Currency Notes Act 1934, conferred on the Government of Gibraltar the right to print its own notes.

Notes issued are either backed by Bank of England notes at a rate of one to one, or can be backed by securities issued by the Government of Gibraltar. Although Gibraltar notes are denominated in "pounds sterling", they are not legal tender anywhere in the United Kingdom. Gibraltar's coins are the same weight, size and metal as British coins, although the designs are different, and they are occasionally found in circulation across Britain.

Under the Currency Notes Act 2011 the notes and coins issued by the Government of Gibraltar are legal tender and current coin within Gibraltar. British coins and Bank of England notes also circulate in Gibraltar and are universally accepted and interchangeable with Gibraltarian issues.

== Coins ==
1 pound, 1999 issue

Obverse

Reverse

In 1988, coins in denominations of 1, 2, 5, 10, 20 and 50 pence and 1 pound were introduced which bore specific designs for and the name of Gibraltar. They were the same sizes and compositions as the corresponding British coins, with 2-pound coins introduced in 1999. A new coin of 5 pounds was issued in 2010 with the inscription "Elizabeth II · Queen of Gibraltar". This issue caused controversy in Spain, where the title of King of Gibraltar historically corresponds to the Crown of Castile. In 2025 the Gibraltar National Mint issued the first 12-sided £1 coin, with the effigy of King Charles III and the inscription “Charles III, King of Gibraltar”, which reportedly saw high demand among collectors.

Depiction of Gibraltar coinage | Reverse side
£0.01	£0.02	£0.05
Barbary partridge	Europa Point Lighthouse	Barbary macaque and Gibraltar candytuft
£0.10	£0.20	£0.50
Europort	Our Lady of Europe	Bottlenose dolphins
£1.00	£2.00	
Fortress and Key	Pillars of Hercules	

The £2 coin has featured a new design every year since its introduction, as it depicts each of the 12 Labours of Hercules.

=== Tercentenary edition ===
In 2004 the Government of Gibraltar minted a new edition of its coins to commemorate the tercentenary of British Gibraltar (1704–2004).

£0.01	£0.02	£0.05
Barbary macaque	Keys of Gibraltar	Constitution Order (1969)
£0.10	£0.20	£0.50
Operation Torch (1942)	Discovery of Neanderthal skull in Gibraltar (1848)	Battle of Trafalgar (1805)
£1.00	£2.00	
Great Siege of Gibraltar (1779–1783)	Capture of Gibraltar (1704)	

=== 2005 series ===
In 2005, the Government of Gibraltar issued a new series of coins featuring the designs of the Tercentenary issues, being placed on different denominations. A £5 coin was issued for this series, depicting the Rock of Gibraltar.

Third series of Gibraltar coinage | Reverse side
£0.01	£0.02	£0.05
Constitution Order (1969)	Operation Torch (1942)	Barbary ape
£0.10	£0.20	£0.50
The Great Siege (1779–1783)	The Keys of Gibraltar	Our Lady of Europe
£1.00	£2.00	£5.00
Discovery of the Neanderthal Skull in Gibraltar (1848)	Battle of Trafalgar (1805)	Rock of Gibraltar

Fourth series of Gibraltar coinage | Reverse side
£0.01	£0.02	£0.05
Coat of arms of Gibraltar with inscription "Fiftieth Anniversary of the Referendum"	Coat of arms of Gibraltar with inscription "Fiftieth Anniversary of the Referendum"	Coat of arms of Gibraltar with inscription "Fiftieth Anniversary of the Referendum"
£0.10	£0.20	£0.50
Coat of arms of Gibraltar with inscription "Fiftieth Anniversary of the Referendum" (1779–1783)	Coat of arms of Gibraltar with inscription "Fiftieth Anniversary of the Referendum"	Coat of arms of Gibraltar with inscription "Fiftieth Anniversary of the Referendum"
£1.00		
Coat of arms of Gibraltar with inscription "Fiftieth Anniversary of the Referendum" (1848)		

Seventh series of Gibraltar coinage | Reverse side
£0.01	£0.02	£0.05
Commonwealth Park	Small Boats Marina	Windsor Bridge
£0.10	£0.20	£0.50
Barbary Patridge	Dolphins	Skywalk
£1.00	£2.00	
Moorish Castle	Sandy Bay	

== Banknotes ==
At the outbreak of the First World War, Gibraltar was forced to issue banknotes to prevent paying out sterling or gold. These notes were issued under emergency wartime legislation, Ordinance 10 of 1914. At first, the typeset notes were signed by hand by Treasurer Greenwood, though he later used stamps. The notes bore the embossed stamp of the Anglo-Egyptian Bank Ltd. and circulated alongside British Territory notes. The 1914 notes were issued in denominations of 2/-, 10/-, £1, £5 and £50. The 2/- and £50 notes were not continued when a new series of notes was introduced in 1927. The 10/- note was replaced by the 50p coin during the process of decimalisation. In 1975, £10 and £20 notes were introduced, followed by £50 in 1986. The £1 note was discontinued in 1988. In 1995, a new series of notes was introduced which, for the first time, bore the words "pounds sterling" rather than just "pounds". The government of Gibraltar introduced a new series of banknotes beginning with the £10 and £50 notes issued on 8 July 2010. On 11 May 2011, the £5, £20 and £100 notes were issued. In 2021, the government of Gibraltar introduced a new series of banknotes in a reduced size, closely matching that of the banknotes of the Bank of England. The first note, the £5 was issued into circulation in 2021.

Circulating banknotes (2010–2011 Issue)
Image		Denomination	Dimensions	Dominant colour	Description	
Obverse	Reverse	Denomination	Dimensions	Dominant colour	Obverse	Reverse
		£5	133 × 70 mm (5.2 × 2.8 in)	Green	Queen Elizabeth II, Coat of Arms of Castle with Key	Upper Ward and Tower of Homage of the Moorish castle
		£10	141 × 75 mm (5.6 × 3.0 in)	Blue	Queen Elizabeth II, Coat of Arms of Castle with Key	Artist John Trumbull’s "The Sortie Made by the Garrison of Gibraltar" depicting Spanish and English troops fighting and General George Eliott with officers attending to the dying Don José de Barboza during the Great Siege of Gibraltar, 1779–83;
		£20	150 × 80 mm (5.9 × 3.1 in)	Orange	Queen Elizabeth II, Coat of Arms of Castle with Key	HMS Victory returning to Gibraltar being towed by HMS Neptune after the Battle of Trafalgar
		£50	157 × 85 mm (6.2 × 3.3 in)	Red	Queen Elizabeth II, Coat of Arms of Castle with Key	Casemates Square buildings
		£100	164 × 90 mm (6.5 × 3.5 in)	Purple	Queen Elizabeth II, Coat of Arms of Castle with Key	King's Bastion

Circulating banknotes (2021 Issue)
Image		Denomination	Dimensions	Dominant colour	Description	
Obverse	Reverse	Denomination	Dimensions	Dominant colour	Obverse	Reverse
		£5	125 × 65 mm (4.9 × 2.6 in)	Green	Queen Elizabeth II, Coat of Arms of Castle with Key	Windsor Bridge

Current GIP exchange rates
From Google Finance:	AUD CAD CHF CNY EUR GBP HKD JPY USD GBP JPY USD
From Yahoo! Finance:	AUD CAD CHF CNY EUR GBP HKD JPY USD GBP JPY USD
From XE.com:	AUD CAD CHF CNY EUR GBP HKD JPY USD GBP JPY USD
From OANDA:	AUD CAD CHF CNY EUR GBP HKD JPY USD GBP JPY USD

== See also ==
- Economy of Gibraltar
- Currency board
- Christopher Ironside, OBE, coin designer: reverse design of the 25 New Pence coin, Barbary ape (issued 1971).

== Bibliography ==
- Krause, Chester L.; Clifford Mishler (1991). Standard Catalog of World Coins: 1801–1991 (18th ed.). Krause Publications. ISBN 0873411501.
- Pick, Albert (1994). Bruce, Colin R. II; Shafer, Neil (eds.). Standard Catalog of World Paper Money: General Issues (7th ed.). Krause Publications. ISBN 0-87341-207-9.
