= Francis Augustus Eliott, 2nd Baron Heathfield =

General The Right Honourable The Lord Heathfield
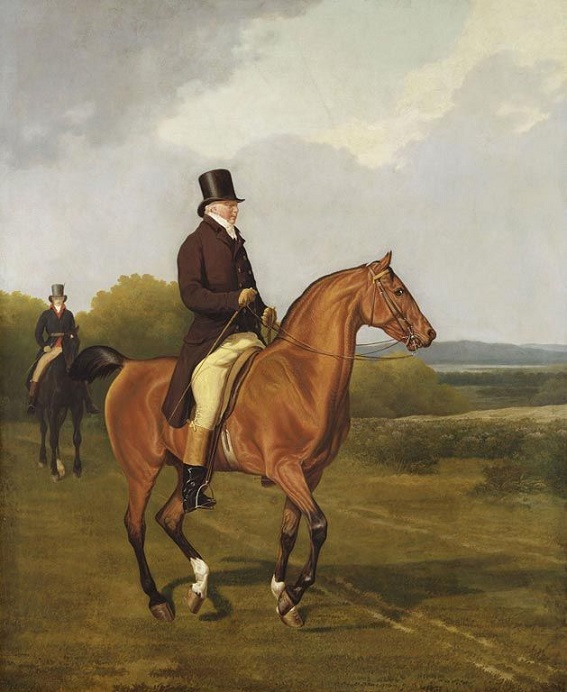
- Born: 31 December 1750
- Died: 26 January 1813 (aged 62)
- Military career
- Allegiance: United Kingdom
- Branch: British Army
- Rank: General

General Francis Augustus Eliott, 2nd Baron Heathfield (31 December 1750 – 26 January 1813) was a senior British Army officer.

== Military career ==
Heathfield was a soldier who served as lieutenant-colonel of the 6th (Inniskilling) Dragoons. He largely demolished Nutwell, the family home, and built in its place a neo-classical house faced with tiles imitating Portland stone, an undertaking which he completed c.1800.

He was colonel of the 1st King's Dragoon Guards from 1810 until his death in 1813 and served as a lord of the bedchamber under George IV from 1812 until his death. He did not marry, had no children and the barony became extinct when he died. Heathfield's library was sold at auction by Leigh & Sotheby in London on 17 March 1814 (and five following days).

== Sources ==
- Gray, Todd & Rowe, Margery (Eds.), Travels in Georgian Devon: The Illustrated Journals of The Reverend John Swete, 1789–1800, 4 vols., Tiverton, 1999

Military offices
Preceded by Sir William Pitt	Colonel of the 1st (The King's) Dragoon Guards; 1810–1813	Succeeded by Sir David Dundas
Peerage of Great Britain
Preceded by George Augustus Eliott	Baron Heathfield; 1790–1813	Extinct
