= George Augustus Eliott, 1st Baron Heathfield =

British Army officer (1717–1790)

General The Right Honourable The Lord Heathfield KB PC
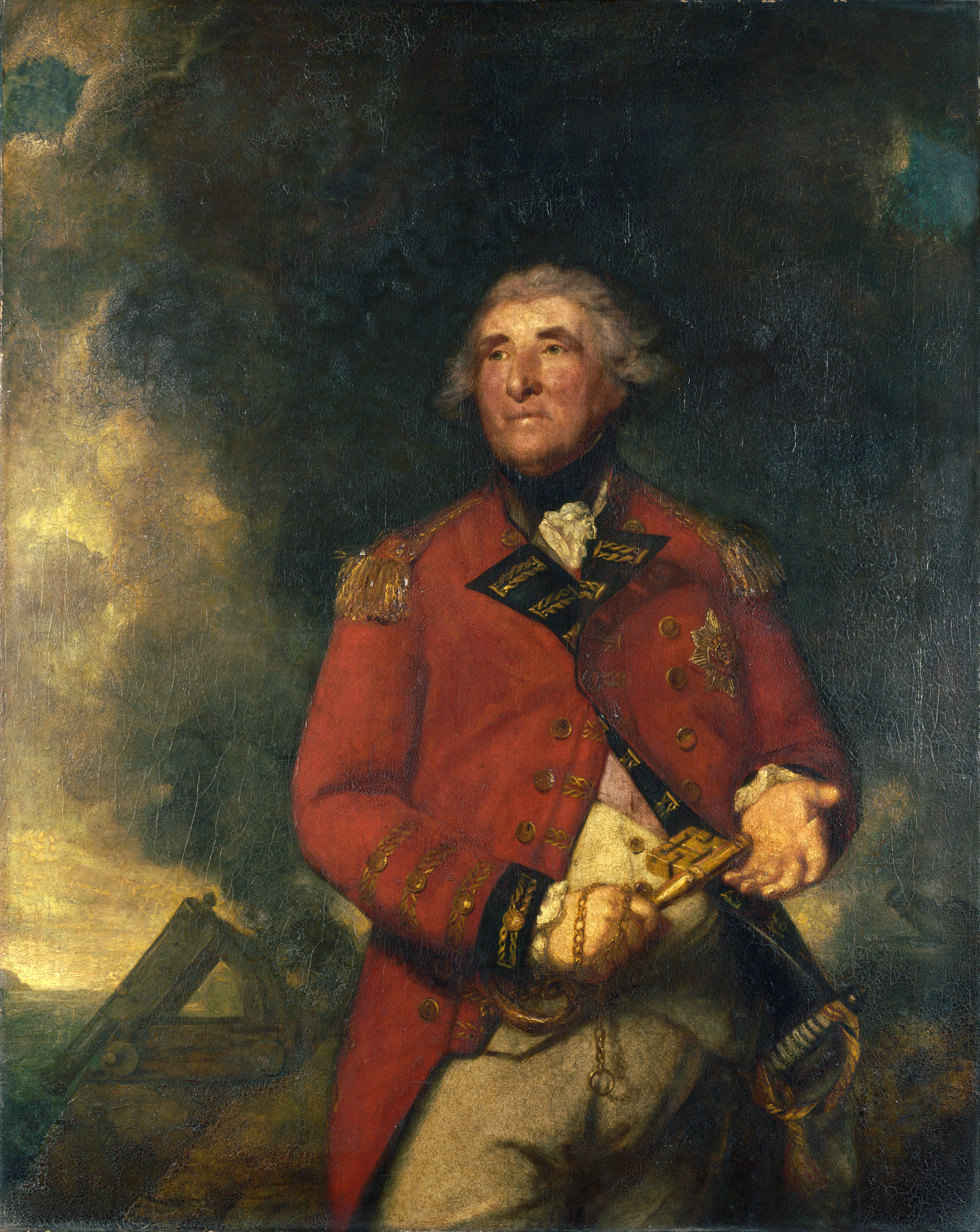
- Portrait of Lord Heathfield by Sir Joshua Reynolds, 1787

Governor of Londonderry
- In office 1774–1775

Governor of Gibraltar
- In office 1777–1790

Personal details
- Born: 25 December 1717 Wells House, near Stobs, Roxburghshire, Scotland
- Died: 6 July 1790 (aged 72) Schloss Kalkofen, Aachen, Germany
- Resting place: St Andrew's Church, Buckland Monachorum, Devon
- Awards: Privy Council of Great Britain; Knight Companion of the Order of the Bath

Military service
- Allegiance: Great Britain
- Branch/service: British Army
- Years of service: 1741–1790
- Battles/wars: War of the Austrian Succession; Battle of Dettingen; Battle of Fontenoy; Seven Years' War; Battle of Minden; Battle of Emsdorf; Capture of Belle Île; Siege of Havana; American War of Independence; Great Siege of Gibraltar

General George Augustus Eliott, 1st Baron Heathfield, KB, PC (25 December 1717 – 6 July 1790) was a British Army officer who served as the governor of Gibraltar from 1779 to 1790. Eliott rose to distinction during the Seven Years' War when he fought in Germany and participated in the capture of Belle Île and siege of Havana. He is most notable for his command of the Gibraltar garrison during the Great Siege of Gibraltar, which lasted from 1779 to 1783, during the American War of Independence. He was celebrated for his successful defence of the fortress and decisive defeat of Spanish and French attackers.

== Life ==
=== Early life ===
Eliott was born at Wells House, near Stobs Castle, Roxburghshire, the 10th (and 8th surviving) son of Sir Gilbert Eliott, 3rd Baronet, of Stobs, by his distant cousin Eleanor Elliot of Brugh and Wells in Roxburghshire. Eleanor's brother was the soldier and courtier William Elliot of Wells. One of his Eleanor's sisters, Charlotte, had married Roger Elliott, another Governor of Gibraltar.

=== Education and early command ===
Eliott was educated at the University of Leiden in the Dutch Republic and studied artillery and other military subjects at the école militaire of La Fère in France. He served with the Prussian Army between 1735 and 1736.

In 1741 he transferred to the Engineers and joined the 2nd Troop of Horse Grenadier Guards, of which his maternal uncle, William Elliot of Wells, was then lieutenant-colonel, and of which Eliott was afterwards lieutenant-colonel. He served throughout the War of Austrian Succession between 1742 and 1748, fighting at the Battle of Dettingen, where he was wounded, and again at the Battle of Fontenoy. He became an Engineer Extraordinary in 1744 and Engineer Ordinary in 1747 when he was stationed at Sheerness. Eliott resigned from the Engineers in 1757.

=== Seven Years' War ===
Eliott served as ADC to King George II between 1756 and 1759 during which time he was raised to colonel. Appointed Brigadier for the 1758 expedition to France, where he was placed in command of the Brigade of Light Cavalry, he was tasked to raise, and was appointed colonel of, the 1st Light Horse (later 15th Light Dragoons, then 15th Hussars). Eliott distinguished himself in the German campaign, particularly during the Battle of Minden in 1759 when he was promoted to major-general and the 1760 Battle of Emsdorf.

He took part in the Capture of Belle Île in 1761. He was 2nd-in-charge at the capture of Havana during the 1762 British expedition against Cuba for which he received a significant amount of prize money, nearly £25,000. Eliot was able to buy Bayley Park in East Sussex which he altered and enlarged over the decade. He was promoted lieutenant-general in 1765. On 6 March 1775 he was made a Privy Counsellor and temporarily appointed commander of forces in Ireland.

=== Gibraltar and the Great Siege ===
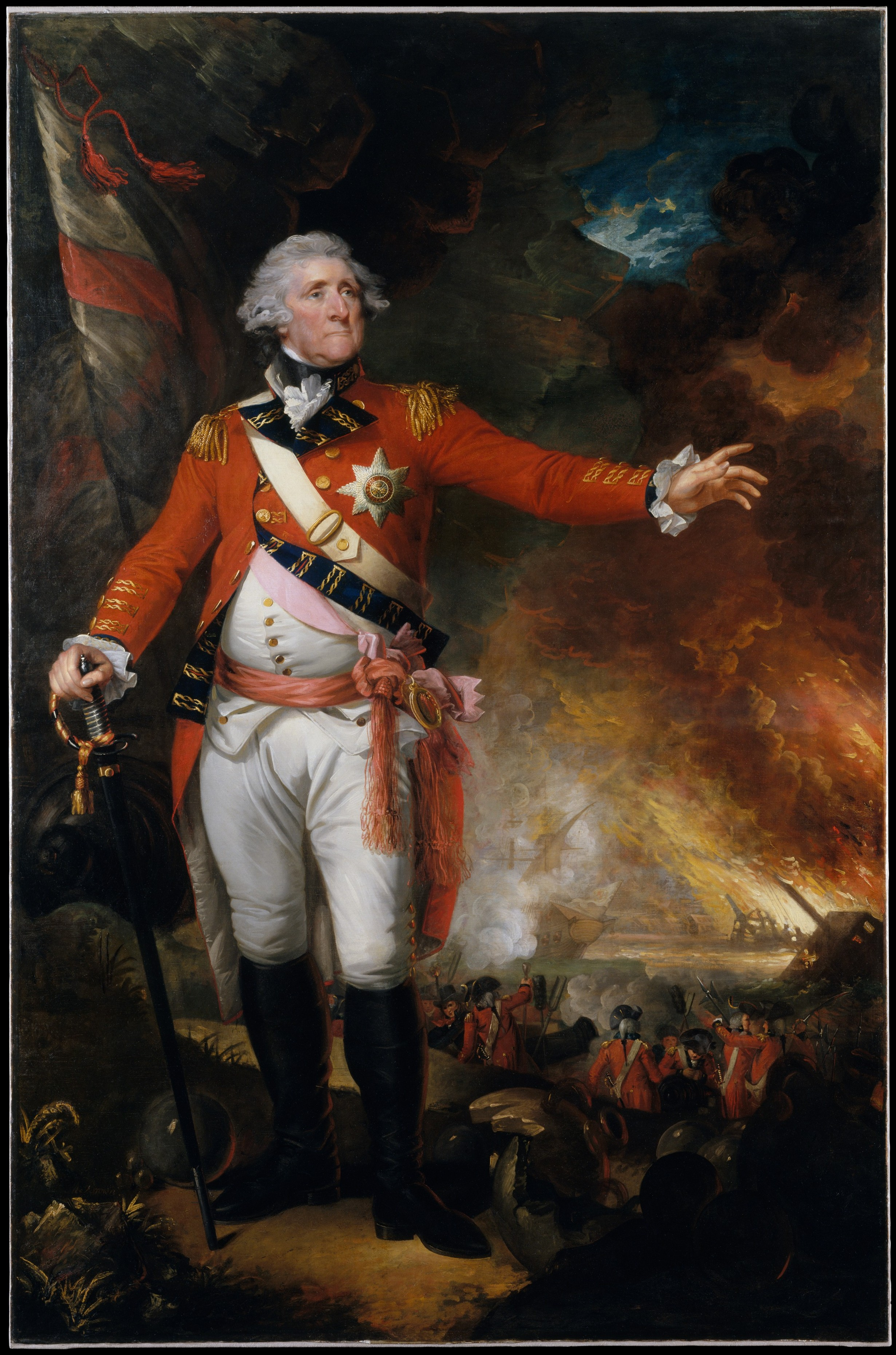
George Augustus Eliott Portrait by Mather Brown Portrait on display at the Metropolitan Museum of Art

On 25 May 1777 Eliott was appointed Governor of Gibraltar, taking over from the acting governor, Robert Boyd. Eliott was promoted to general in 1778.

In July 1779, Gibraltar was besieged by the French and Spanish. Eliott using his engineering skills to good effect in improving the fortifications. By August, it was very apparent that the Spanish intended to starve the garrison. The Great Siege of Gibraltar would eventually last from 1779 to 1783. A notable letter from Eliott to the Misses Fuller survives, dated 21 September 1779 and delivered on 4 October, it said simply "Nothing new. G.A.E." Eliott was an abstemious man, his diet comprising vegetables, biscuit and water. He also rarely slept for more than four hours at a time.

On 13 September 1782, the French and Spanish initiated a grand attack, involving 100,000 men, 48 ships and 450 cannon. Under great duress, the garrison held its position and, by 1783, the siege was finishing. On 8 January 1783, the British Parliament sent their official thanks to Eliott and he was nominated a Knight of the Bath. By 6 February 1783, the siege was over. Eliott was invested with his honour at Gibraltar on 23 April.

A portrait from 1784, "The Siege of Gibraltar" (1782) by George Carter survives in the National Portrait Gallery.

=== Later career ===
Eliott returned to England in 1787. He was created Lord Heathfield, Baron Heathfield of Gibraltar on 6 July 1787 and in addition many statues, portraits and coins were produced in his honour.

A will exists dated 27 February 1788. On 19 May 1788 Eliott was formally installed as Knight of the Bath, and, in June 1788, a portrait "The Installation Supper" was painted by James Gillray and resides in the National Portrait Gallery.

About this time, Eliott was making his way overland back to Gibraltar, where he was still governor. However, he became ill and stayed in the Aachen area to recuperate. During 1790, he stayed at Grossen Hotel, Dubigk; Karlsbad (bei Herr Brammertz); Kaiserbad, Aachen (bei Herr Mohren). In June 1790 he rented the Schloss Kalkofen, Aachen (nowadays Talbotstrasse, Aachen, Germany), and moved in his furniture but did not live long to enjoy the facilities.

== Personal life, family and death ==
Arms of Eliott: Gules, on a bend or a batton bendwise azure. As seen on his memorial by John Bacon, senior

Eliott was a teetotaller and vegetarian. It was recorded that he "never touched strong liquor or meat, but lived chiefly on vegetables, simple puddings, and water". He did not sleep for more than four hours at a time.

On 8 September 1748 at St Sepulchre-without-Newgate, London, George Augustus Eliott married Anne Pollexfen Drake (1726–1772), the sister of Sir Francis Drake, 5th Baronet (1723–1794) of Nutwell House, Woodbury in Devon, a collateral descendant of Sir Francis Drake. They had two children:

1. Francis Augustus Eliott, 2nd Baron Heathfield (31 December 1750 – 26 January 1813), who never married, had no offspring and was therefore the last Baron Heathfield. He inherited Nutwell from his uncle Sir Francis Drake, 5th Baronet (1723–1794);
2. Anne Pollexfen Eliott (1754-24 February 1835), who married John Trayton Fuller on 21 May 1777 with numerous children.

On 6 July 1790, Eliott died at the Schloss Kalkofen, Aachen, of palsy / stroke, allegedly brought on by drinking too much of the local mineral water, and was initially buried in the grounds of the Schloss. His personal estate was probated by 27 July and his furniture sold off by his heirs. Later in 1790, his body was disinterred and reburied at Heathfield, East Sussex. Later still, his body was again disinterred and reburied at St Andrew's Church, Buckland Monachorum, Devon in the church associated with his wife's Drake ancestry.

== Legacy and monuments ==
General Eliott has been commemorated on a Gibraltar pound banknote; his portrait has appeared since 1995 on the £10 notes issued by the Government of Gibraltar.

In August and September 1787, George's portrait was painted by Sir Joshua Reynolds and now resides in the National Gallery. A painting entitled The Defeat of the Floating Batteries at Gibraltar, September 1782 by John Singleton Copley survive from 1787 in the Guildhall Art Gallery, and another Copley painting this time a head portrait is (link), currently in the National Portrait Gallery. Another American artist John Trumbull created the well known portrait The Sortie Made by the Garrison of Gibraltar which resides in the Metropolitan Museum of Art. His portrait was also painted by Mather Brown in 1788.

His marble monument and statue exist in the south transept of St Paul's Cathedral, London. A bust of Elliot created in 1858 stands in the Gibraltar Botanic Gardens. A bronze medal "George Augustus Eliott, 1st Baron Heathfield" was created by Jean-Pierre Droz.

There are various pubs throughout England that honour his name; including the General Eliott in Willoughby Waterleys, Leicestershire, on the Grand Union Canal at Uxbridge, and another in the village of South Hinksey, Oxfordshire.

He is mentioned in Robert Burns's cantata The Jolly Beggars as an inspiring figure. The old soldier singing the air "I Am a Son of Mars" says: "Yet let my country need me, with Elliot [sic] to head me, / I'd clatter on my stumps at the sound of a drum."

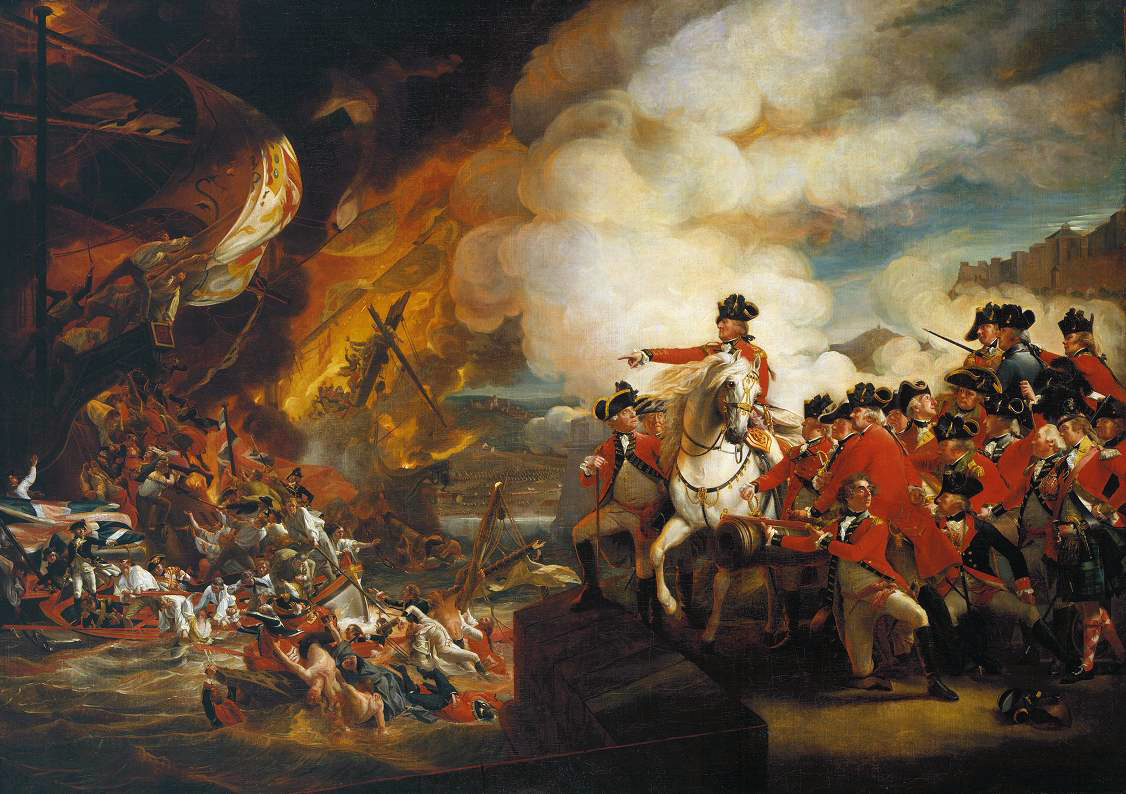
Defeat of the floating batteries by John Singleton Copley - climax of the Great Siege of Gibraltar in 1782. Eliot is on the white horse

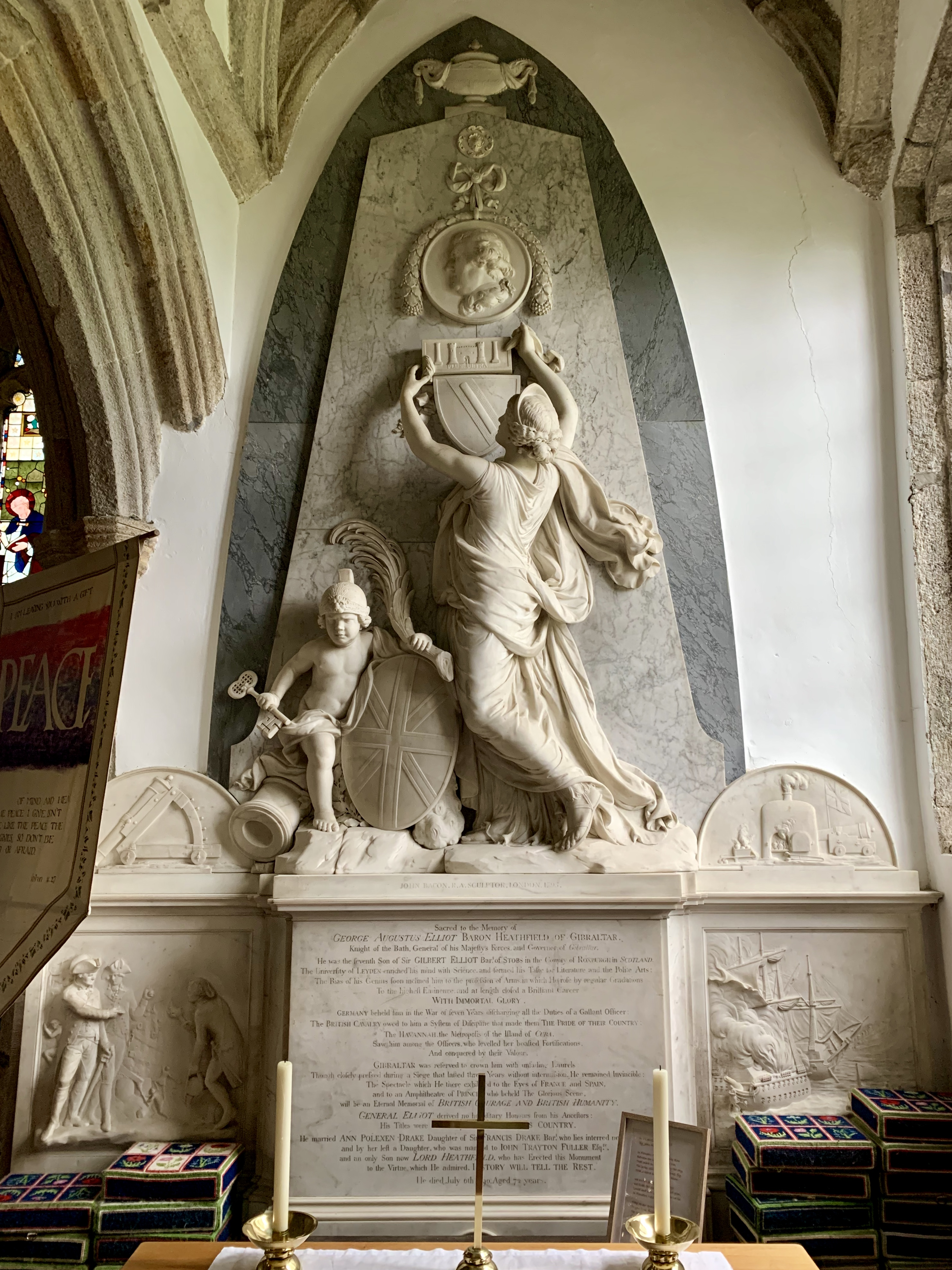
Memorial by John Bacon, senior in St Andrew's Church, Buckland Monachorum

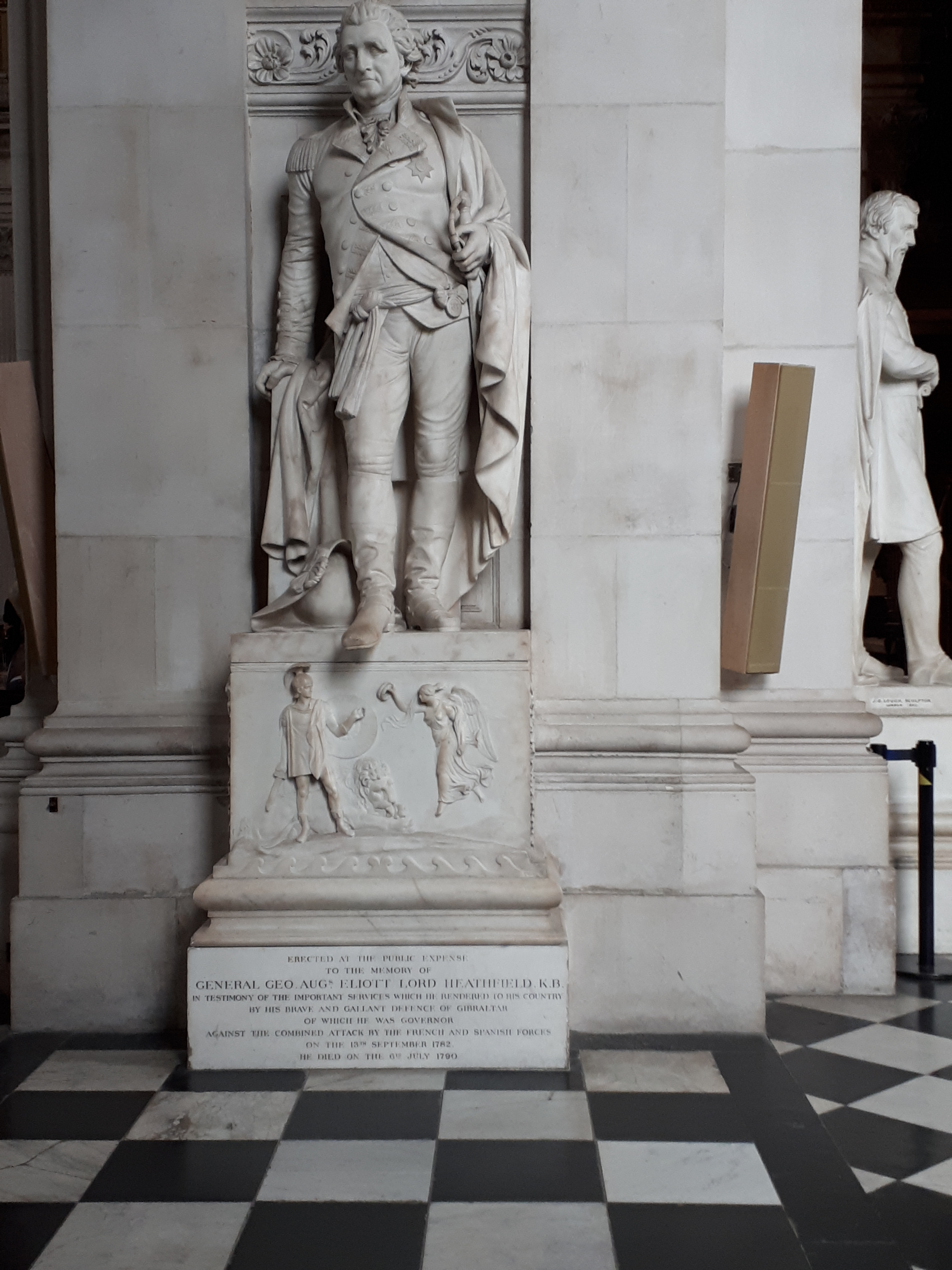
Memorial to Elliot, by Charles Rossi in St. Paul's Cathedral, London

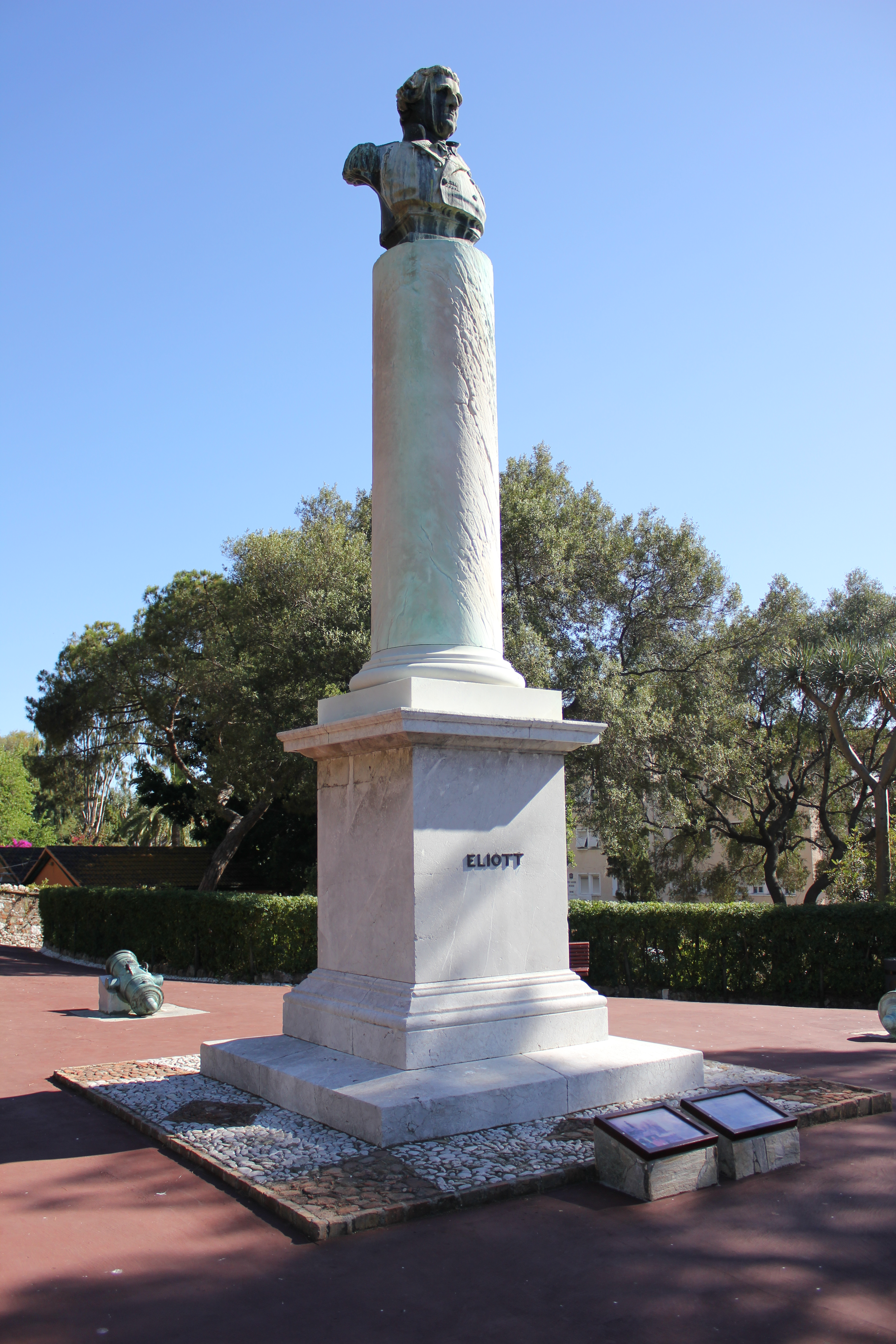
Bust of Eliott in the Gibraltar Botanic Gardens

== Arms ==
Coat of arms of George Augustus Eliott, 1st Baron Heathfield
Crest A dexter arm holding a cutlass proper, the arm charged with a key Escutcheon Gules, on a bend Or a baton Azure; Augmentation: On a chief of the last the fortress of Gibraltar winged with turrets between two pillars Argent masoned Sable, the gate of the castle of the last charged with a key of the second and below the same the words "PLUS ULTRA" (Latin for 'more beyond') Supporters Dexter a ram; sinister a goat each wreathed with flowers round the neck Motto FORTITER ET RECTE (Latin for 'Boldly and rightly') Orders Order of the Bath: TRIA JUNCTA IN UNO (Latin for 'three joined in one')

== See also ==
- Governors of Gibraltar
- Drake baronets
- George Augustus Eliot (1784–1835), British and Canadian Army officer

== Bibliography ==
- McGuffie, T.H. The Siege of Gibraltar 1779–1783. B.T. Batsford, 1965.

Military offices
New regiment	Colonel of 15th (The King's); Regiment of (Light) Dragoons; 1759–1790	Succeeded by Guy Carleton
Preceded by William Keppel	Commander-in-Chief, Ireland; 1774–1775	Succeeded by Sir John Irwin
Preceded by Sir Robert Rich	Governor of Londonderry; 1774–1775	Succeeded by Sir John Irwin
Preceded by Robert Boyd (acting)	Governor of Gibraltar; 1777–1790	Succeeded by Robert Boyd
Peerage of Great Britain
New creation	Baron Heathfield; 1787–1790	Succeeded by Francis Augustus Eliott
