= Baron Heathfield =

Barony in the Peerage of Great Britain

Main page/Article George Augustus Eliott, 1st Baron Heathfield

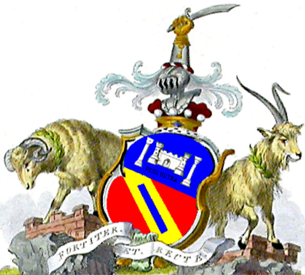
Heraldic achievement of Eliott, Barons Heathfield: Gules, on a bend or a baton azure on a chief azure between two pillars the fortress of Gibraltar argent under it Plus Ultra as augmentation. These are the arms of the Eliott Baronets of Stobs, with augmentation for George Augustus Eliott, the 1st Baron Heathfield and youngest son of the 3rd Baronet. The pillars represent the Pillars of Hercules, the classical world's name for the opposing shores of the Straits of Gibraltar, which together with the Latin motto Plus Ultra ("more beyond") were adopted by Charles V, Holy Roman Emperor, King Charles I of Spain (1500-1558) as supporters to his coat of arms, and were still used as the Royal arms of Spain by King Charles III of Spain (1759-1788) as they are today

Baron Heathfield of Gibraltar, was a title in the Peerage of Great Britain. It was created on 6 July 1787 for General Sir George Augustus Eliott in recognition of his defence of Gibraltar during the Franco-Spanish Siege of 1779 to 1783. He was the tenth but eighth surviving son of Sir Gilbert Eliott, 3rd Baronet, of Stobs (see Eliott baronets). The title became extinct on the death of his only son, the childless second Baron, in 1813.

== Barons Heathfield (1787) ==
- George Augustus Eliott, 1st Baron Heathfield (1717–1790)
- Francis Augustus Eliott, 2nd Baron Heathfield (1750–1813)

== Coat of arms ==
- Arms: Gules, on a bend or a baton azure on a chief of the last the fortress of Gibraltar winged with turrets between two pillars argent masoned sable, the gate of the castle of the last charged with a key of the second and below the same the words "Plus Ultra" ("more beyond").
- Crest: A dexter arm holding a cutlass proper, the arm charged with a key.
- Supporters: Dexter, a ram; sinister, a goat; each wreathed with flowers round the neck.
- Motto: Fortiter et recte ("boldly and rightly")
