= North Front Cemetery =

Cemetery in Gibraltar

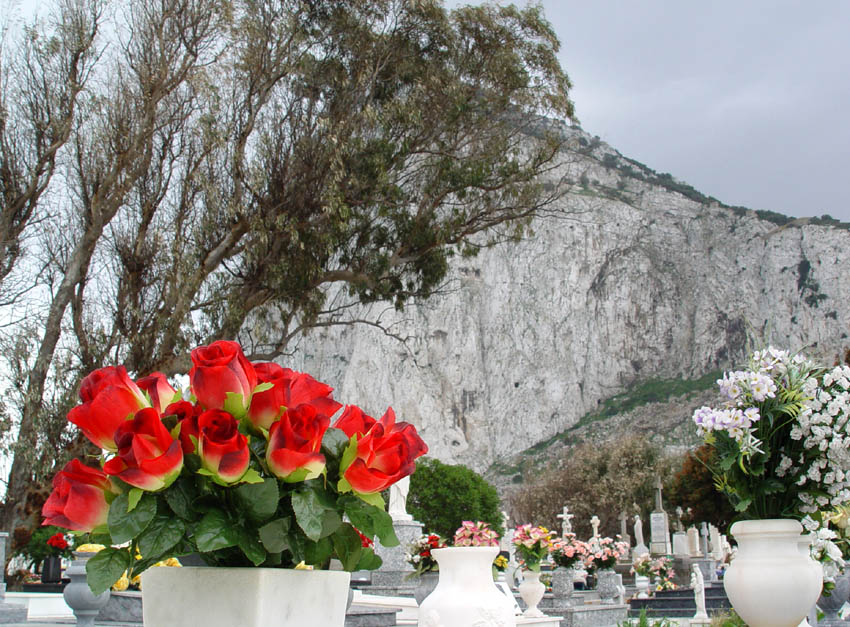
- View from North Front Cemetery looking south towards the Rock of Gibraltar.
- Interactive map of North Front Cemetery

Details
- Established: 1756
- Location: Devil's Tower Road
- Country: Gibraltar
- Coordinates: 36.14905°N 5.34483°W
- Owned by: Government of Gibraltar
- Website: Cemetery details. Commonwealth War Graves Commission.
- Find a Grave: North Front Cemetery

The North Front Cemetery is a cemetery located in the British Overseas Territory of Gibraltar. Also known as the Gibraltar Cemetery and the Garrison Cemetery, it is the only graveyard still in use in Gibraltar. It is also the only Commonwealth War Graves Commission (CWGC) cemetery in Gibraltar. The two CWGC monuments, the Gibraltar Memorial and the Gibraltar Cross of Sacrifice, are positioned nearby at the junction of Winston Churchill Avenue and Devil's Tower Road.

== History ==
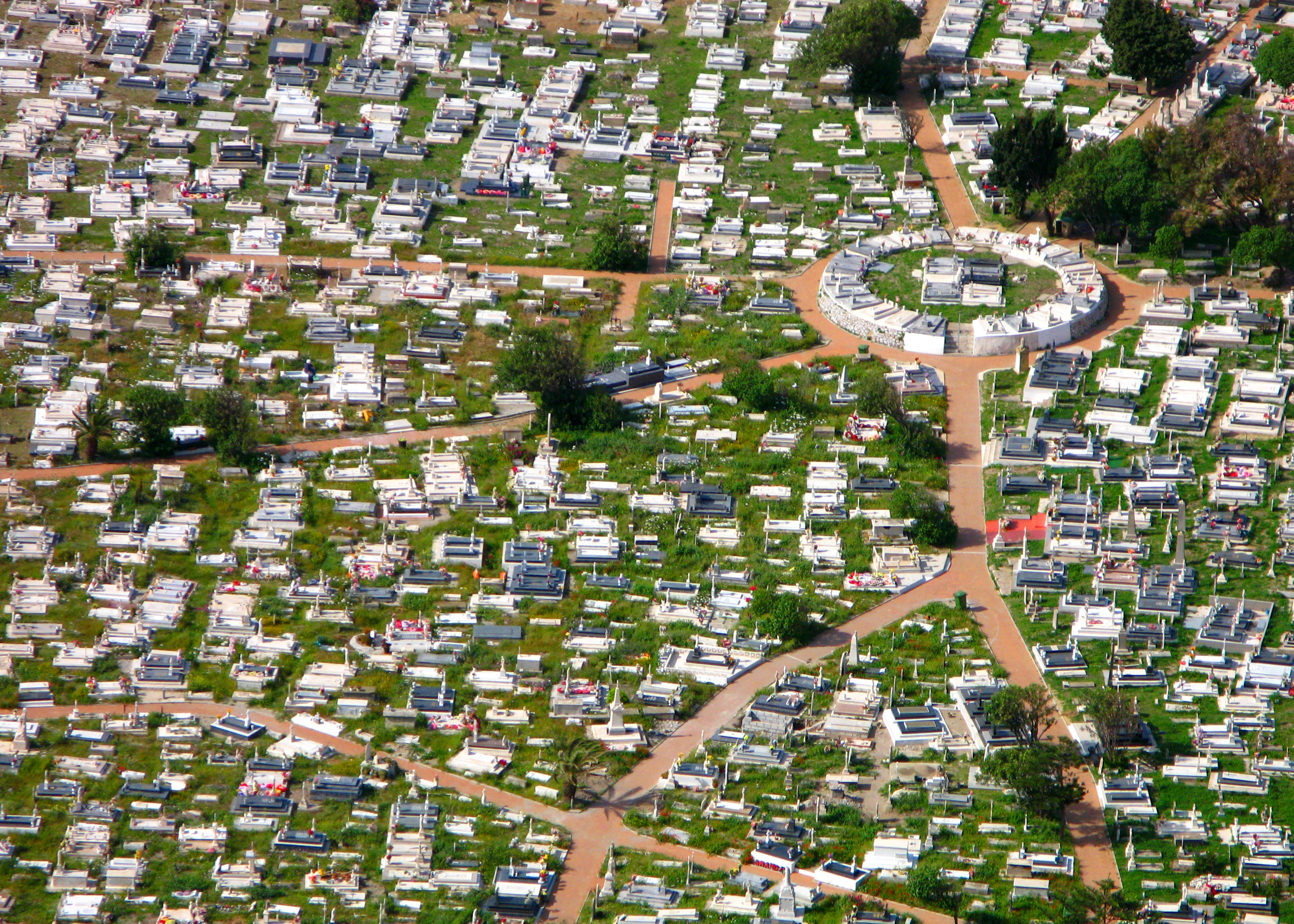
View of North Front Cemetery as seen from the Great Siege Tunnels.

The North Front Cemetery is located in the North District of Gibraltar, the British Overseas Territory at the southern end of the Iberian Peninsula. It is situated between the north face of the Rock of Gibraltar to the south and the airport to the north. The cemetery is located off Devil's Tower Road, just west of Devil's Tower Camp. Also known as the Gibraltar Cemetery and the Garrison Cemetery, it was established in 1756 south of the neutral ground and the border with Spain. A French map made of Gibraltar in 1811 shows that the cemetery was well established.

The graveyard was initially divided into five sections. In addition, to those for members of the Church of England, and Presbyterian, Wesleyan, and Catholic Churches, there was a fifth section for those of other denominations. In May 1848, Jews' Gate Cemetery on Windmill Hill was closed to burials. After that closure, a sixth section, for Jews, was established in North Front Cemetery. In the 21st century, only three sections are present, Christian, Jewish, and unconsecrated. The North Front Cemetery is also a military cemetery, and includes the graves of those who died in the World Wars.

The North Front Cemetery is the only graveyard which is still in use in Gibraltar. In addition to the 1848 closure of Jews' Gate Cemetery, Trafalgar Cemetery fell into disuse after 1814. St. Jago's Cemetery was also closed and, by the early twentieth century, its grounds had been incorporated into the St. Jago's Barracks recreational facilities.

The authority in charge of North Front Cemetery is the Superintendent of the Cemetery. The staff includes a Keeper of the Cemetery, as well as eight gravediggers and eight people responsible for maintenance. In 1889, the Cemetery Act was passed; it set procedures regarding management and supervision of North Front Cemetery.

The graves of two Governors of Gibraltar are present in North Front Cemetery: Lieutenant-General Sir Lothian Nicholson (1827–1893) and General Sir Kenneth Anderson (1891–1959). Sir Joshua Hassan (1915–1997), Chief Minister and Mayor of Gibraltar, was buried in the Hebrew section of the cemetery. In addition, both Thomas Henry Kavanagh (1821–1882), awarded the Victoria Cross, and George Campbell Henderson (1910–1951), who received the George Cross posthumously after the Bedenham explosion, are interred at North Front. Kavanagh has the distinction of being the only recipient of the Victoria Cross buried in Gibraltar. His gravestone was restored about 2008.

== Commonwealth war graves ==
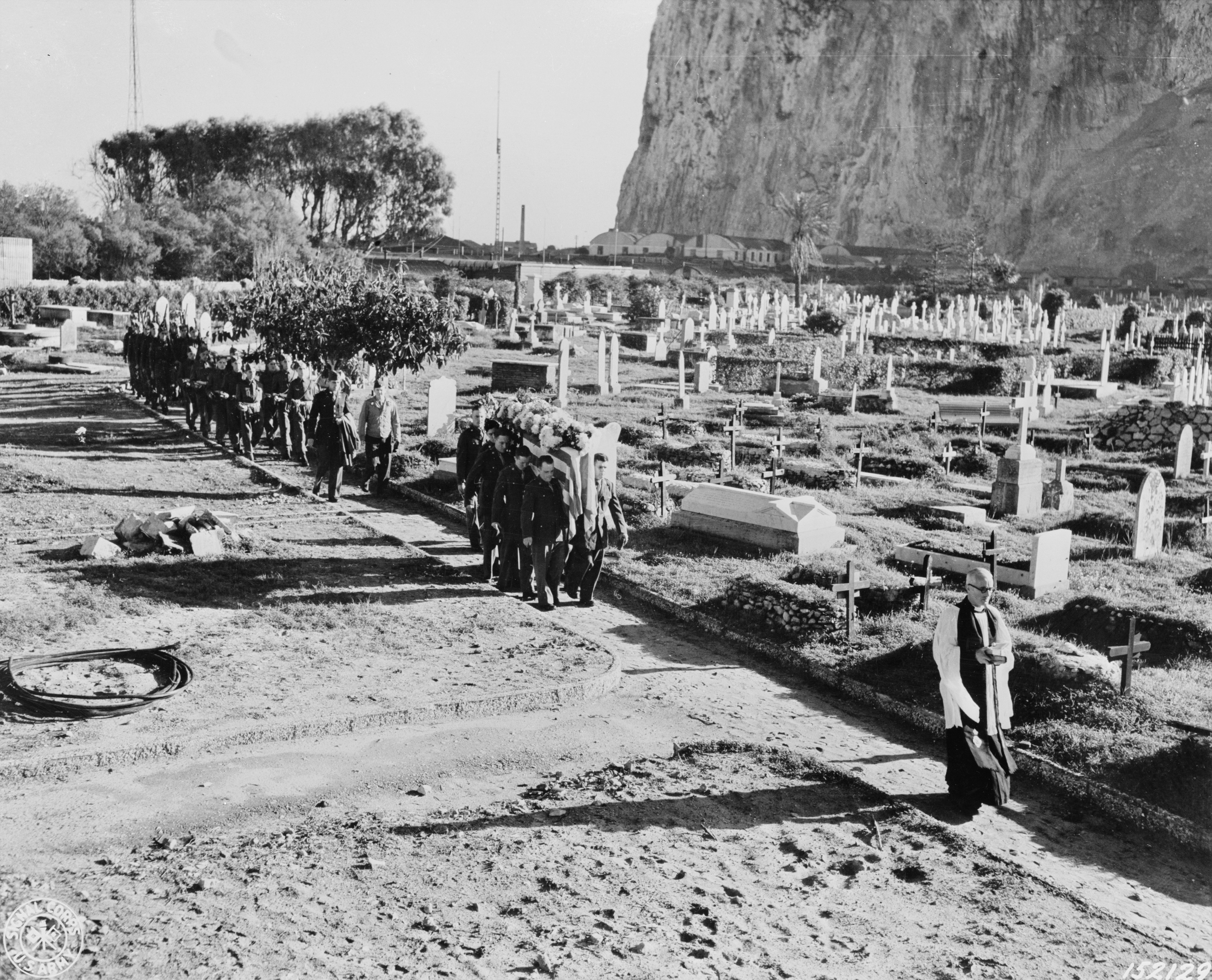
Funeral services held at North Front Cemetery for Second Lieutenant Paul B. Bateman, US pilot, during the Second World War.

North Front Cemetery is the only Commonwealth War Graves Commission cemetery in Gibraltar. More than 750 Commonwealth soldiers of the two World Wars, as well as 41 of the fallen of other nationalities, are buried or commemorated at the cemetery. This includes two graves in the Hebrew section. Most of the Commonwealth war graves for the fallen of the Second World War are located in two plots, one triangular and the other rectangular, at the northern end of the cemetery. Others are scattered around the graveyard, as are those from the First World War. The majority of the Commonwealth war graves are from World War II. After the First World War, a Cross of Sacrifice was installed west of the cemetery. A second monument was erected after the Second World War near the cross. The second monument, the Gibraltar Memorial, commemorates 98 lost or buried at sea.

The First World War graves are primarily those of soldiers who died at British Military Hospital Gibraltar or on vessels passing by Gibraltar. They include the tombs of 23 men who died on HMS Britannia when she sank on 9 November 1918 after a submarine attack off Cape Trafalgar. Also included are the graves of seamen who succumbed from natural causes during the course of the war. The Second World War graves are primarily those of soldiers from the garrison, including those who lost their lives while doing military construction and those who were attacked by aircraft. Among the dead were soldiers who had been taken prisoner in France and died following their escape to Gibraltar. Also included were the graves of four Frenchmen who died when their aircraft crashed into the sea during a landing attempt.

== Gibraltar Memorial ==
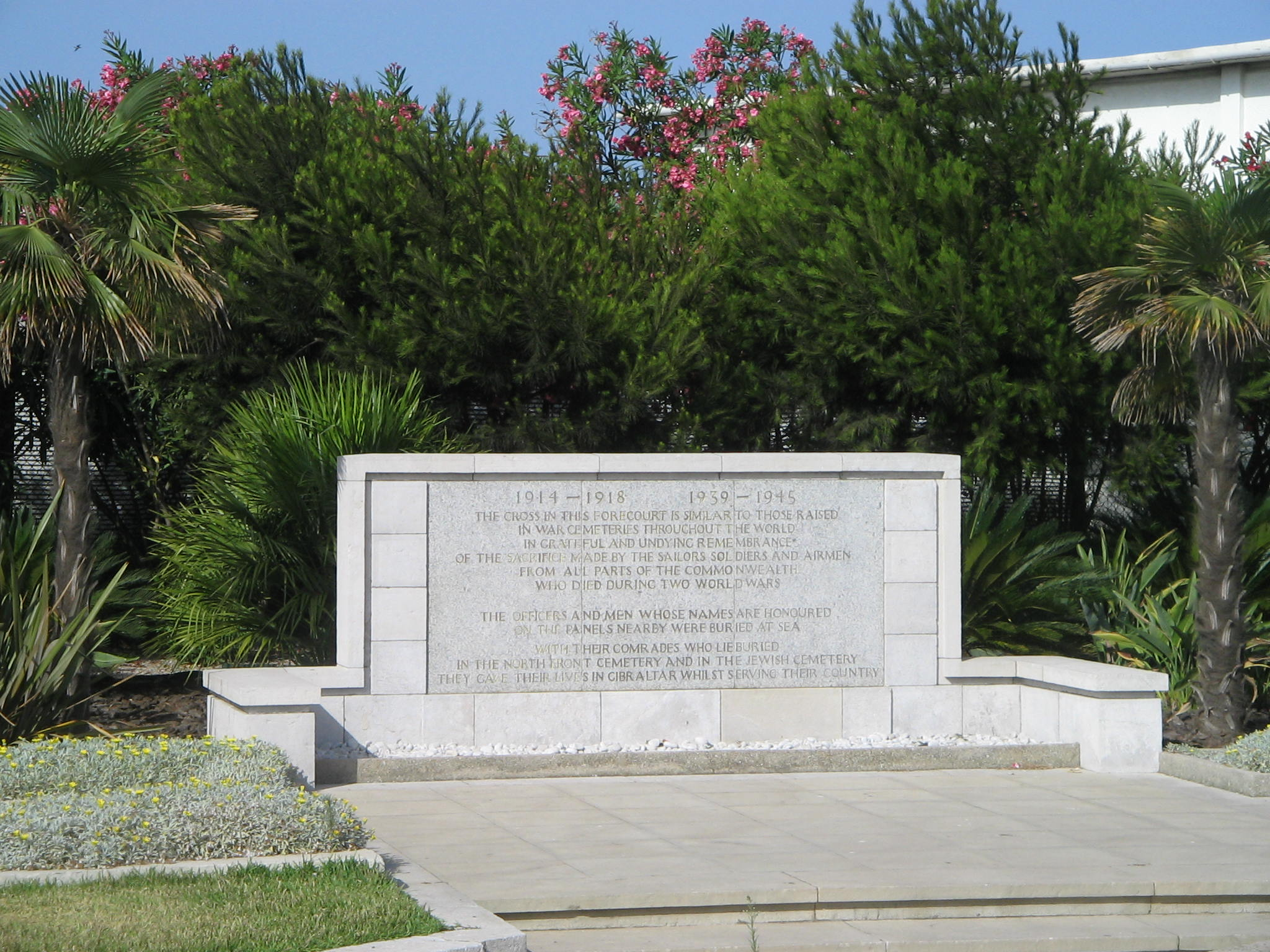
The Gibraltar Memorial

The Gibraltar Memorial is located together with the Cross of Sacrifice in a triangular, fenced site west of the North Front Cemetery. The memorial site is at the northeast corner of the intersection of Winston Churchill Avenue and Devil's Tower Road. The Gibraltar Memorial and the Cross of Sacrifice are connected by paths which lead to a central panel containing an inscription.

The Gibraltar Memorial was erected by the Commonwealth War Graves Commission. It commemorates 91 soldiers who died during the Second World War and were buried at sea. In addition to the names of those military men, the names of seven of the fallen of the First World War have been added. Those seven soldiers died when the SS Woodfield was attacked by a submarine on 3 November 1915 and sunk 64 kilometres (40 mi) off Ceuta. The original monument to the men in North Front Cemetery was demolished.

Steps rise up to the Gibraltar Memorial, which is positioned behind the cross. The monument is constructed of limestone, within which have been inserted panels of Cornish granite that match the Cross of Sacrifice and bear the inscribed names of the fallen. The nearby central panel explains:

The Officers And Men Whose Names Are Honoured on the Panels Nearby Were Buried at Sea With Their Comrades Who Lie Buried in the North Front Cemetery And in the Jewish Cemetery They Gave Their Lives at Gibraltar While Serving Their Country

== Gibraltar Cross of Sacrifice ==
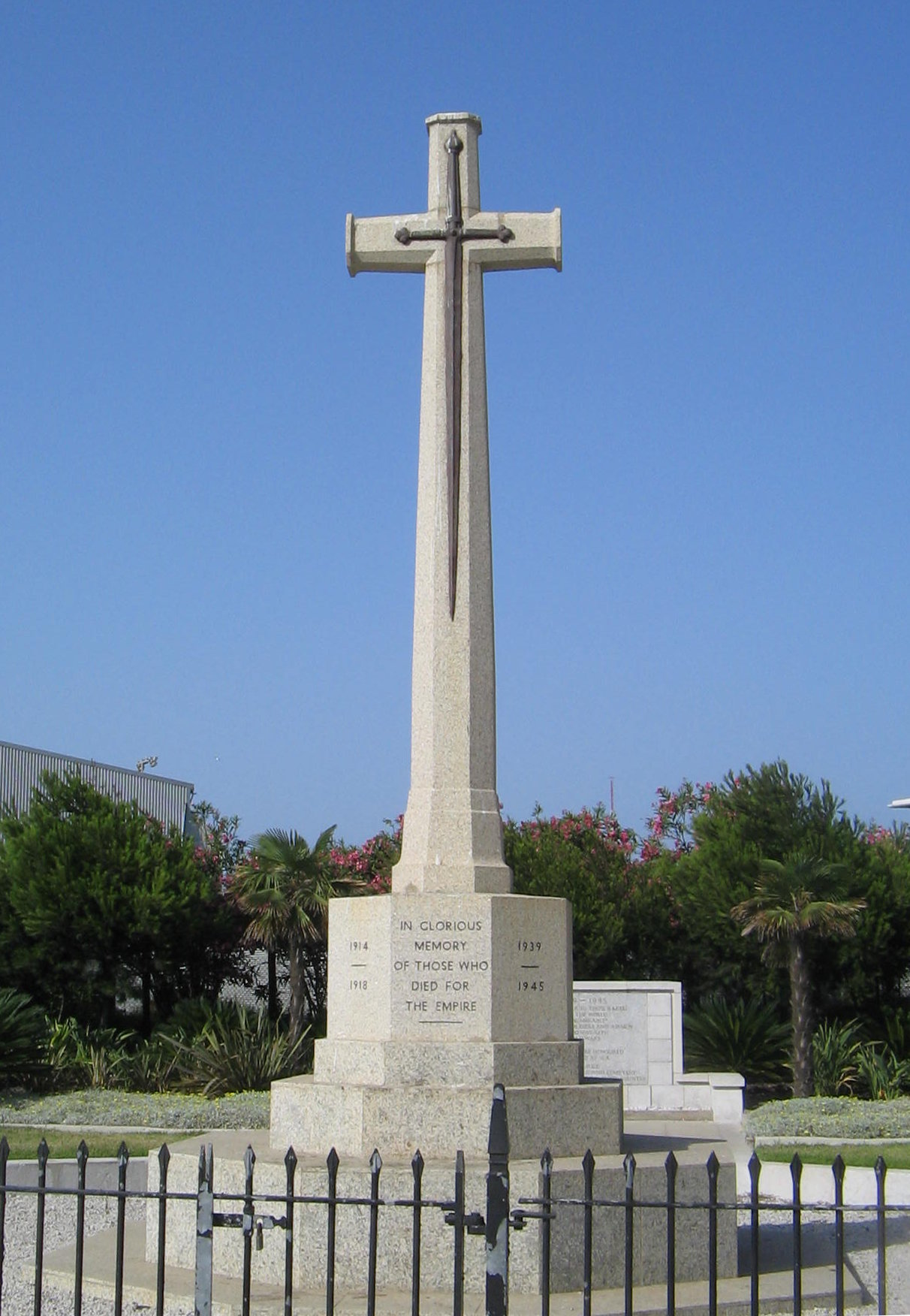
The Gibraltar Cross of Sacrifice

The Cross of Sacrifice is positioned together with the Gibraltar Memorial in the fenced area west of the cemetery, at the corner of Winston Churchill Avenue and Devil's Tower Road. Both monuments are connected by paths to a central inscribed panel. The Cross of Sacrifice was constructed of Cornish granite, and erected by the Commonwealth War Graves Commission, then the Imperial War Graves Commission, after World War I. The monument was unveiled on Armistice Day 1922 by Governor of Gibraltar Sir Horace Lockwood Smith-Dorrien. At the base of the cross, in addition to the dates "1914 – 1918" and "1939 – 1945," is the inscription "In Glorious Memory of Those Who Died For The Empire." On an adjacent plaque is inscribed: "Erected By The Royal Engineers For The Imperial War Graves Commission And Unveiled on Armistice Day 1922 By H. E. Gen. Sir H. L. Smith-Dorrien GCB-GCMG-DSO Governor and Commander-In-Chief Gibraltar." A portion of the inscription on the nearby panel reads:

1914–1918 1939–1945 The Cross in This Forecourt Is Similar To Those Raised in War Cemeteries Throughout The World in Grateful And Undying Remembrance of the Sacrifice Made By Sailors Soldiers And Airmen From All Parts of the Commonwealth Who Died During Two World Wars

In 2004, Gibraltar celebrated its tercentenary anniversary of British rule. Some veterans who had served in Gibraltar were invited to an all-expenses-paid trip to The Rock. In July 2004, the schedule of events included a memorial service at the Cross of Sacrifice which included the Royal British Legion.
