= Devil's Tower Road =

Street in Gibraltar

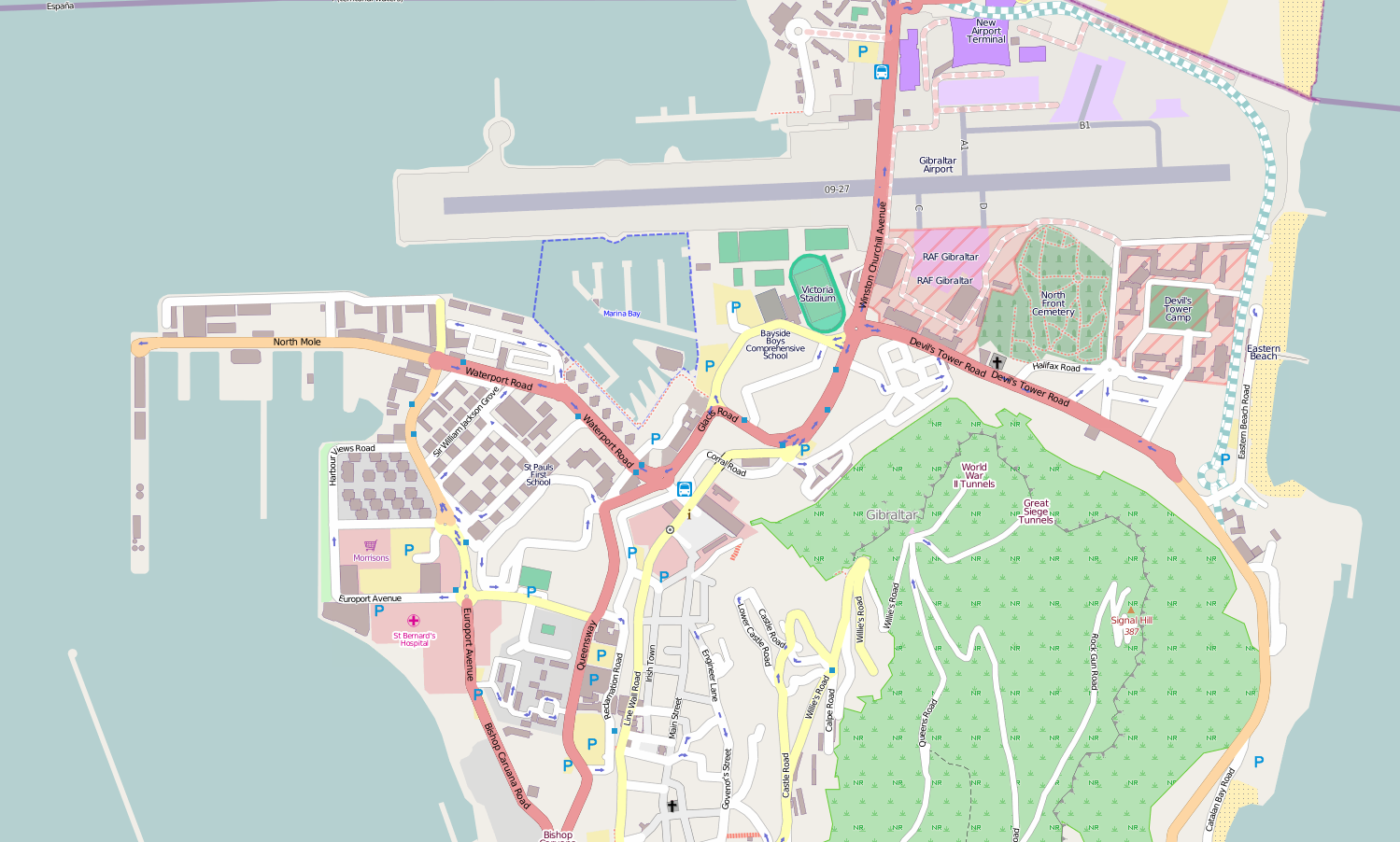
- Devil's Tower Road extends southeast from Winston Churchill Avenue.
- Location: Gibraltar
- Coordinates: 36.147310°N 5.344977°W
- East: Eastern Beach Road
- West: Winston Churchill Avenue

Devil's Tower Road is a road in the British Overseas Territory of Gibraltar. The road, in the northeastern part of the settlement, runs south of Gibraltar International Airport, from Winston Churchill Avenue southeast to Eastern Beach Road. It was named after Devil's Tower, a seventeenth-century watchtower that was formerly at the eastern end of the road. By 2011, Devil's Tower Road had been changed to a dual carriageway, with on-street parking eliminated, and the Government's plan to change the name of the road to North Front Avenue met with community opposition. A new access road was planned, such that Winston Churchill Avenue, which crosses the airport runway, would no longer serve as the main road to the Gibraltar-Spain border to intersect with Devil's Tower Road after passing under the eastern edge of the runway. The new road and tunnel, named Kingsway with the approval of Charles III, was officially opened on 31 March 2023.

== Overview and early history ==
Devil's Tower Road is a street in Gibraltar, the British Overseas Territory at the southern end of the Iberian Peninsula. The road, in northeastern Gibraltar, generally runs in an east–west direction; it is one of only two roads in Gibraltar to cross the full width of the peninsula. Located south of Gibraltar International Airport, North Front Cemetery, and Devil's Tower Camp, it extends from the roundabout at Winston Churchill Avenue east to Eastern Beach Road and provides access to the northern and eastern sides of Gibraltar. The road was named after Devil's Tower, a seventeenth-century watchtower which was located at the eastern end of the road. The whole territory north of this road was not ceded by Spain to Britain in the Treaty of Utrecht and, therefore, Spain does not recognize the British administration on it.

== Recent history ==
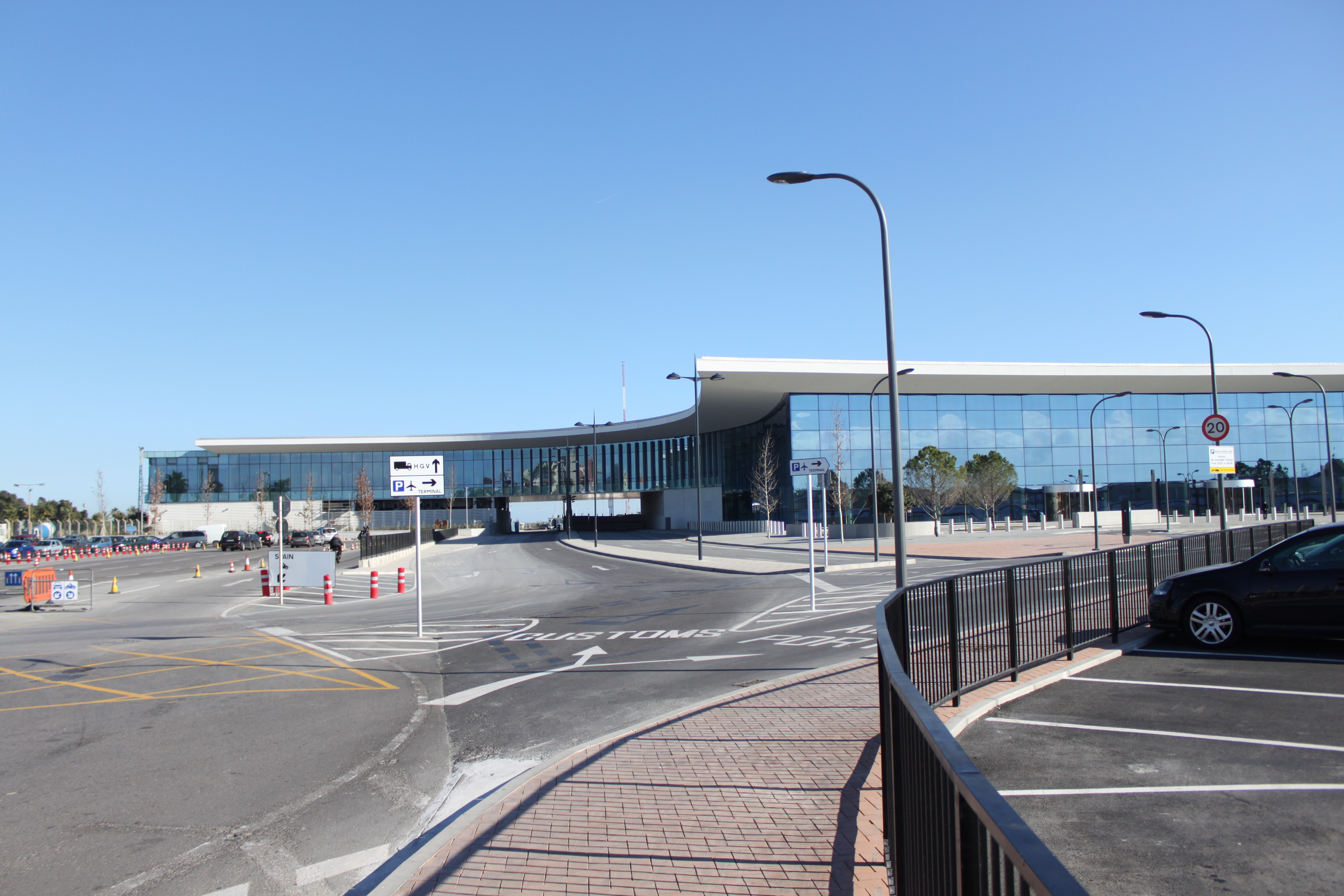
New terminal at Gibraltar International Airport

In May 2007, the Gibraltar government revealed plans for a new terminal at the Gibraltar International Airport, as well as the new road to the North Front which – per stipulations in the Córdoba Agreement – was not allowed to cross the runway. It was to be diverted, first passing along Devil's Tower Road. At the junction with Eastern Beach Road, there would be a roundabout. The new road, a four lane road, with two lanes in each direction, would U-turn to the north and parallel Eastern Beach Road. Then, it would go through a tunnel at the eastern end of the runway. After emerging on the north side, the new road would parallel the frontier extending to the west. The road would then split, with one branch leading to the terminal, North Front, and Winston Churchill Avenue, and the other leading to the border itself and the loop of road north of the runway. Winston Churchill Avenue would continue to cross the runway, but would only be used for emergencies or other exceptions. Pedestrian traffic across the runway would be unchanged.

In May 2009, the government announced that Devil's Tower Road would be changed to a divided highway, to connect the new road at the North Front with Winston Churchill Avenue. In addition, the route of the road's eastern end would be linked with a new roundabout adjacent to Eastern Beach. The redevelopment of the road continued into 2011. After the change of Devil's Tower Road to a dual carriageway, parking on the road was eliminated. Instead, parking spaces were made available at a new parking garage on Devil's Tower Road and an enlarged parking lot at Forbes' Quarry.

In May 2011, the Government of Gibraltar revealed that it was renaming Devil's Tower Road as North Front Avenue, as it would no longer pass in close proximity to the former site of Devil's Tower. The proposal was met with opposition, from both citizens and political parties, owing to the historical significance of the road and perceivedly unnecessary inconvenience to residents. The Gibraltar Socialist Labour Party (GSLP)/Liberal Opposition suggested instead that the road be named Bishop Devlin Avenue to commemorate the late Bishop Bernard Devlin, the former pastor of St. Theresa's Church for many years, who was said to have always been "uncomfortable for a church to be located in a road of that name." On 2 June 2011, a one-hour silent protest organized by lawyer Patrick Canessa was held over the announced plans to change the names of both Devil's Tower Road and Cannon Lane.

The project for a new road has since been cancelled, reportedly for "the contractor's failure to comply with the terms of the contract and to proceed with the works as required by the contract." This decision was met with legal action from the contractor, the Spanish-based Obrascón Huarte Lain. In August 2012, Gibraltar's government began a new tender process for construction of an access road and tunnel, with the closing date for submission of bids 12 Oct 2012.

== Notable buildings and monuments ==
- The North Front Cemetery, established in 1756, is the only cemetery still in use in Gibraltar. A section for Jews was opened in 1848, after Jews' Gate Cemetery on Windmill Hill was closed for burials on 6 May 1848. The North Front Cemetery is the only Commonwealth War Graves Commission Cemetery in Gibraltar.
- The Gibraltar Memorial and the Gibraltar Cross of Sacrifice were erected by the Commonwealth War Graves Commission at the corner of Devil's Tower Road and Winston Churchill Avenue. The monuments commemorate the fallen of World War I and World War II.
- The foundation stone of the new St. Theresa's Church was laid in 1992 by Bishop Devlin. St. Theresa's had formally become a parish in 1974. However, Mass has been celebrated for "parishioners" since the end of World War II.
- Devil's Tower Camp is the headquarters of the Royal Gibraltar Regiment. It is one of the four major remaining Ministry of Defence sites, the others being the Naval Base, the Airfield, and Four Corners.
- The Princess Royal Medical Centre at Devil's Tower Camp replaced the Royal Naval Hospital Gibraltar, which closed in 2008. The following year, on 5 March 2009, the medical centre was inaugurated by Anne, Princess Royal.
- The Devil's Tower Emplacement is a World War II monument. A plaque on the bunker reads: "The Devil's Tower Emplacement Guarding The Caledonian Canal and Tank Trap which Existed Some Metres In Front Of This Spot During World War II (1939 -1945)."

== Gallery ==
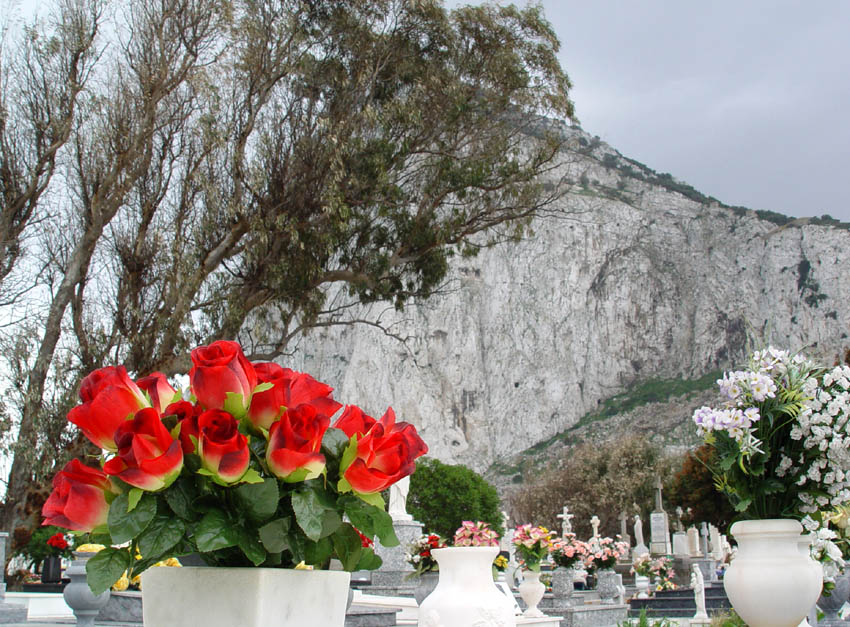
North Front Cemetery

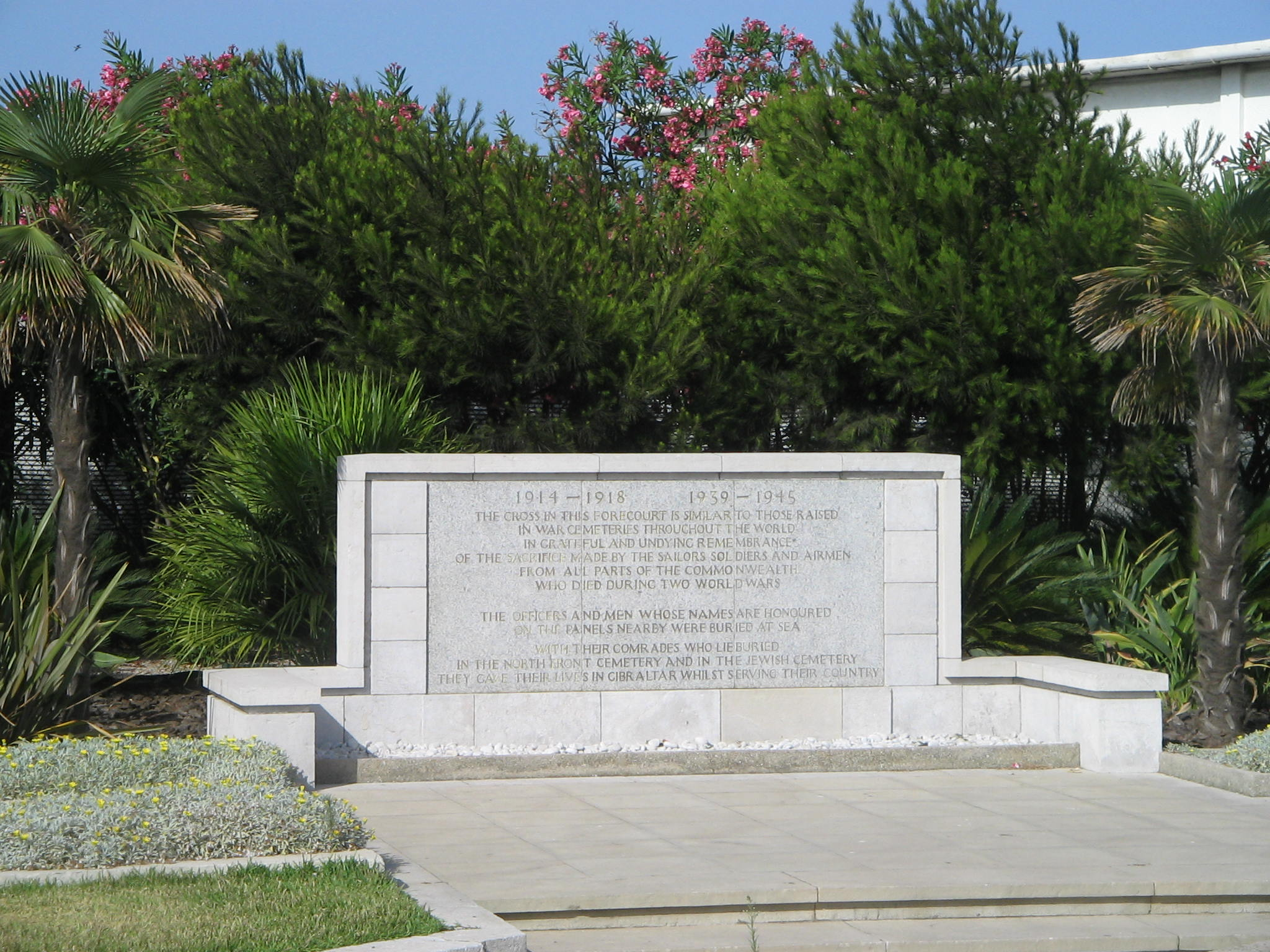
Gibraltar Memorial

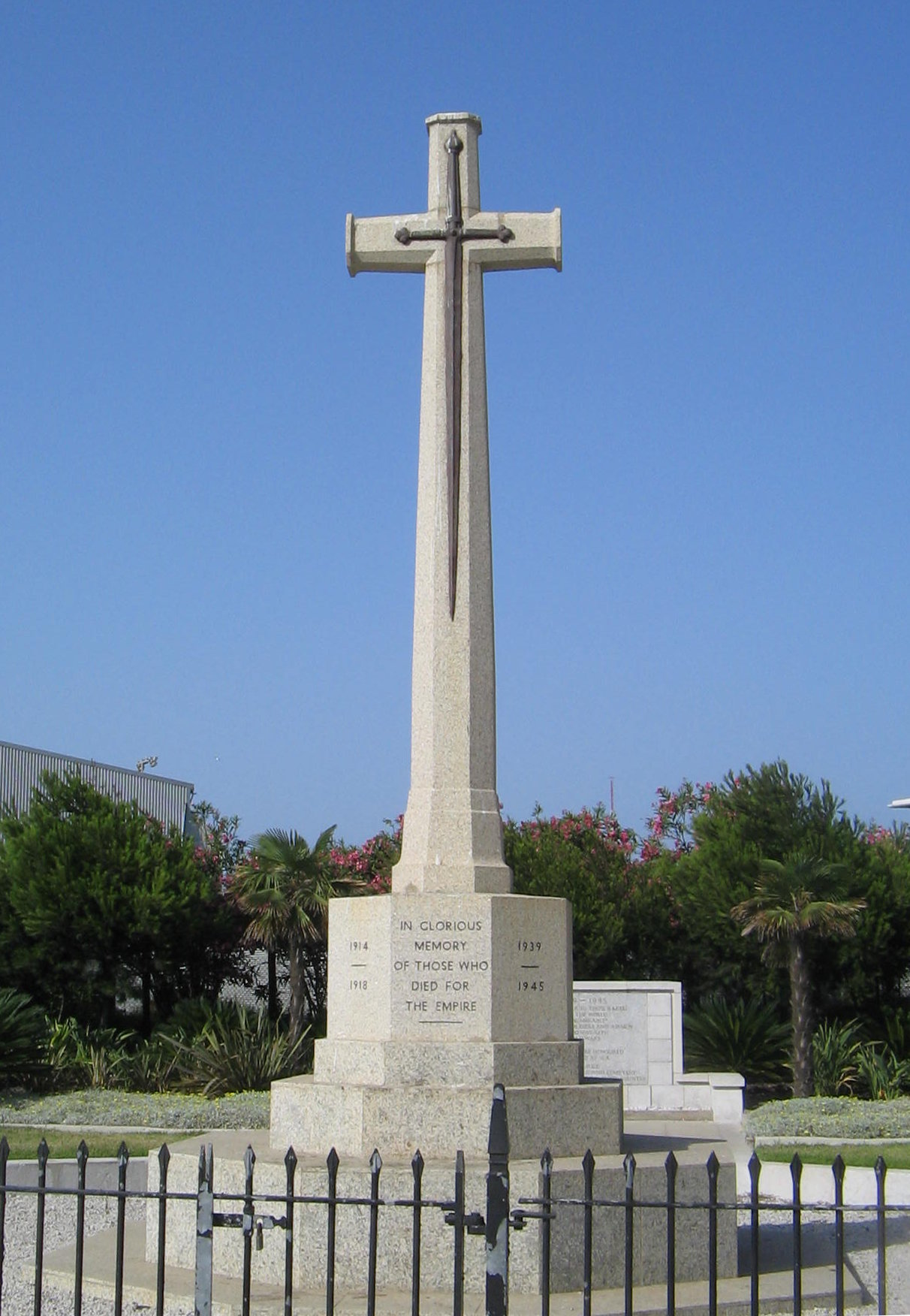
Gibraltar Cross of Sacrifice

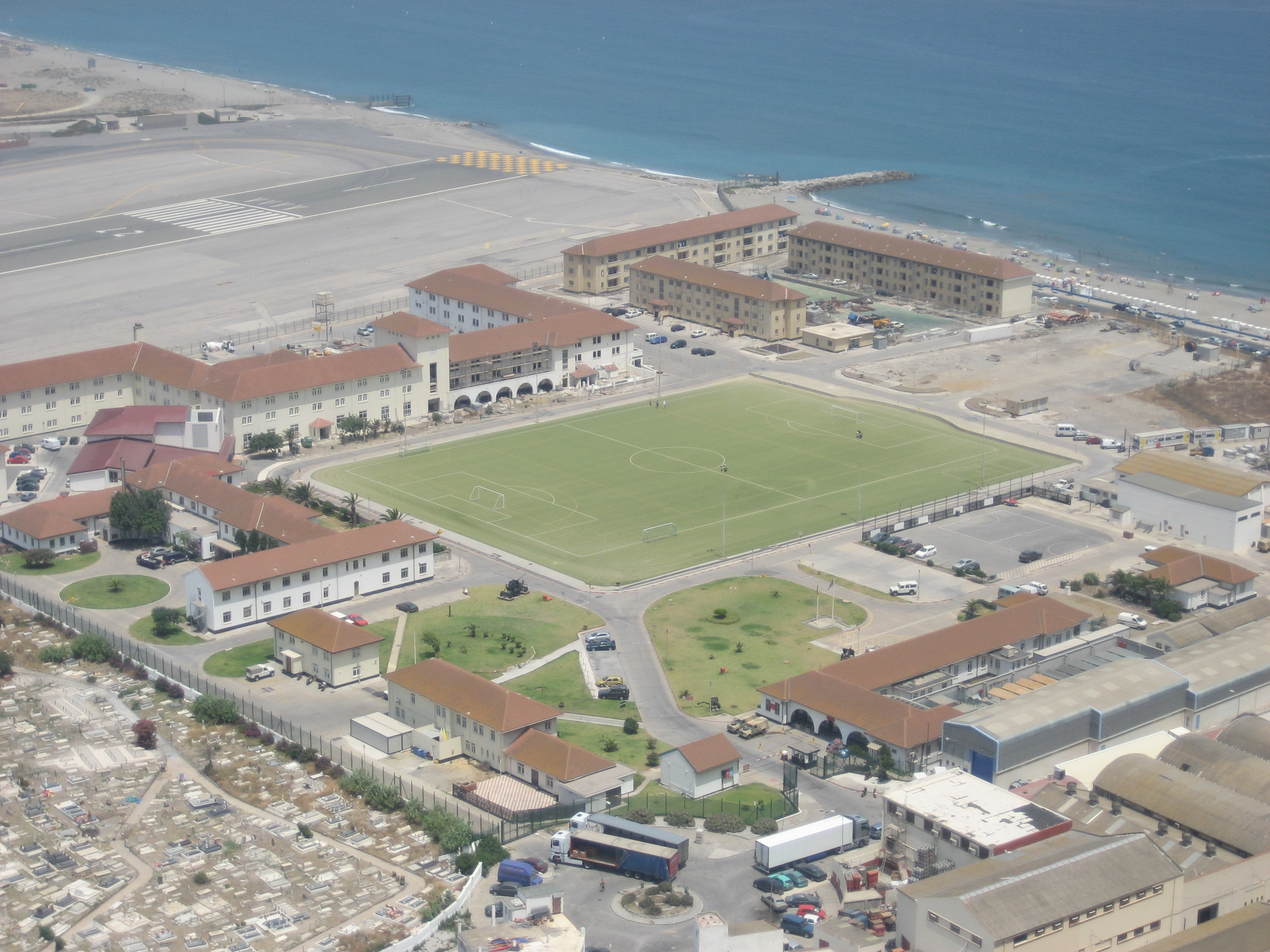
Devil's Tower Camp

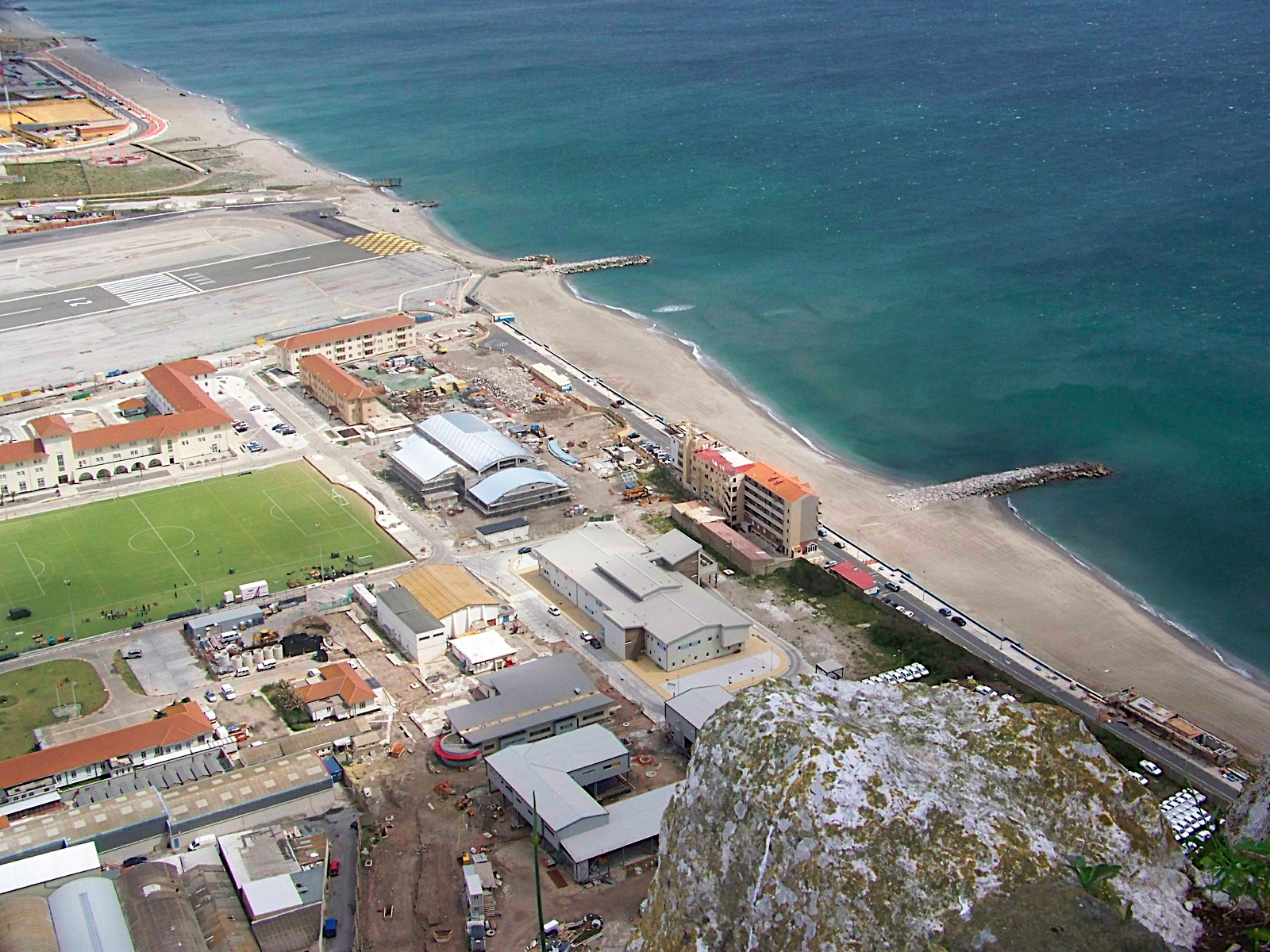
Princess Royal Medical Centre
