= Winston Churchill Avenue =

Winston Churchill Avenue may refer to:

- Winston Churchill Avenue, Dominican Republic
- Winston Churchill Avenue, Gibraltar
- Avenue Winston-Churchill, in the 8th arrondissement of Paris
