= Devil's Tower (Gibraltar) =

Archaeological site

- Torre del Diablo
- Part of Fortifications of Gibraltar
- Devil's Tower Road, Gibraltar
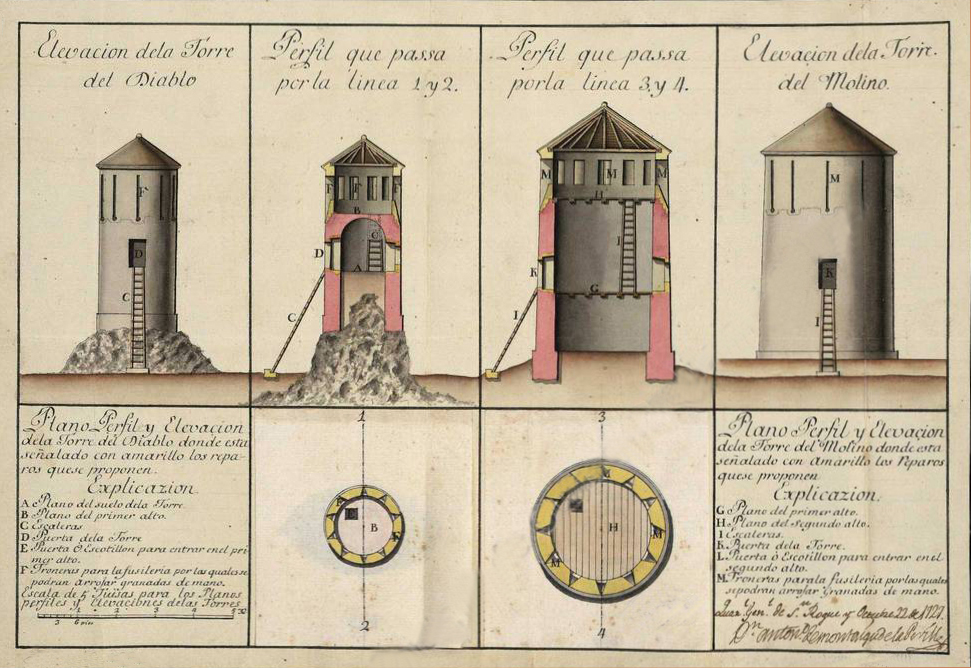
- 1727 plan of Devil's Tower and Mill Tower.

Site information
- Type: Watchtower
- Condition: Demolished

Location
- Original location of Devil's Tower within Gibraltar.
- Coordinates: 36.146143°N 5.341701°W

Site history
- Demolished: 1940

The Devil's Tower was an ancient watchtower in the British Overseas Territory of Gibraltar close to a rock shelter where fossil remains of a Neanderthal child were discovered, together with palaeolithic tools. The Tower and remains, however, were unrelated.

== Construction ==
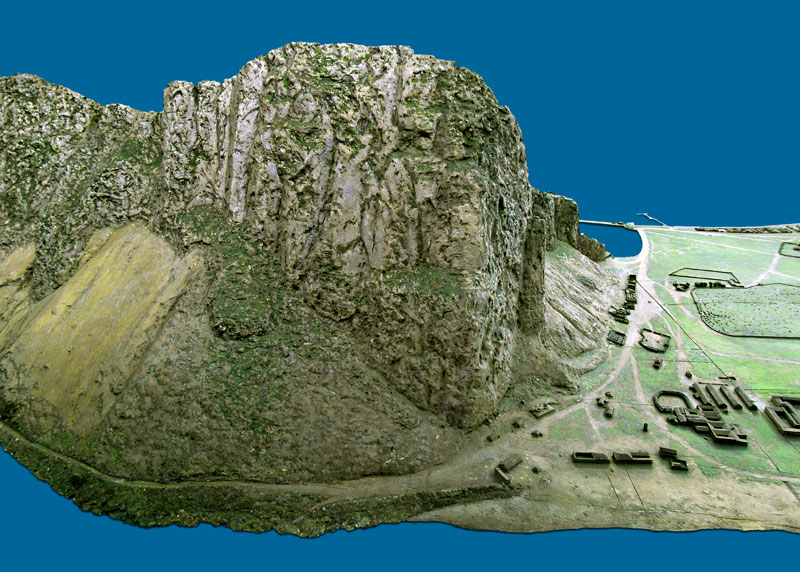
1865 model of the Rock of Gibraltar showing the location of the Devil's Tower in the bottom right of the photo.

The tower was constructed in limestone. It was demolished in 1940 during World War II on the orders of Governor General Sir Noel Mason-Macfarlane on the grounds that it was in the line of fire of one of Gibraltar's many guns.

== Devil's Tower skull ==
The Devil's Tower skull was that of a Neanderthal child. The remains were excavated by Dorothy Garrod in a Mousterian shelter on the site in 1926. There is evidence of an injury to the mouth, and the teeth show developmental disorders consistent with seasonal starvation. The classic Neanderthal large brain case is evident and the brow ridges have started to develop. The skull substantially reinforced the evidence of the Neanderthals of Gibraltar.

Most of the lower jaw has survived, along with the frontal bone, most of the right side of the face and the left parietal bone.

== Eponymy ==
The tower gave its name to the Devil's Tower Camp, the Devils Tower Emplacement, Devil's Tower Road and other nearby places.
