= St. Theresa's Church, Gibraltar =

St. Theresa's Church
- St. Theresa's Church, Gibraltar
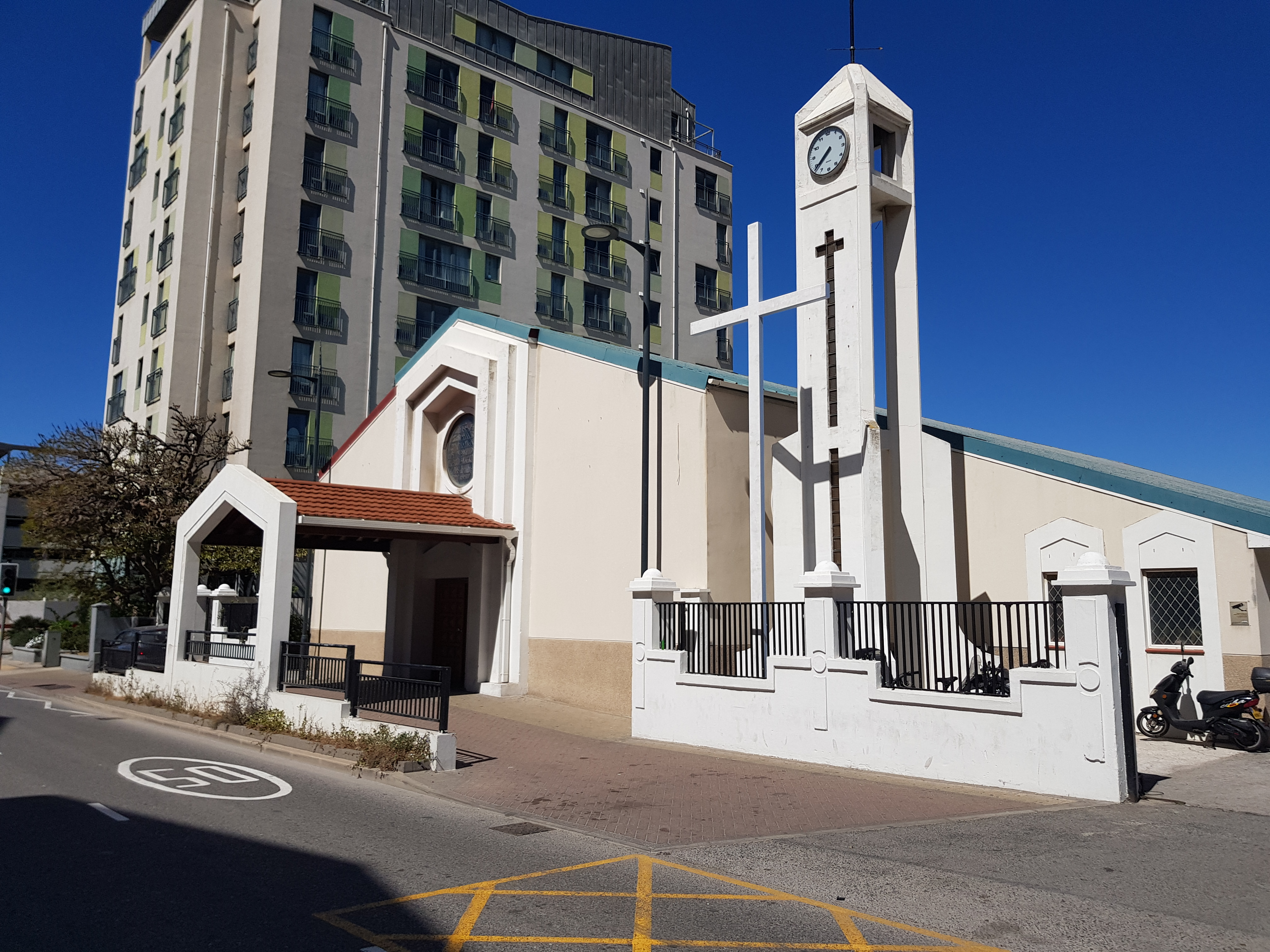
- St. Theresa's Church
- 36.147648°N 5.345964°W
- Location: Devil's Tower Road
- Country: Gibraltar
- Denomination: Roman Catholic

St. Theresa's Church is a Catholic church in Gibraltar. It is located in northeastern Gibraltar, along Devil's Tower Road.

Former priests at the church include Bernard Devlin who went on to be the Roman Catholic Bishop of Gibraltar. The Gibraltar government proposed to rename the road which the church is on Bishop Devlin Lane but the name Devil's Tower Road was retained. The foundation stone of the new church was laid in 1992 by Bishop Devlin. St. Theresa's had formally become a parish in 1974 when Devlin became Parish priest. However, Mass has been celebrated for "parishioners" since the end of World War II.
