= Explosion of the RFA Bedenham =

British cargo ship; 1951 event

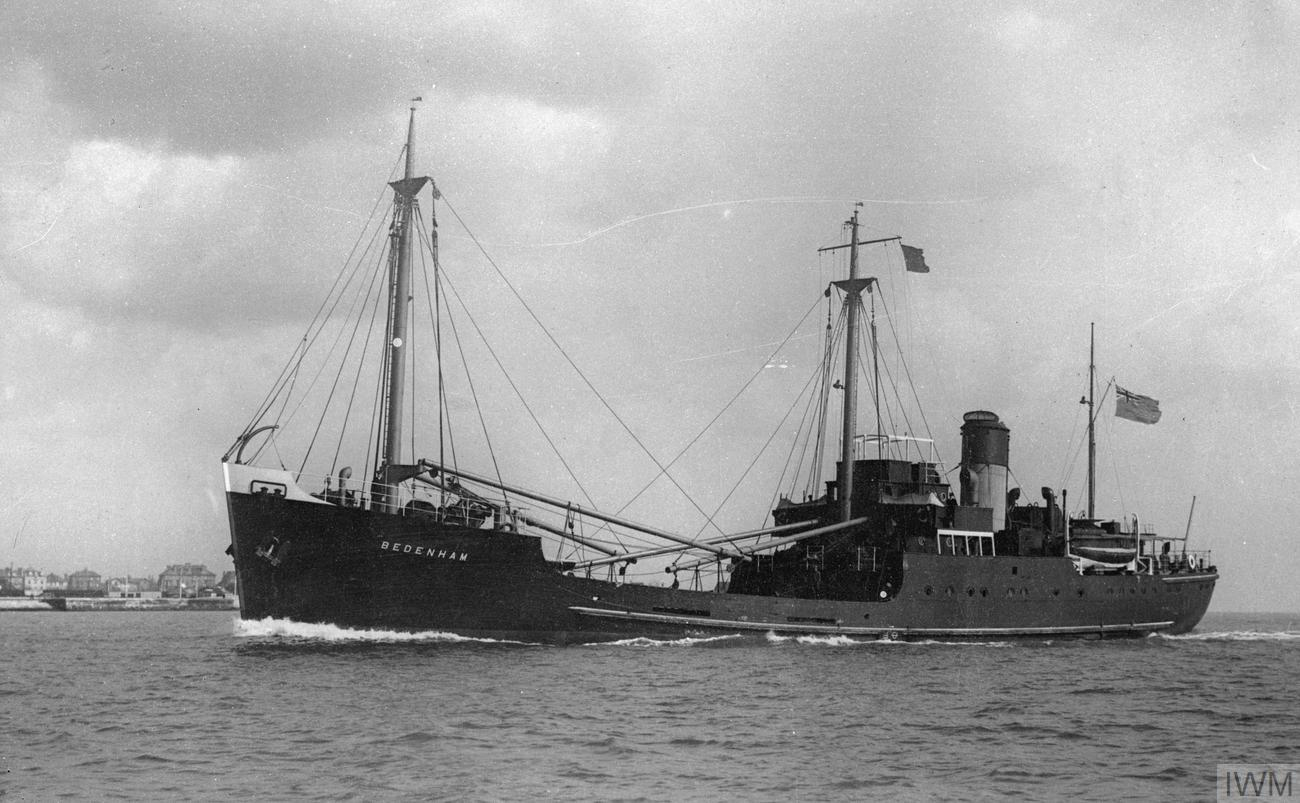
- The former RFA Bedenham, c. 1950

History
- Name: Bedenham
- Owner: Admiralty
- Operator: Naval Armament Department
- Builder: Ailsa Shipbuilding, Troon
- Launched: 26 September 1938
- Completed: 1938
- Out of service: 1951
- Fate: Exploded at Gun Wharf, Gibraltar 36.135183°N 5.355096°W

General characteristics
- Class & type: Naval armament carrier
- Tonnage: 1191 GRT
- Length: 230 ft (70 m)
- Beam: 37.5 ft (11.4 m)
- Depth: 16.5 feet
- Propulsion: Steam triple expansion
- Speed: 10 knots (19 km/h; 12 mph) loaded

RFA Bedenham was a naval armament carrier of the British Royal Fleet Auxiliary that exploded while docked in Gibraltar on 27 April 1951, killing 13 people and causing a great deal of damage to the town. (Note: This event should not be confused with the explosion at the Bedenham Pier in Portsmouth Harbour, which occurred on 14 July 1950.)

== Cause of the explosion ==
The Bedenham arrived in Gibraltar on 24 April 1951, tying up at Gun Wharf. On the morning of 27 April, depth charges were being unloaded into a lighter when one of them ignited. Several men were organised to fight the fire from the quayside, but to no avail. Eventually all the other firefighters withdrew except George Campbell Henderson, a sub-officer with the dockyard fire service, who doggedly held a firehose into the fire. An explosion in the lighter caused a fire which spread to the Bedenham, triggering a violent explosion in which the bow was blown out of the water and onto Gun Wharf, while the rest of the ship sank.

== Casualties ==
Thirteen people were killed in the explosion, including Henderson, who was posthumously awarded the George Cross for his bravery in attempting to extinguish the fire. The King's Police and Fire Services Medal (for Gallantry) was posthumously awarded to Albert Alexander Indoe, Chief Fire Officer HM Dockyard, Gibraltar. Two dock workers, among them Jose Moss, and two traders on nearby Ragged Staff Road were killed by flying debris. One firefighter was injured. Dock overseer Salvador Bula was injured by the explosion but managed to get others who were injured to safety. Hundreds were injured and had to be taken to the Royal Naval Hospital Gibraltar, then known as the British Military Hospital Gibraltar.

The crew of the Bedenham had already abandoned the ship by the time of the explosion, with the exception of the Captain and the Naval Armament Supply Officer, both of whom were blown into the water but subsequently rescued.

== Effect of the explosion ==
In addition to the human casualties, many of Gibraltar's buildings suffered substantial damage in the explosion, including the Cathedral of St. Mary the Crowned, the Cathedral of the Holy Trinity, and the Convent (the official residence of the governor of Gibraltar). It was locally recognized that the damage to the town would have been much worse but for the City of Gibraltar's fortress defensive walls, built between the 16th and 19th centuries, which deflected part of the explosion's blast. Another effect of the explosion was to delay the programme of housing necessary for the Gibraltarians who had been repatriated following their evacuation during World War II.

The British Admiralty accepted full responsibility for the damage, and approximately £250,000 in Gibraltar pounds was paid out in indemnity. The remains of the Bedenham were towed from Gibraltar to the Tyne by the tug Saucy on 31 May 1952, whereupon they were scrapped.

== In popular culture ==
In the 1953 movie The Clue of the Missing Ape—which was filmed in Gibraltar and produced by the Gaumont Specialised Film Unit—one of the characters, Pilar Ellis (played by Nati Banda), makes an unreferenced remark that "her mother was killed in an explosion at the docks".

== See also ==
- List of accidents and incidents involving transport or storage of ammunition
