= Autovía CA-34 =

Motorway in Spain

Autovía CA-34

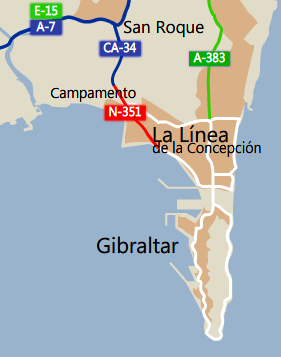

Route information
- Length: 3 km (1.9 mi)

Major junctions
- From: San Roque
- To: Campamento

Location
- Country: Spain

Highway system
- Highways in Spain; Autopistas and autovías; National Roads

The Autovía CA-34 is an autovía in the province of Cádiz, Andalusia, Spain, providing a link between the Autovía A-7 and Gibraltar. It runs for 3 km (2 miles) between the A-7 at San Roque and the village of Campamento. Thereafter, it continues for a further 4 km (2.5 miles) as a national road, the N-351, through Campamento and along the west side of La Línea de la Concepción to the checkpoint at the border with Gibraltar. Once pass checkpoint vehicles enter Gibraltar onto Winston Churchill Avenue.
