= Royal Naval Hospital Gibraltar =

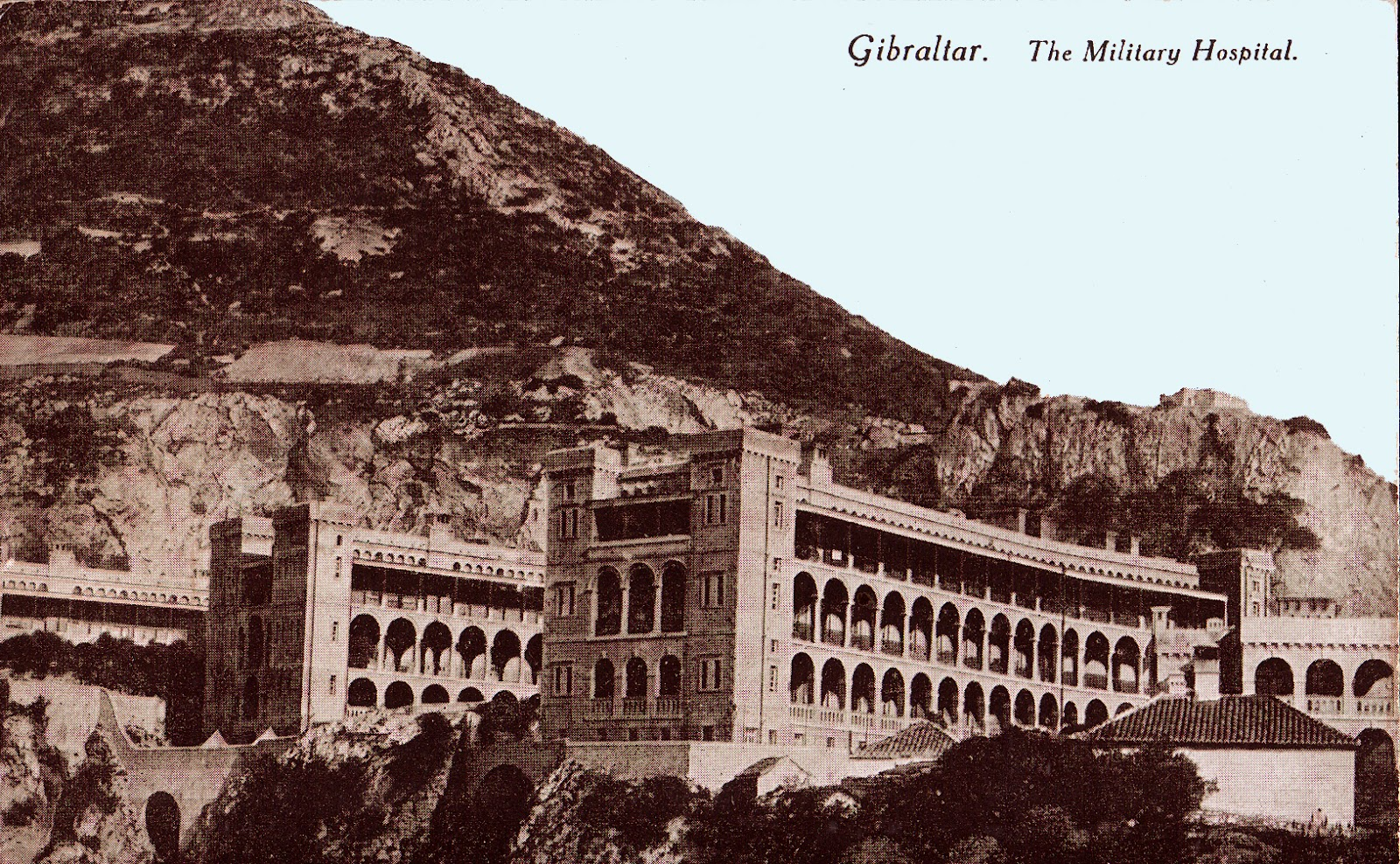
- British Military Hospital Gibraltar as depicted in a postcard c. 1910.

- Location of Royal Naval Hospital Gibraltar on Europa Road in Gibraltar's South District.

Geography
- Location: Europa Road, Gibraltar
- Coordinates: 36.11946°N 5.347762°W

Organisation
- Care system: British Armed Forces
- Type: Military

Helipads
- Helipad: No

History
- Founded: c. 1903
- Closed: February 2008

The Royal Naval Hospital Gibraltar (RNH Gibraltar), formerly the British Military Hospital Gibraltar (BMH Gibraltar), was a military hospital founded c. 1903 to provide healthcare for British military personnel and local sailors. The facility, located on Europa Road in the British Overseas Territory of Gibraltar's South District, comprised three buildings. The hospital was transferred to the Royal Navy in 1963. It closed in 2008, and underwent residential conversion that began prior to the hospital's closure.

== History ==
=== British Military Hospital ===
The British Military Hospital Gibraltar opened c. 1903 to provide medical care for local sailors and British military personnel in Gibraltar. It was located on Europa Road in the British Overseas Territory of Gibraltar at the southern end of the Iberian Peninsula. It included three three-story buildings, with a capacity of about three hundred beds. The light blue colour of its exterior gave the hospital its nickname, the Wedgwood Castle. Visitors to the hospital included Queen Alexandra in 1905 and King George V in 1912.

During 1915 there was a continuous stream of Australian, British and New Zealander wounded who arrived in Gibraltar, via hospital ship, from Gallipoli. Many of the wounded were carried on stretchers onto the Rock by the Gibraltar Volunteer corps but there were far too many to fit in the hospital. Satellite hospitals were created as the only other choice was a long sea voyage.

The British Military Hospital cared for casualties of the Spanish Civil War (1936-1939). Among the casualties were 55 men from the German cruiser Deutschland which had been bombed while at anchor off the Spanish island of Ibiza. The hospital had already been at capacity due to casualties from HMS Hunter (H35), a Royal Navy ship that had hit a mine while on patrol near Almería in May 1937. At the same time, staff were tending to casualties from HM Maine, a hospital ship. Many of the casualties had sustained burn injuries. The influx of casualties was such that four nurses from Queen Alexandra's Imperial Military Nursing Service arrived at Gibraltar by flying boat to assist in the care of the German casualties. The following year, one of those nurses was awarded the German Red Cross Decoration, as well as a certificate from Adolf Hitler.

During World War II, casualties from the Malta area were treated at BMH Gibraltar while their ships were serviced at the Naval dockyard. Injuries were again most commonly burns. During the course of WWII, a second hospital, Gort's Hospital, was built in Gibraltar, in tunnel systems deep within The Rock. There was concern that BMH Gibraltar could be compromised by an air raid or an invasion through Spain. Teams of British and Canadian engineers prepared the tunnels and St. Michael's Cave, and filled it with beds and medical equipment, even flush toilets and an operating theatre. The operating room was said to have been better than that at the conventional hospital as it had been equipped by the United States. Other underground Hospitals were Gort's Hospital (opposite the BMH) Fordham's Hospital, Monkey's Cave Convalescent Hospital and Flat Bastion Road Hospital. The rubble stone from tunneling was utilised to construct an airstrip into the Bay of Gibraltar.

=== Royal Naval Hospital ===
The hospital was transferred to the Royal Navy on 1 April 1963, and was renamed the Royal Naval Hospital Gibraltar. In recent decades, however, the Royal Navy presence in Gibraltar waned. Conversion of portions of the hospital to apartments was underway by 2006. By 2007, the capacity was down to 25 beds. However, in February of that year, the Royal Naval Hospital Gibraltar became the first military hospital to receive the Baby Friendly Award from UNICEF (United Nations Children's Fund). The Baby Friendly Hospital Initiative was established by UNICEF and the World Health Organization (WHO) to increase breastfeeding rates. The Governor of Gibraltar, Sir Robert Fulton, presented the award at the Garrison Library.

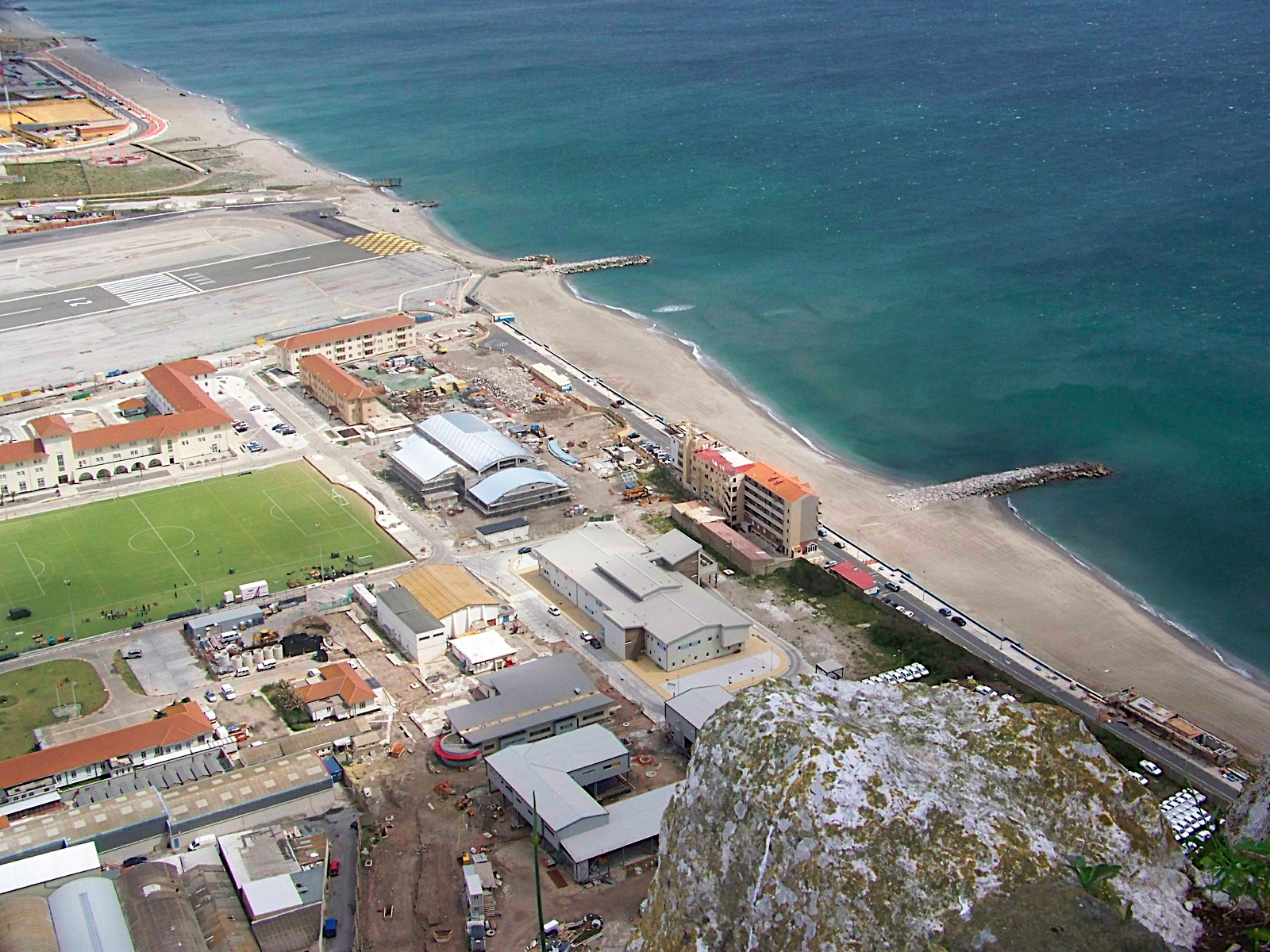
The Princess Royal Medical Centre within the Devil's Tower Camp complex just off Eastern Beach.

During its last full year of operation, 2007, the hospital received permission to fly the White Ensign for several months, instead of the traditional Union Flag. After more than one hundred years of service, the gates of the hospital were closed in 2008 by ABMA Kirsty Taylor, the youngest serving member of staff at that time. It was one of the last existing Royal Naval Hospitals. The move to new premises took place over a two-week period in February 2008, with the hospital remaining open during the process of relocation. The new facility was the Princess Royal Medical Centre, within the Royal Gibraltar Regiment's Devil's Tower Camp. The new medical centre was inaugurated the following year on 5 March 2009 by Anne, Princess Royal.

The phased residential conversion of the Royal Naval Hospital Gibraltar has been named The Cliftons, taking its name from two areas: Clifton, in Bristol, England, and Clifton Beach in Cape Town, South Africa. Block A of the hospital was renovated by Profield Contractors and the MSMR architectural firm for Taylor Woodrow while the hospital was still in operation. That first phase of hospital conversion was named Orchid House and includes eleven luxury apartments. A floor was added to the original building to enable construction of two penthouses. In addition, three new townhouses and a villa were built and named Clifton Mews. The Government of Gibraltar has applied for European Heritage Site status for the hospital. The process of conversion of the former hospital to apartments is expected to continue.

=== Military care of the barbary macaques ===
Gibraltar's barbary macaque population was under the care of the British Army and later the Gibraltar Regiment from 1915 to 1991, who carefully controlled a population that initially consisted of a single troop. An officer was appointed to supervise their welfare, and a food allowance of fruit, vegetables and nuts was included in the budget. Births were gazetted in military fashion, and each new arrival was named. They were named after governors, brigadiers and high-ranking officers. Any ill or injured monkey needing surgery or any other form of medical attention was taken to Royal Naval Hospital Gibraltar and received the same treatment as would an enlisted service man. Following the withdrawal of the British garrison, the Government of Gibraltar took over responsibility for the monkeys.
