= Devil's Tower Camp =

Military installation in Gilbraltar

- Devil's Tower Road, Gibraltar
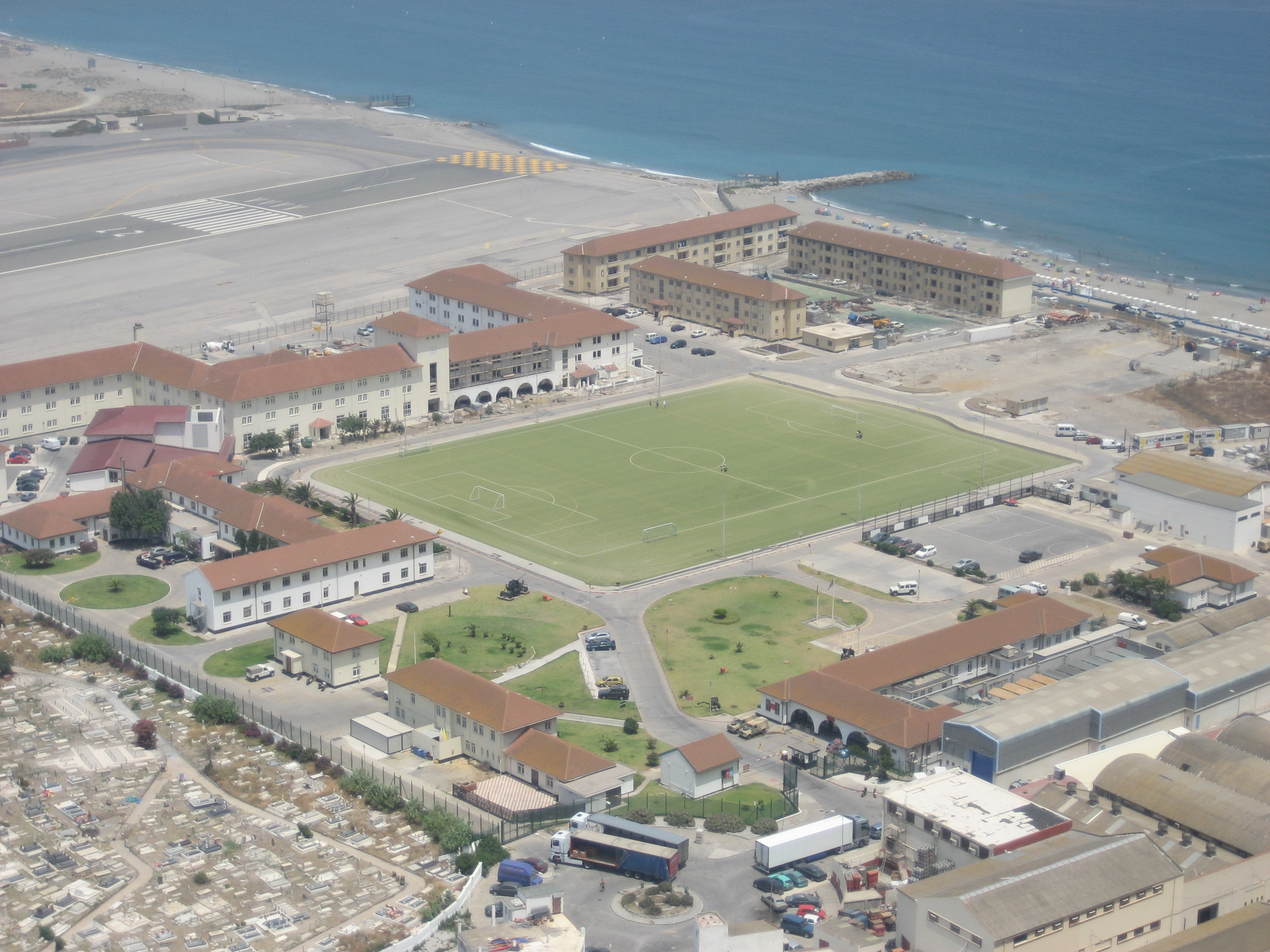
- Devil's Tower Camp

Site information
- Type: Barracks
- Owner: Government of Gibraltar

Location
- Original location of Devil's Tower within Gibraltar.
- Location within Gibraltar Location within Europe
- Coordinates: 36.14877°N 5.34174°W

Site history
- Built: 1942
- Built for: War Office
- In use: 1942-present

Garrison information
- Occupants: Royal Gibraltar Regiment

Devil's Tower Camp is a military installation located just south-east of Gibraltar International Airport on the isthmus between Spain and Gibraltar.

== History ==
The site dates back to 1713 when Spain ceded land to the United Kingdom under the Treaty of Utrecht. The camp was established in 1942 as an RAF barracks to support RAF Gibraltar during the Second World War and was located conveniently close to the airfield.

The facilities, which were increasingly used by the British Army after the War, became the home of the Royal Gibraltar Regiment. They were expanded and refurbished to provide a new catering complex and single living accommodation for some 450 troops in 2009. The new facilities also included the Princess Royal Medical Centre, established to provide medical facilities for military personnel, which was opened by the Princess Royal during that year.

In 2011 Government of Gibraltar and the UK Ministry of Defence agreed that the UK's property requirements would be filled by the Naval Base, the Airfield, Devil's Tower Camp and Four Corners so releasing extensive other property for disposal.

In 2021, the field at Devil's Tower Camp was used as a football pitch to host matches in the 2020–21 Gibraltar Women's Football League, while resurfacing took place at Victoria Stadium.
