= Winston Churchill Avenue, Gibraltar =

Road in Gibraltar

Coordinates: 36.1505°N 5.3488°W

Winston Churchill Avenue
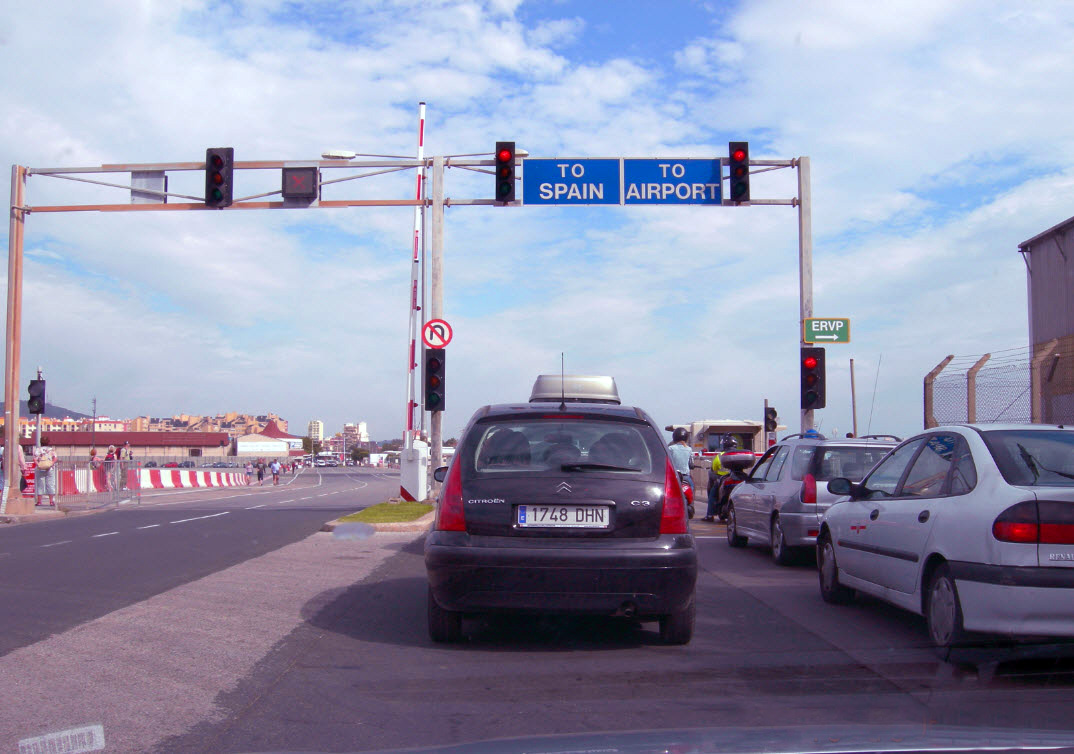
- Security barrier at the former intersection of Gibraltar Airport runway and Winston Churchill Avenue (looking north)
- Interactive map of Winston Churchill Avenue
- Length: 1.5 km (0.93 mi)
- Location: Gibraltar

Winston Churchill Avenue is an arterial road in the British overseas territory of Gibraltar, connecting it with Spain. Once the customs are crossed, the avenue becomes the dual carriageway (Spanish: Autovía) CA-34 (former national road N-351).

== Description ==
The northern end of the road starts at Gibraltar's border with Spain and is bifurcated by Gibraltar International Airport at Victoria Stadium, which is Gibraltar's major sporting venue. The road intersects the airport's runway at surface level; movable barricades close when aircraft land or take off.

In 2009, the Government of Gibraltar announced that a new highway would be built in order to avoid motor vehicles crossing the runway, which caused congestion. On 31 March 2023, the new road, a dual carriageway named The Kingsway linked the customs checkpoint with Devil's Tower Road, crossing the east end of the airport runway underground, through a 350-metre tunnel.

Runway access is now closed to everyday road traffic but is still available for exceptional, specific, or emergency use, as well as for pedestrians, cyclists and mobility scooters, although an alternative subway is provided.

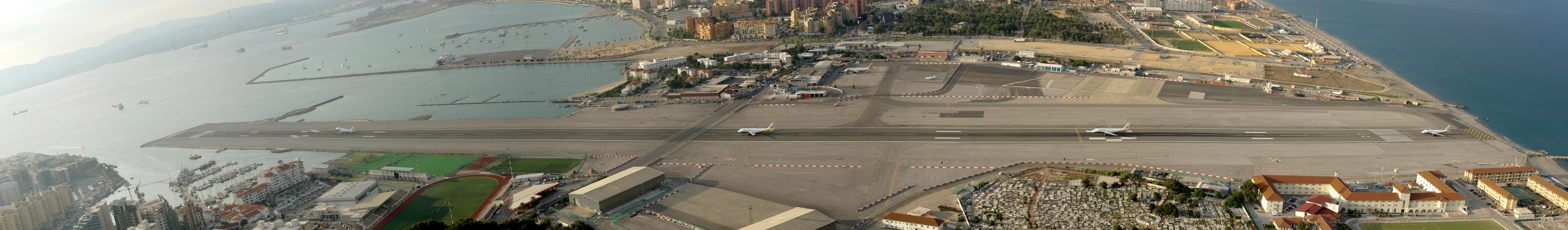
A time-lapse photomontage showing multiple stages of a Monarch Airlines Airbus A320 aircraft taking off (moving right-to-left) from Gibraltar Airport, located at the northern end of Gibraltar. Also visible in the centre is Winston Churchill Avenue. As can be seen, the road intersects the airport runway, so consequently it has to be closed every time a plane lands or departs.
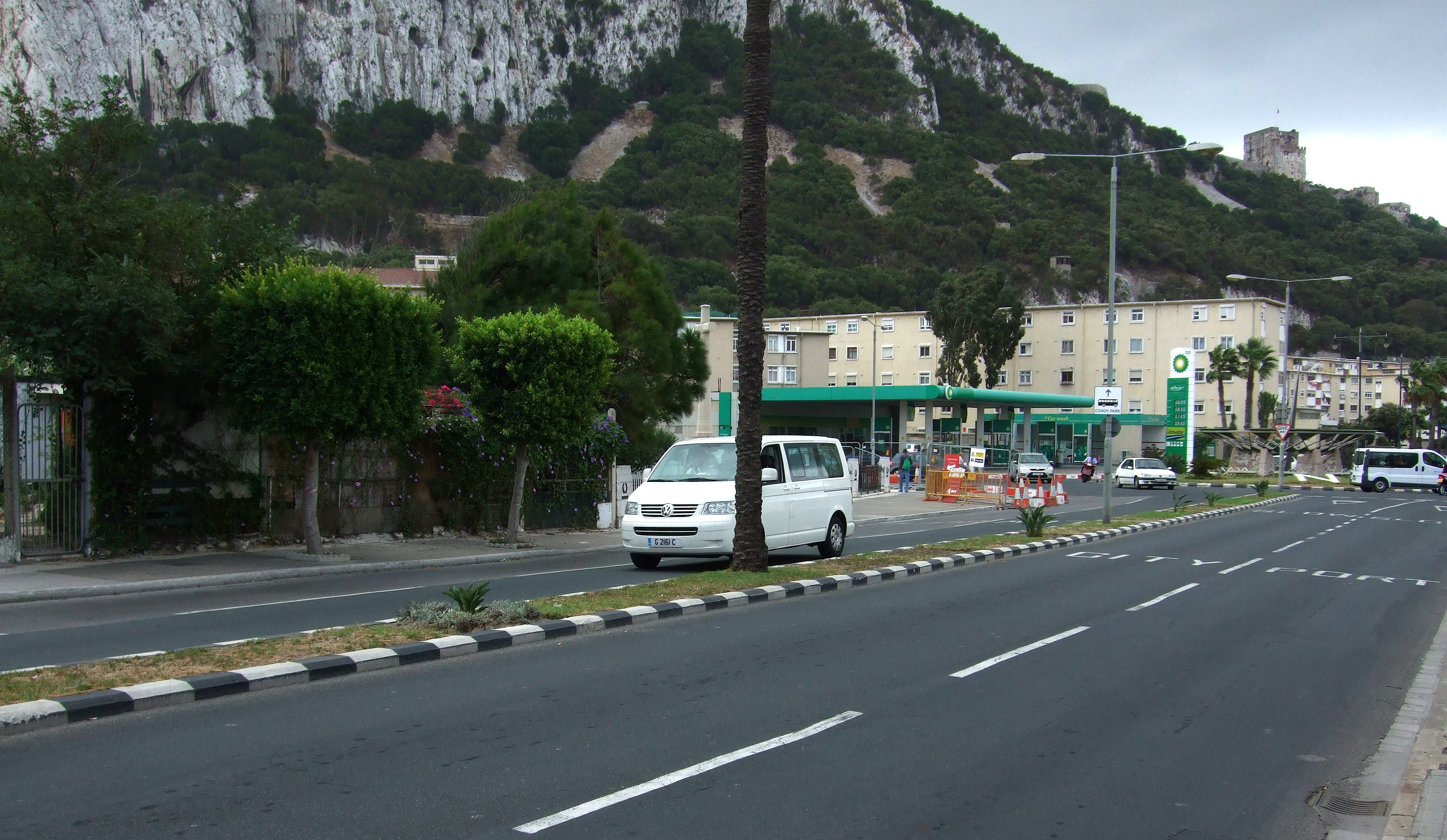

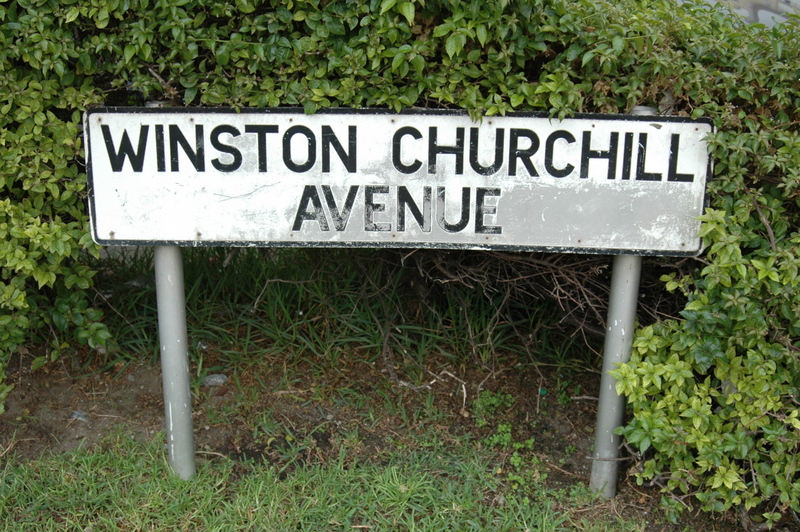

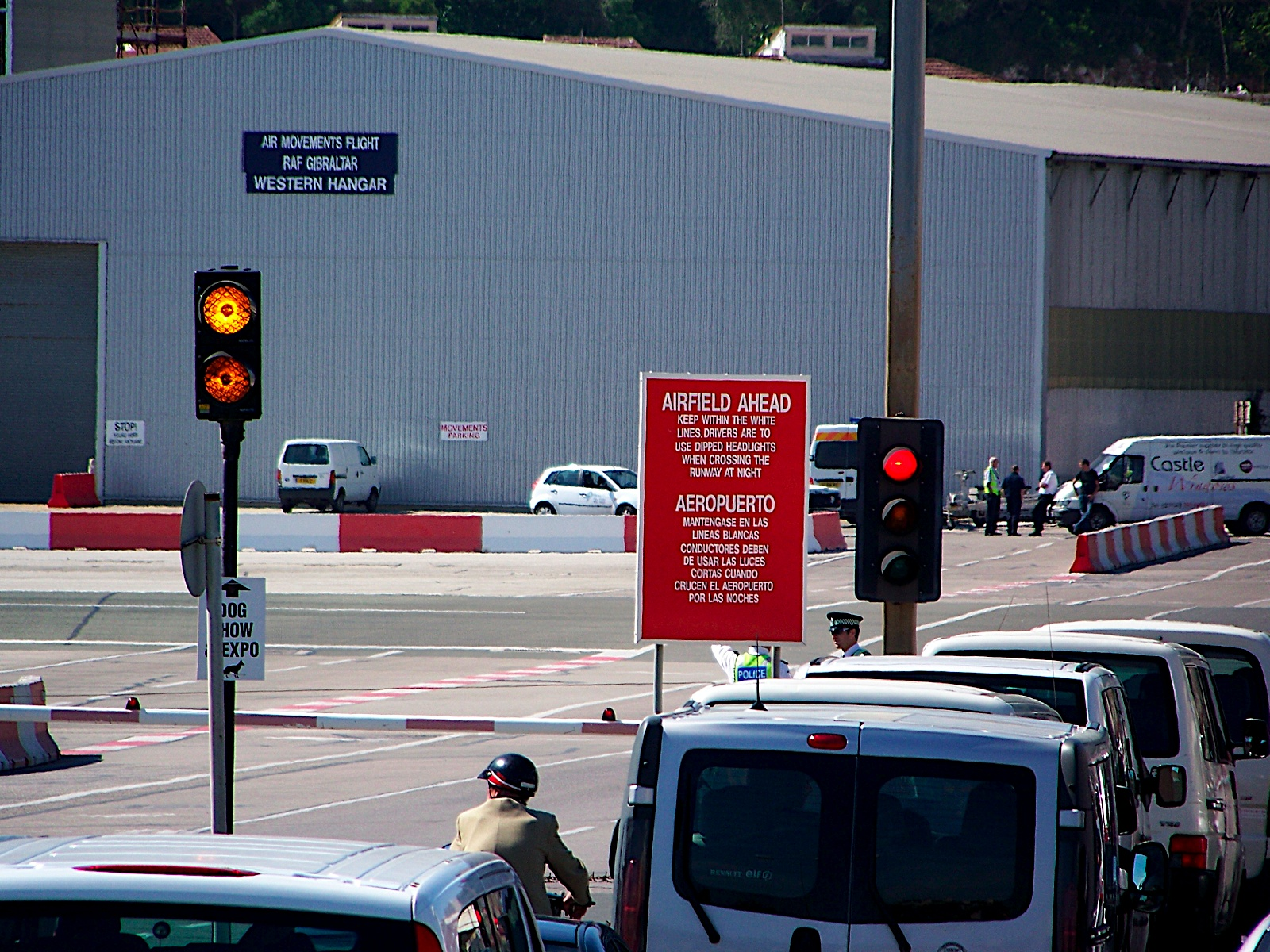

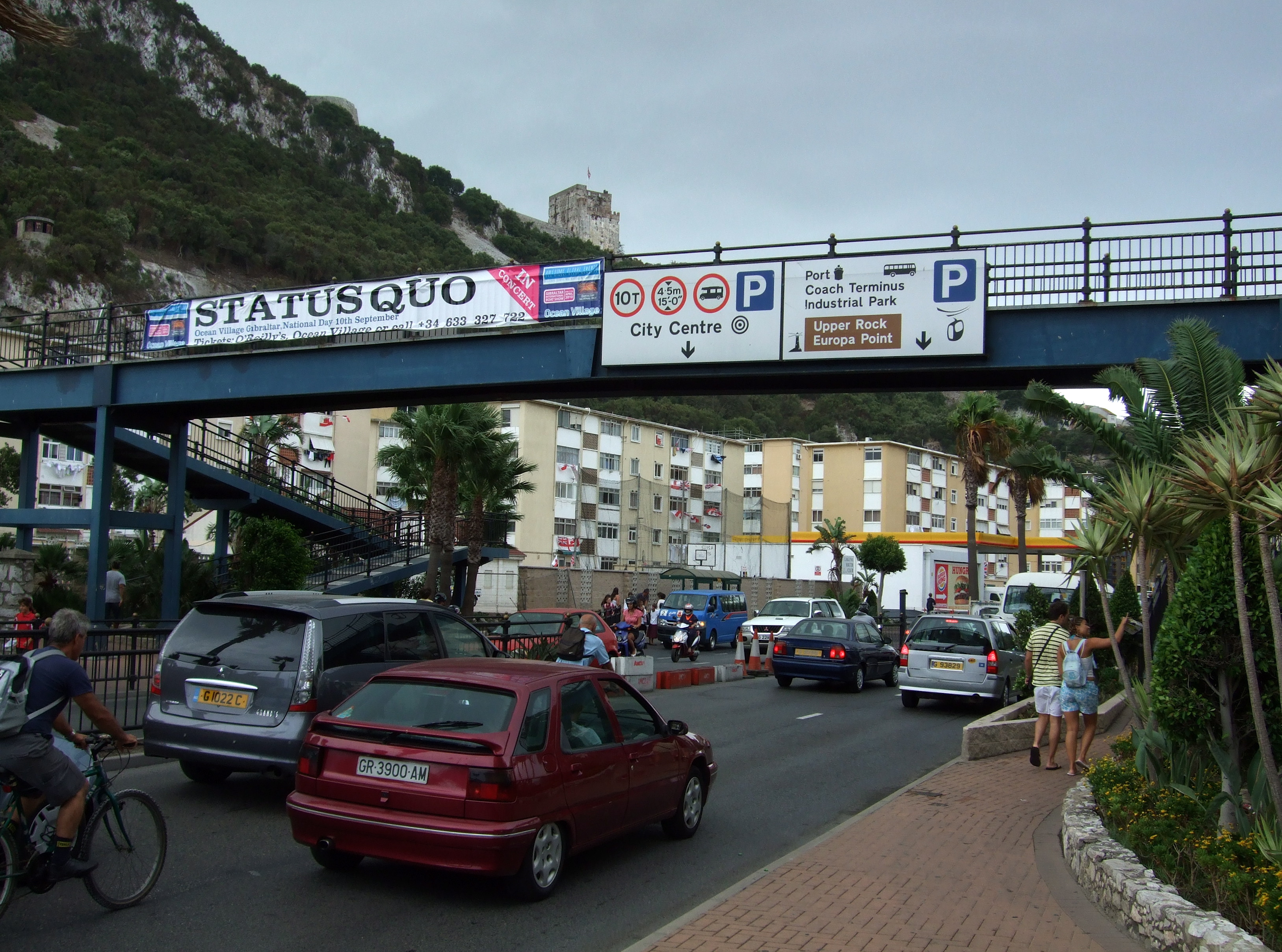

== Operation Flavius ==
In 1988, the then-Shell petrol station located on the road was the scene of a controversial British military operation known as Operation Flavius. On 6 March, a Special Air Service (SAS) group shot dead three members of a Provisional Irish Republican Army (IRA) team, made up of Danny McCann, Seán Savage and Mairéad Farrell while they were making their way to Spain on foot. The three were suspected of planning to kill members of a British military band with a car bomb outside the Governor of Gibraltar's official residence, The Convent. At the subsequent inquest into the deaths, members of the SAS team stated that they believed that the three were armed and that they were capable of remotely detonating the suspected bomb. The legality of the deaths was challenged in the European Court of Human Rights (see McCann and Others v United Kingdom), but it was eventually ruled that the killings were lawful.
