= Gibraltar International Airport =

Airport in Gibraltar

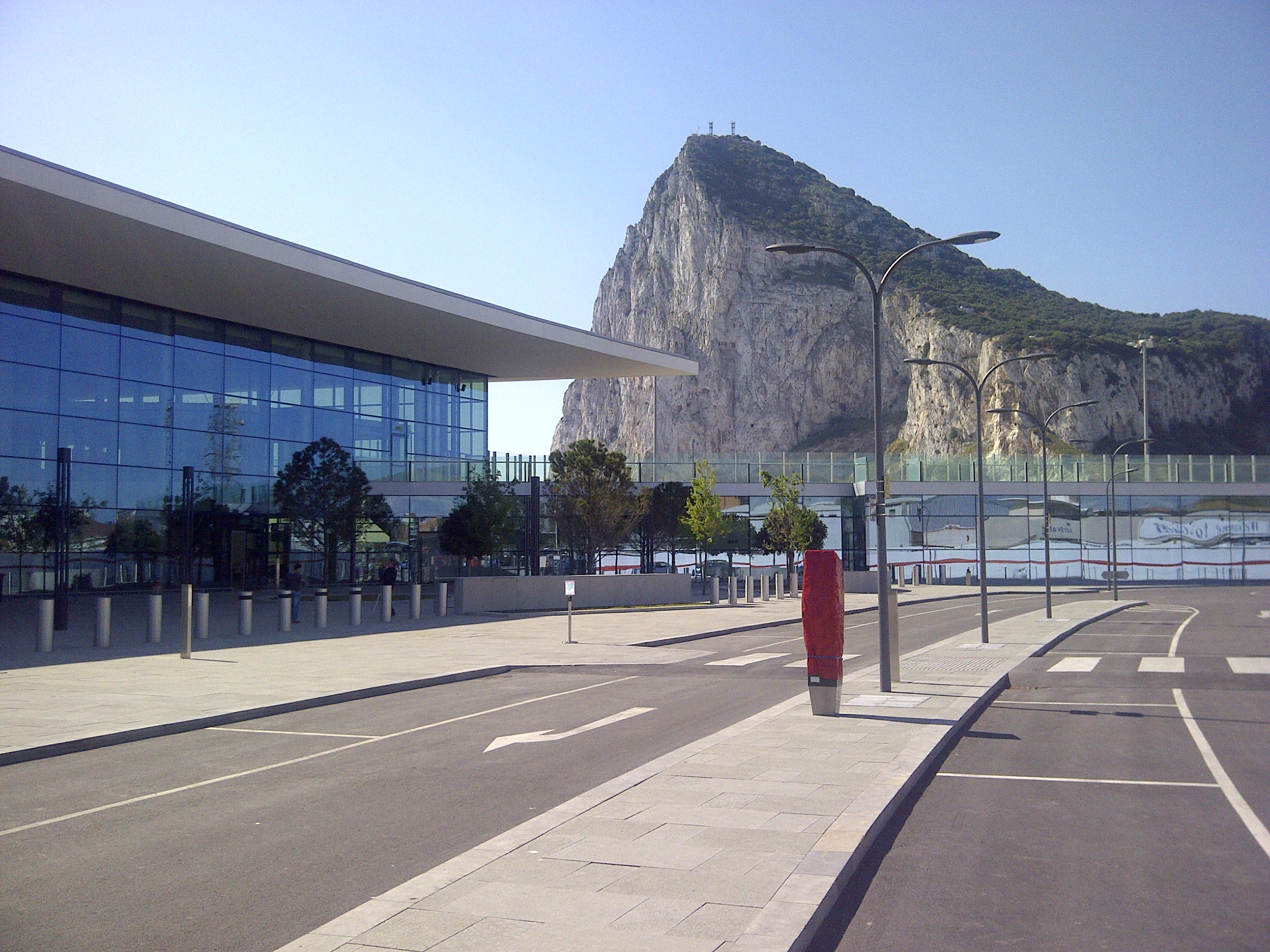
- New passenger terminal, with Rock of Gibraltar behind it
- IATA: GIB; ICAO: LXGB

Summary
- Airport type: Military / public
- Owner: Ministry of Defence
- Operator: aerodrome: Royal Air Force airport terminal: Government of Gibraltar
- Serves: Gibraltar and Campo de Gibraltar
- Location: Gibraltar
- Opened: 1959; 67 years ago
- Time zone: Central European Time (+1)
  - Summer (DST): Central European Summer Time (+2)
- Elevation AMSL: 3.7 m (12 ft)
- Coordinates: 36°09′04″N 005°20′59″W
- Website: www.gibraltarairport.gi

Map
- Location of airport in Gibraltar GIB (Europe)

Runways
Direction	Length		Surface
Direction	m	ft	Surface
09/27	1,776	5,827	grooved asphalt

Statistics (2022)
- Passengers: 446,187
- Passenger change 2021–22: ▲70%
- Aircraft movements: 3,868
- Movements change 2021–22: ▲18.3%
- Sources: WAD; UK Military Aeronautical Information Publication – Gibraltar.

Gibraltar International Airport, officially Joshua Hassan Gibraltar International Airport, and previously known as North Front Airport, (IATA: GIB, ICAO: LXGB) is the civilian airport that serves the British overseas territory of Gibraltar. The runway and aerodrome is owned by the Ministry of Defence (MoD), and operated by the Royal Air Force (RAF) as RAF Gibraltar. Civilian operators use the civilian-operated terminal. National Air Traffic Services (NATS) hold the contract for provision of air navigation services at the airport.

In 2024, the civilian airport handled 424,386 passengers and 97,697 kilograms (215,385 pounds) of cargo on 3,628 total flights. Winston Churchill Avenue (the main road heading towards the land border with Spain) intersects the airport runway, and in the past had to be closed for aircraft movements. Since March 2023 there is a tunnel which allows traffic to flow whilst aircraft are landing or taking off. However the tunnel does not run under the runway. Pedestrians can still cross the runway when the road is open, which offers a shorter route than via the tunnel. The History Channel programme Most Extreme Airports ranked the airport the fifth most extreme airport in the world, ahead of the now-defunct Kai Tak Airport with its infamous right-hand turn approach over central Hong Kong before landing, but behind Princess Juliana International Airport, famous for its low-altitude approaches over a public beach. It is exposed to strong cross winds around the 'rock' and across the Bay of Gibraltar, making landings in winter particularly challenging.

Prior to its bankruptcy, Monarch Airlines was the largest operator at Gibraltar, but it entered administration and ceased operations in October 2017. As of 2021 easyJet is the largest airline operator, with the airport also being served by British Airways.

Although located in Gibraltar, the airport is also used by people travelling to or from neighbouring parts of southern Spain such as the Costa del Sol and the Campo de Gibraltar. The other nearby international airports are Málaga Airport, located 126 km (78 mi) north east and Seville Airport, located 203 km (126 mi) north of Gibraltar International Airport.

== History ==
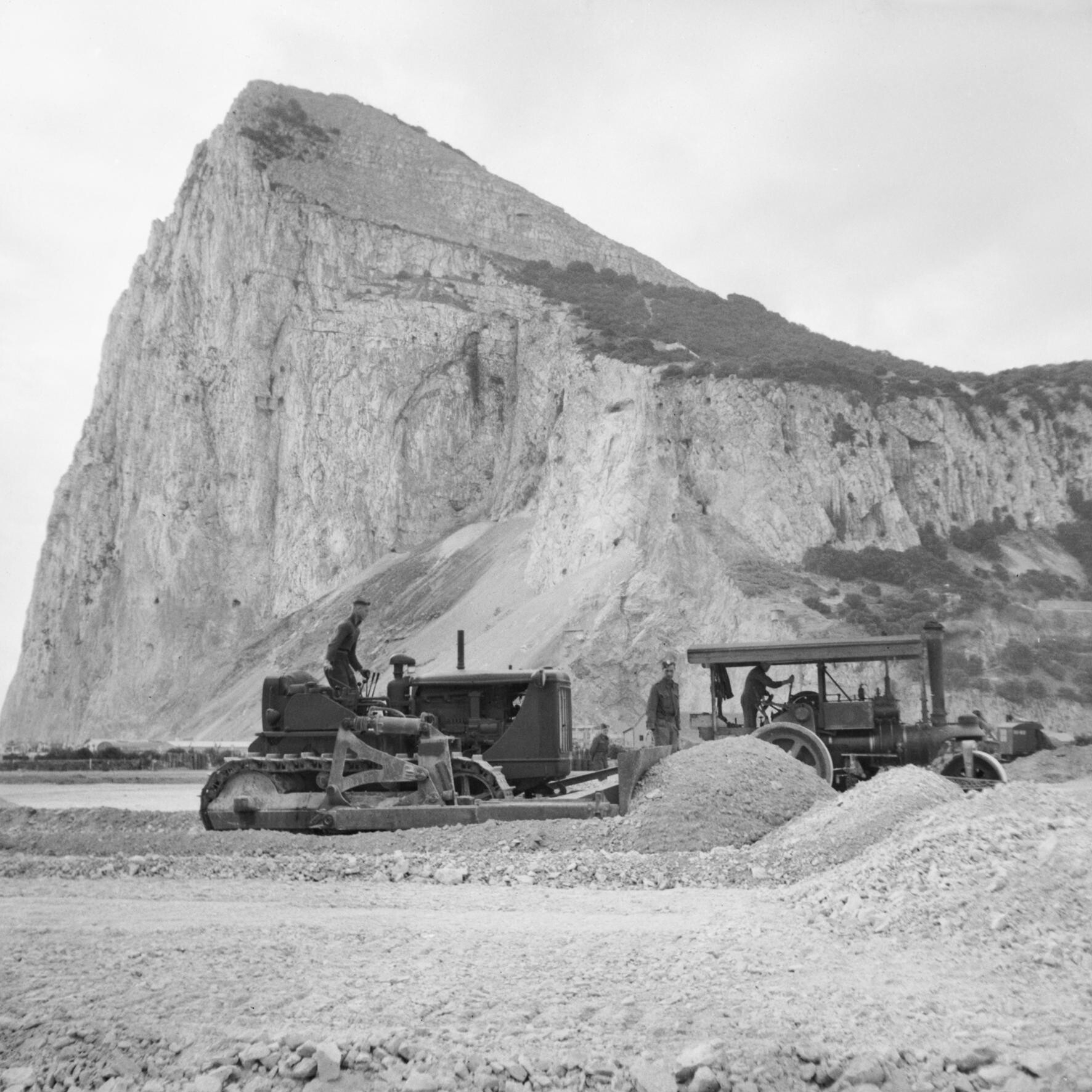
A bulldozer and steamroller being used during the construction of a new aerodrome on Gibraltar, November 1941

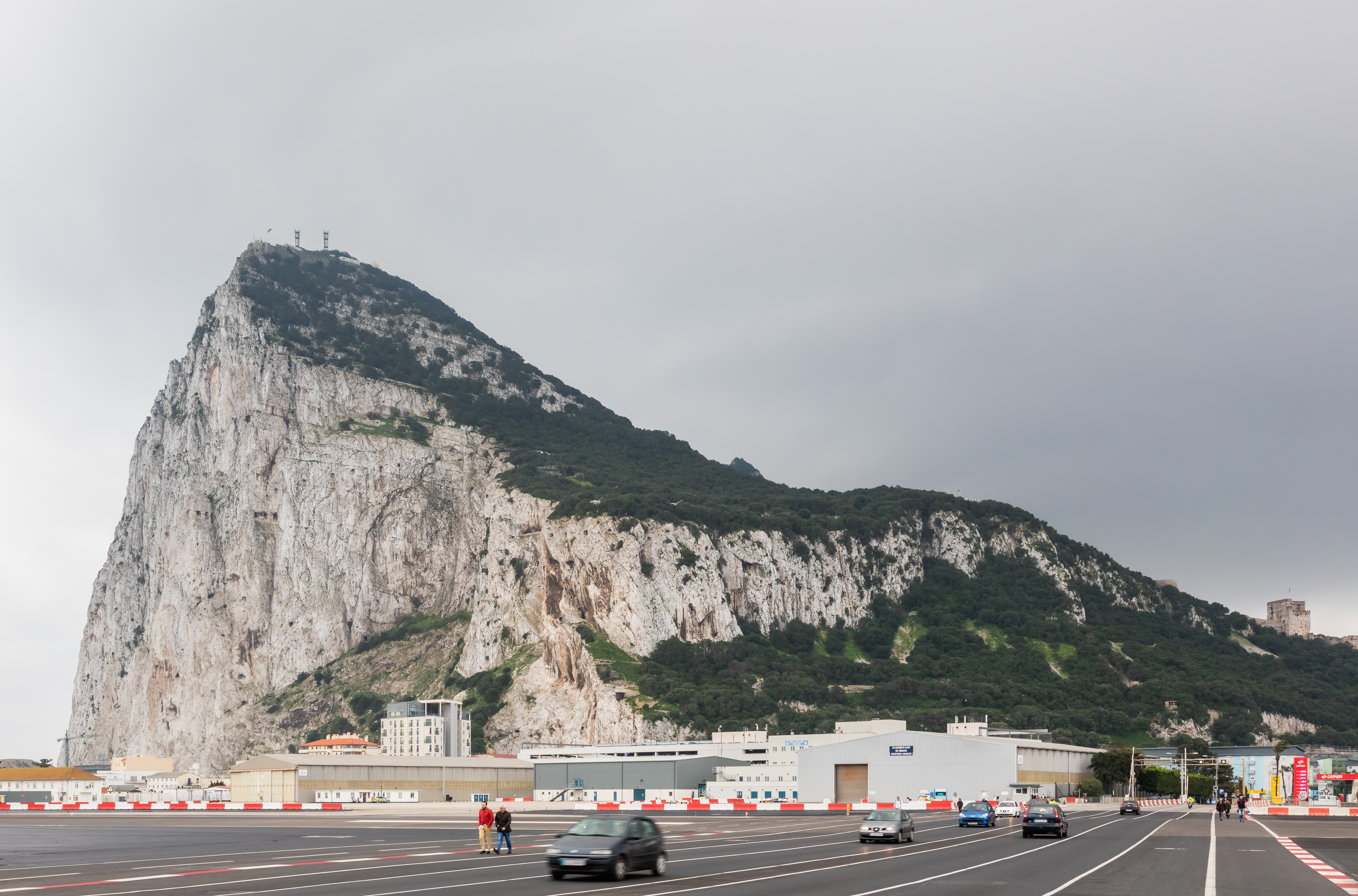
Winston Churchill Avenue crossing the runway with the rock in the background

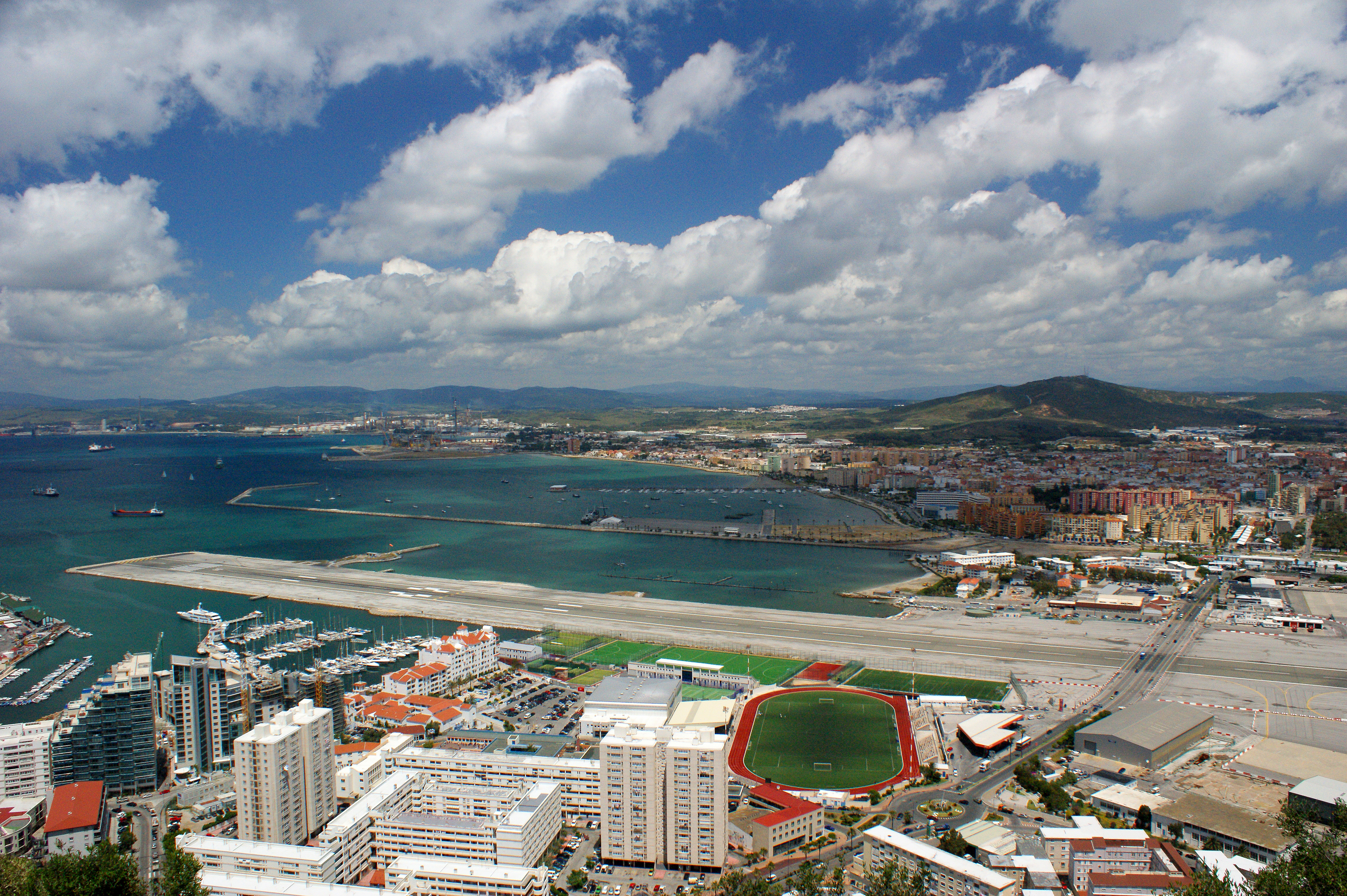
Runway overview

=== Construction ===
The first attempt of passenger air traffic from Gibraltar was made in 1931 by Gibraltar Airways Ltd, using the territory's race course on the North Frontier, however the service closed after only three and a half months. The actual airport was constructed during World War II upon the former race track, when Gibraltar was an important naval base for the British. Opened in 1936, at first it was only an emergency airfield for the Royal Navy's Fleet Air Arm (FAA). In 1940, a landing strip was made and the airfield was used by the Royal Air Force (RAF) and Fleet Air Arm, mostly for anti-U-boat patrols and convoy protection. However, the runway was extended in 1942–1943 by reclaiming some land from the Bay of Gibraltar using rock blasted from the Rock of Gibraltar while carrying out works on military tunnels. By April 1942, the runway was extended to 1,150 yards (3,450 feet; 1,050 metres), by November 1942 to 1,550 yards (4,650 feet; 1,420 metres), and by July 1943 to 1,800 yards (5,400 feet; 1,600 metres). This last major extension of the runway allowed larger aircraft to land at Gibraltar.

=== Business development 2000–2009 ===
On 3 November 2003, Monarch Airlines announced a new route from Gibraltar to Manchester Airport. It was the first route from Gibraltar to operate to the North of England. However, on 19 July 2006, Monarch withdrew the route due to the cost. On 21 April 2008, Monarch announced it would resume the services to Manchester from 12 September 2008. The route operated three to five times a week: every Monday, Wednesday and Friday in winter season, as well as on Thursdays and Sundays in the summer season.

By late 2005 and early 2006, the implementation of a new agreement was one of the main topics of the Gibraltar Trilateral Forum being held between the Governments of Gibraltar, Spain, and the United Kingdom. As a result, the Córdoba Accord was signed on 18 September 2006 by all parties. This ended all discriminatory restrictions on civilian flights to Gibraltar International, including the prohibition of flights over Spanish soil, and exclusion of Gibraltar from all EU agreements on air transport, allowing civilian flights from all nations into Gibraltar International.

On 17 November 2006, Iberia Airlines announced that it would start flights from Madrid to Gibraltar using an Airbus A319 aircraft. This was a landmark move, as no Spanish airline had flown to Gibraltar since 1979, because of its disputed status. Iberia began flights to Gibraltar International on 16 December 2006, with a flight from Madrid that included some members of the Spanish Government on board. GB Airways flew a one-off flight in the other direction with a group of children from the Gibraltar area making up the passengers. In May 2007, GB Airways (flying as a British Airways franchisee) also began operating the route between Madrid and Gibraltar, however, this was discontinued on 30 September, leaving Iberia to work the route alone. On 22 September 2008, Iberia announced that it would cease its flights to Madrid by 28 September due to "economic reasons", namely, lack of demand. This left Gibraltar, once again, without any air links with Spain.

In April 2009, Ándalus Líneas Aéreas restored Gibraltar's air link with the Spanish capital. In July 2009, Ándalus also began scheduled flights to Barcelona, increasing the destinations in Spain to two. However, the airline ceased to serve this route in September 2009 due to a lack of demand. In April 2010, it was confirmed that Ándalus flights to and from Gibraltar had been indefinitely suspended. And now yet again, Gibraltar has no direct air links to Spain. Ándalus Líneas Aéreas ceased operations on 13 August 2010.

In 2009, British Airways moved its flights from Gatwick to its main base at London Heathrow.

=== Business development 2010–2019 ===
From 2011 until October 2012, easyJet offered thrice-weekly service from Gibraltar to Liverpool, but it was eventually dropped due to easyJet repositioning aircraft from its Liverpool base to other bases, in turn causing it to drop its least profitable routes from there, such as Gibraltar, Tallinn and Brussels.

On 18 May 2011, Bmibaby announced that it would launch flights from Gibraltar to East Midlands Airport from 31 March 2012. This was the first time that an airline has operated that route. The route operated on Tuesdays, Thursdays and Saturdays, using a Boeing 737-300. However, on 3 May 2012, it was announced that Bmibaby was to be closed by the International Airlines Group after the group failed to find a buyer for the airline. Bmibaby operated its last service to Gibraltar on 8 September 2012, and the airline operated its last flight the following day.

On 10 January 2012, Gibraltar was selected as one of the 'World's Scariest Airport Landings and Take-offs' in the travel section of the Daily Telegraph due to its runway which extends into the sea.

On 14 August 2012, Monarch announced it would launch a new route to Birmingham, operating three times a week; every Tuesday, Thursday and Saturday. The route began on 23 March 2013, but changed to running on Tuesdays, Thursdays and Sundays.

In the summer of 2014, services between Gibraltar and Marrakesh were operated by Royal Air Maroc Express on behalf of a local travel company, Your Flight. However, the services, which were operated on a charter basis, and could not be booked via global distribution system channels or on a connection basis, terminated after just three months due to insufficient demand.

In November 2014, easyJet announced that it would begin a new route to Bristol Airport which commenced on 19 April 2015.

Royal Air Maroc (RAM) announced in November 2014 that after many years, it would restore the short intercontinental air connection between Gibraltar and Tangier in March 2015 on a twice weekly basis. Unlike the previous Marrakesh flights, these would be operated by RAM for themselves, and offer connecting flights to their Casablanca hub and onwards, and be available via normal sales channels.

Overnight work to resurface the runway started on the evening of 4 September 2015, and the work was completed in January 2016.

In November 2015, easyJet announced that it would begin a new route to Manchester Airport twice weekly, making this the first time two airlines have competed against each other on the Manchester-Gibraltar route. The new route commenced on 3 July 2016. During the same month, Monarch announced a new route from Gibraltar to London Gatwick, beginning on 1 May running four times a week.

On 2 October 2017, the Civil Aviation Authority (CAA) confirmed that Monarch Airlines had ceased operations with immediate effect and had entered administration. All flights were cancelled. Monarch operated about a third of the airports movements prior to shutting down.

On 12 July 2018, easyJet announced a twice-weekly new route to London-Luton, restoring the link between the two airports. The restored route started in December 2018.

On 11 December 2019, easyJet announced a new twice-weekly service to Edinburgh, making it the first time that Gibraltar had a direct link to Scotland. The route was due to start in March 2020, but was delayed until 5 June 2021 by the COVID-19 pandemic. EasyJet resumed services from Manchester on 20 July, Gatwick on 25 July, and Bristol on 4 August. The airline's service to Luton was axed as a result of the pandemic, and from increased competition by Wizz Air who began serving the route in December 2020.

=== Business development since 2020 ===
In October 2020, Hélity announced a new route to Málaga beginning 30 October, with flights operating three times a week on Monday, Wednesday and Friday. The service ceased in November due to Covid restrictions.

On 4 February 2021, Eastern Airways announced two new routes to Southampton and Birmingham from 24 and 28 May. This marked the first time that Eastern Airways were to operate scheduled flights from the airport, as well as the first ever route to Southampton and the resumption of the Birmingham service that was lost after Monarch's collapse in October 2017. Both routes ceased in 2022.

June 2021 saw a new EasyJet route to Edinburgh. Other EasyJet routes being London Gatwick, London Luton, Manchester and Bristol.

2023 saw EasyJet flying to London Gatwick, Manchester and Bristol.

In July 2026, the government of Gibraltar renamed the airport "Joshua Hassan Gibraltar International Airport" in honour of Gibraltar's first-ever mayor Joshua Hassan. In the same month, as a result of a post-Brexit treaty between the European Union and the United Kingdom, Spain began to implement Schengen Area controls at the airport within a new facility that is partially constructed within Spanish territory. Minister for Tourism Christian Santos said airlines have shown interest over potential new routes between Gibraltar and Spain, France, the Netherlands and other European Union destinations, with new flights expected to begin in summer 2027, and the treaty has changed the airport's catchment area from the local population of 38,000 to 4 million people.

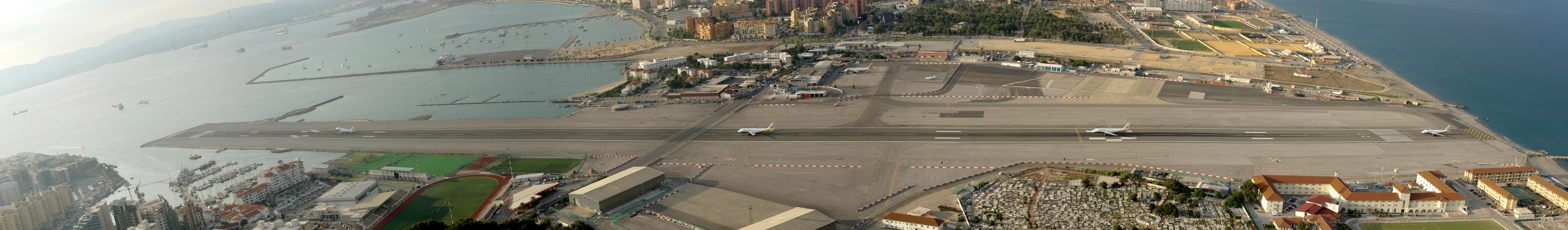
Panoramic photograph of Gibraltar International Airport in 2007, with time-lapse showing an aircraft taking off

== Disputes regarding territory's status ==
The airport is located on the isthmus that connects Gibraltar with the rest of the Iberian Peninsula, and thus the country of Spain. Whether or not the airport's territory was ceded by the Treaty of Utrecht is disputed by Spain and the United Kingdom. In the spring of 1815, Spain claims an epidemic of yellow fever struck Gibraltar, so that the British authorities built several barracks as field isolation in the neutral zone. On 20 April 1815, the Lt. Governor of Gibraltar, George Don, agreed with the general commander of the Campo de Gibraltar, General Don José María de Alós, that "a large proportion of the inhabitants [of Gibraltar] to [..] not [have] they suffered fever, temporarily established on the neutral ground, as close as circumstances permit, in front of this fortress".

Spain's continuing sovereignty dispute with the United Kingdom over the territory on which the airport stands (different from the generic one on Gibraltar itself) has seriously affected the airport's operations. On 2 December 1987, an agreement was signed between the governments of the United Kingdom and Spain to allow the joint civil use of the airport. The agreement foresaw the building of a new terminal in the neighbouring Spanish municipality of La Línea de la Concepción adjacent to the northern side of the existing frontier. However, the agreement was blocked by the Government of Gibraltar, led from 1988 by Joe Bossano. As a result, the agreement was never implemented.

Since then, Spain successfully excluded Gibraltar from European-wide de-regulation initiatives, such as the Single European Sky programme, preventing direct links from Gibraltar to the European Union (EU), on the grounds that regulation would recognises the sovereignty of the Gibraltar government (and by extension the UK) over the disputed land border.

In July 2026, as a result of a post-Brexit treaty between the European Union and the United Kingdom, Spain began to implement Schengen Area controls at the airport within a new facility that is partially constructed within Spanish territory.

== Terminals ==
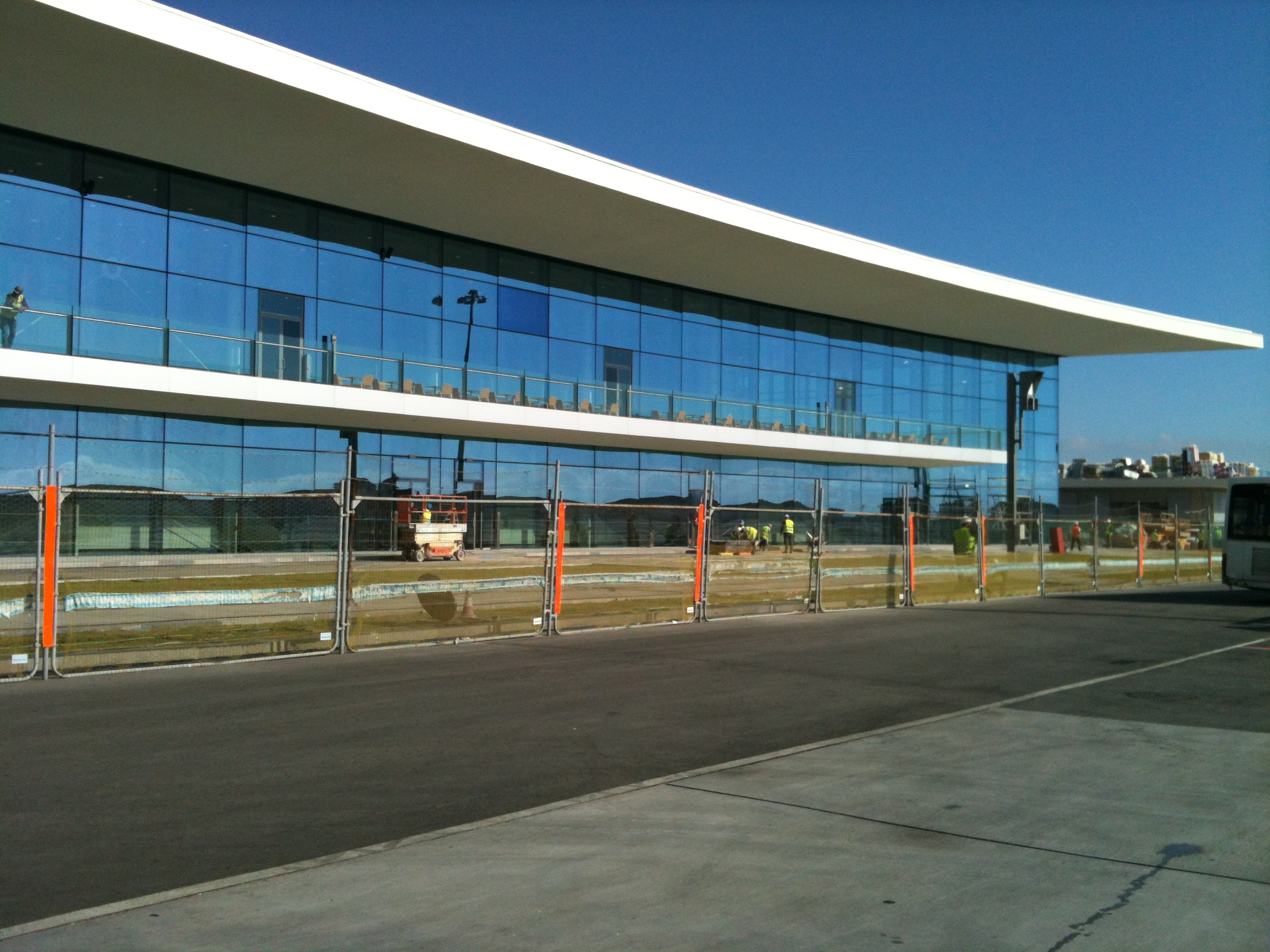
New airport civilian passenger terminal nearing completion in 2011

There is one passenger terminal at Gibraltar International.

=== Old terminal ===
The original terminal at the airport was built in 1959, and refurbished in the late 1990s. For many years, it had been too small to cope with the number of passengers when two flights were scheduled to arrive or depart within a short space of time. The size of the terminal was 20,000 square metres (220,000 square feet), and it had ten check-in desks, one baggage carousel, one security gate, and two departure gates. On 26 November 2011, arriving flights switched to the new terminal as the first phase opened. On 25 September 2012, the old terminal closed its doors. The last flight to use it was easyJet flight EZY8904 to London-Gatwick. The old terminal building was demolished in February 2014.

=== New terminal ===
A new terminal was constructed at Gibraltar International due to increasing numbers of passengers. Planning permission was announced in 2007, with construction of the new terminal beginning in 2009 and completed in 2011. The first phase of the new terminal opened on 26 November 2011 for arriving flights only. The second phase of the new terminal opened on 26 September 2012 when flight departures moved. The first flight to use the first phase was easyJet flight EZY7295 from Liverpool, and the first flight to use the second phase was British Airways flight BA491 to London Heathrow. The terminal's terrace was inaugurated by the Earl of Wessex, Prince Edward on 13 June 2012.

This new terminal is 35,000 square metres (380,000 square feet), which is 15,000 square metres (160,000 square feet) larger than the old terminal. It has two baggage carousels and three departure gates, none of which are equipped with jet bridges. It has a capacity of up to 1.5 million passengers per year. Retail services are also available in the terminal, and these include WH Smith, 36 North Bar, and Gibraltar Duty Free Stores. A new general aviation area has also been built inside the terminal to handle private aircraft.

== Expansion ==
=== New road access (Kingsway) ===
==== Background ====
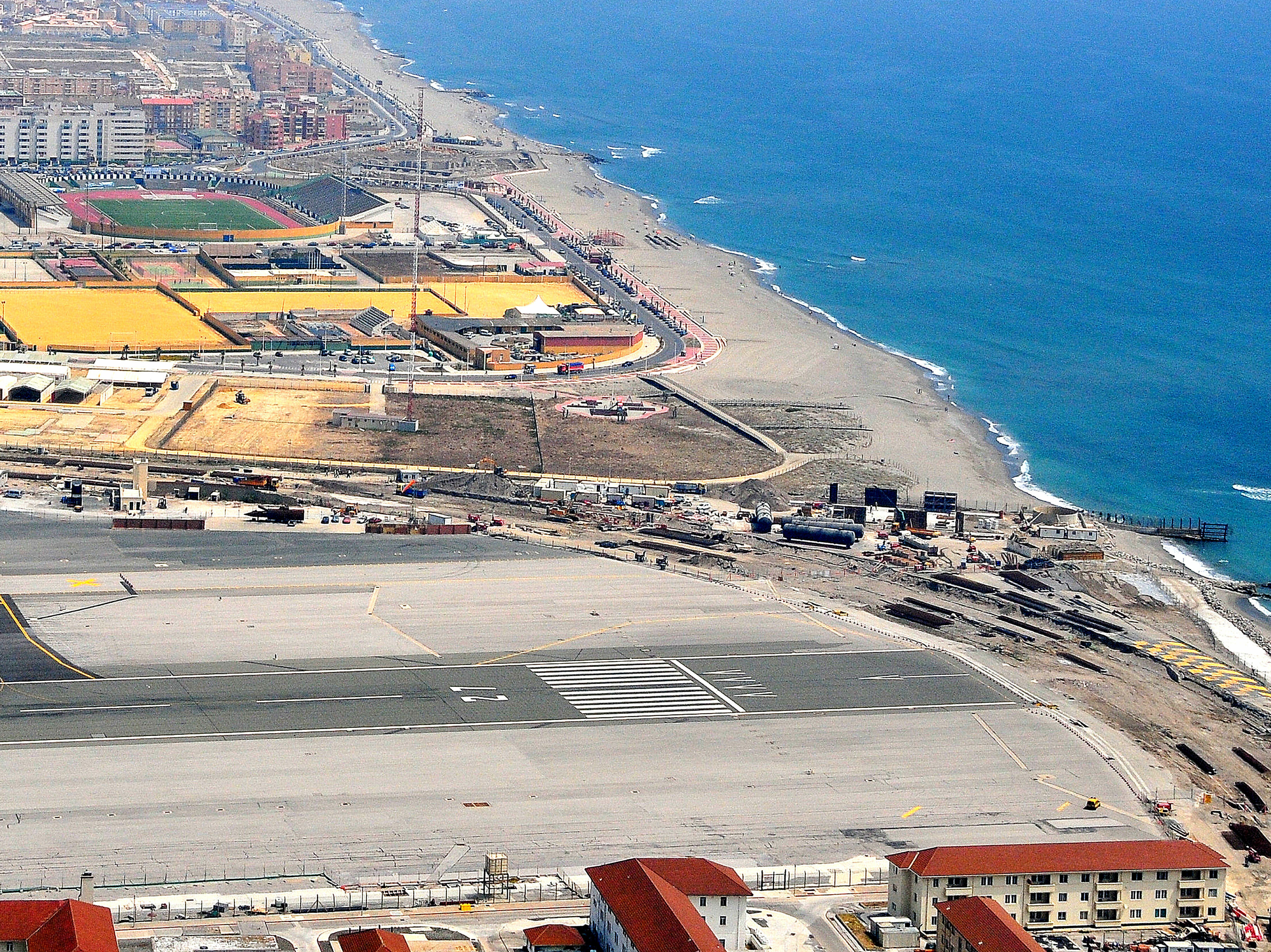
Kingsway tunnel under construction in 2018

Since the construction of the airport runway across it in the 1940s, Winston Churchill Avenue – the main road in and out of Gibraltar – has crossed the airport runway. This has caused delays and traffic jams as the road closes when aircraft take off and land (more than 15 times per day). Consequently, a bypass tunnel was proposed, to allow traffic to pass under the runway at all times.

==== Construction ====
In the late 2000s, a project to build a tunnel and a four-lane diversion road was approved by the Government of Gibraltar. The construction contract was signed in November 2008 by Chief Minister Sir Peter Caruana. With a cost around £30 million, the project was planned for completion in 2010.

Construction on the project began in December 2008. By the contracted completion date, only 25% of the project had been completed. In July 2011, the Government terminated the contract alleging the contractor Obrascón Huarte Lain (OHL) had failed to comply with the contract. In May 2012, the contractor took the Government to court, alleging wrongful termination of the contract, and sought £6.5 million in damages. In April 2014, the High Court of Justice of England and Wales ordered the contractor to pay the completion costs of the project.

In June 2016, the Government and OHL reached a settlement, with OHL agreeing to complete the project at a price of £24 million, with a completion date of November 2018. Further construction delays owing to sub-standard work meant that the tunnel was not handed over to the Government until summer 2022. Testing and commissioning of various tunnel systems followed, including working with emergency services. The final cost of the project was £34 million.

On 31 March 2023, at one minute past midnight, the new road and tunnel access route to Gibraltar was opened to the public, and vehicular access across the runway was closed. The road was named "Kingsway" in an inauguration ceremony by Chief Minister Fabian Picardo the day before. The naming of the road had been approved by Charles III.

==== Kingsway ====
Kingsway passes under the new terminal and towards the eastern edge of the runway, at which point, it passes through a 350-metre (1,150 ft) tunnel under it and connects via a roundabout with Devil's Tower Road on the opposite side of the runway. After the tunnel on the north side of the runway, Kingsway runs parallel to the frontier, passing under the air terminal fly-over section. The road then branches into two, with one road leading to the loop and the frontier, and another leading to the Air Terminal, North Front, and Winston Churchill Avenue. A dedicated tunnel for use by pedestrians, cyclists and e-scooters is also provided on a higher elevation alongside the road tunnel. The total length of the new road is approximately 1.2 kilometres (0.75 mi).

Although the road across the runway remains in place, for exceptional, specific, or emergency use, it is not available for routine day-to-day use by private vehicular traffic. Pedestrians are not required to travel via the new tunnel, and can continue to cross the runway.

=== New car parks ===
A number of car parks are being built at Gibraltar International during its expansion, including a new 220-space, three-story car park located at the east of the new terminal. Another new car park is to be built by Eastern Beach, and two multi-storey facilities will also be built on Devil's Tower Road.

== Airlines and destinations ==
The following airlines operate regular scheduled flights at Gibraltar Airport:

Airlines	Destinations
British Airways	London–Heathrow
easyJet	Birmingham, Bristol, London–Gatwick, Manchester

== Statistics ==
	passengers	aircraft movements	cargo (tonnes)
2008	378,603	3,958	624
2009	371,231	4,290	313
2010	305,325	3,346	296
2011	383,013	3,628	292
2012	387,219	3,490	314
2013	383,876	3,564	352
2014	415,103	3,730	384
2015	444,336	4,100	408
2016	548,230	4,968	404
2017	571,184	4,888	302
2018	440,998	3,868	192
2019	491,405	4,382	203
2020	186,069	2,290	175
2021	262,522	3,270	111
2022	446,187	3,868	121
2023	473,803	4,082	93
2024	424,386	3,628	98
2025	437,172	3,762	107
Source: Gibraltar Airport Statistics

Busiest routes from Gibraltar to the UK (2025)
rank	airport	total passengers	change 2024 / 25
1	London–Heathrow	191,401	▼1%
2	London–Gatwick	119,978	▼8%
3	Manchester	68,515	▼0.15%
4	Bristol	35,986	▲16%
5	Birmingham	18,835	New Route

== Accidents and incidents ==
- On 4 July 1943, a B-24 Liberator crashed into the sea 16 seconds after taking off from Gibraltar Airport at 23:07 hours, killing all 11 passengers and 5 of the 6 crew. Among the passengers was Lt. Gen. Władysław Sikorski, commander-in-chief of the Polish Army and Prime Minister of the Polish government in exile, who had been inspecting Polish forces in the Middle East during World War II. A British inquiry ruled the crash an accident, concluding that the plane's controls had jammed for an unknown reason. However, several conspiracy theories continue to persist.
- On 3 August 1983, an English Electric Canberra T.17 (WJ625) of 360 Squadron crashed into the sea at the eastern end of the runway. The aircraft entered cloud shortly after a three aircraft take off. WJ625 crashed into the Mediterranean Sea after the pilot became disoriented and lost control. All three crew were killed.
- On 22 May 2002, a Monarch Boeing 757-200 (Registration G-MONC) suffered structural damage to the forward fuselage in the area of the nose landing gear during landing at Gibraltar while operating on a flight from Luton. The captain had used an incorrect landing technique, applying full nose-down elevator. This control input resulted in a high pitch-down rate at nose-wheel touchdown, exceeding the design limits, before the aircraft's nose-wheel had touched the ground. There were no injuries.
- On 17 March 2006, the flight deck crew of a Monarch Boeing 757-200 (Registration G-MONE) lost visual contact with the runway after passing the Visual Decision Point (VDP) while attempting to land at Gibraltar. During the subsequent go-around, the crew did not follow the correct missed approach procedures, but air traffic control (ATC) provided effective heading control to avoid striking high ground. The lowest altitude of the aircraft when over land was 2,100 feet (640 metres). The highest local ground elevation, just south of the airfield, is 1,420 feet (430 metres). Following the incident, ATC and Monarch changed their procedures to reduce the chances of repeating a similar occurrence.
- On 8 February 2017, a Royal Gibraltar Police (RGP) vehicle drove onto the runway in a bid to stop an RAF Airbus A400M Atlas aircraft from taking off. The ensuing stand-off between the RGP and Ministry of Defence caused delays of two hours for anyone crossing the runway via the road crossing. This was due to a serving member of the military on board the RAF aircraft being wanted by the RGP for alleged sex offences. The suspect was eventually removed from the aircraft as well as his personal computer equipment, and the aircraft was allowed to leave two hours later.

== In popular culture ==
The runway featured in a BBC Top Gear special, and was also used by Jaguar in the launch of a new range. A custom painted Boeing 737 was used in conjunction with a fleet of the cars. The airport appeared on Channel 5's series, Gibraltar: Britain in the Sun, which was broadcast from June to July 2013.

The airstrip and the Four Corners Border crossing feature at the end of Carol Reed's 1963 production of The Running Man. Several 'takes' were shot as Remick and Harvey chase each other, firstly through the border and later as the light aircraft took off from the eastern end of the runway, narrowly missing an RAF Halifax aircraft which was supposed to be taking off too.

== See also ==
- RAF Gibraltar
- List of airports in the United Kingdom and the British Crown Dependencies
- Algeciras Heliport, heliport in nearby Spain
