= Streets in Gibraltar =

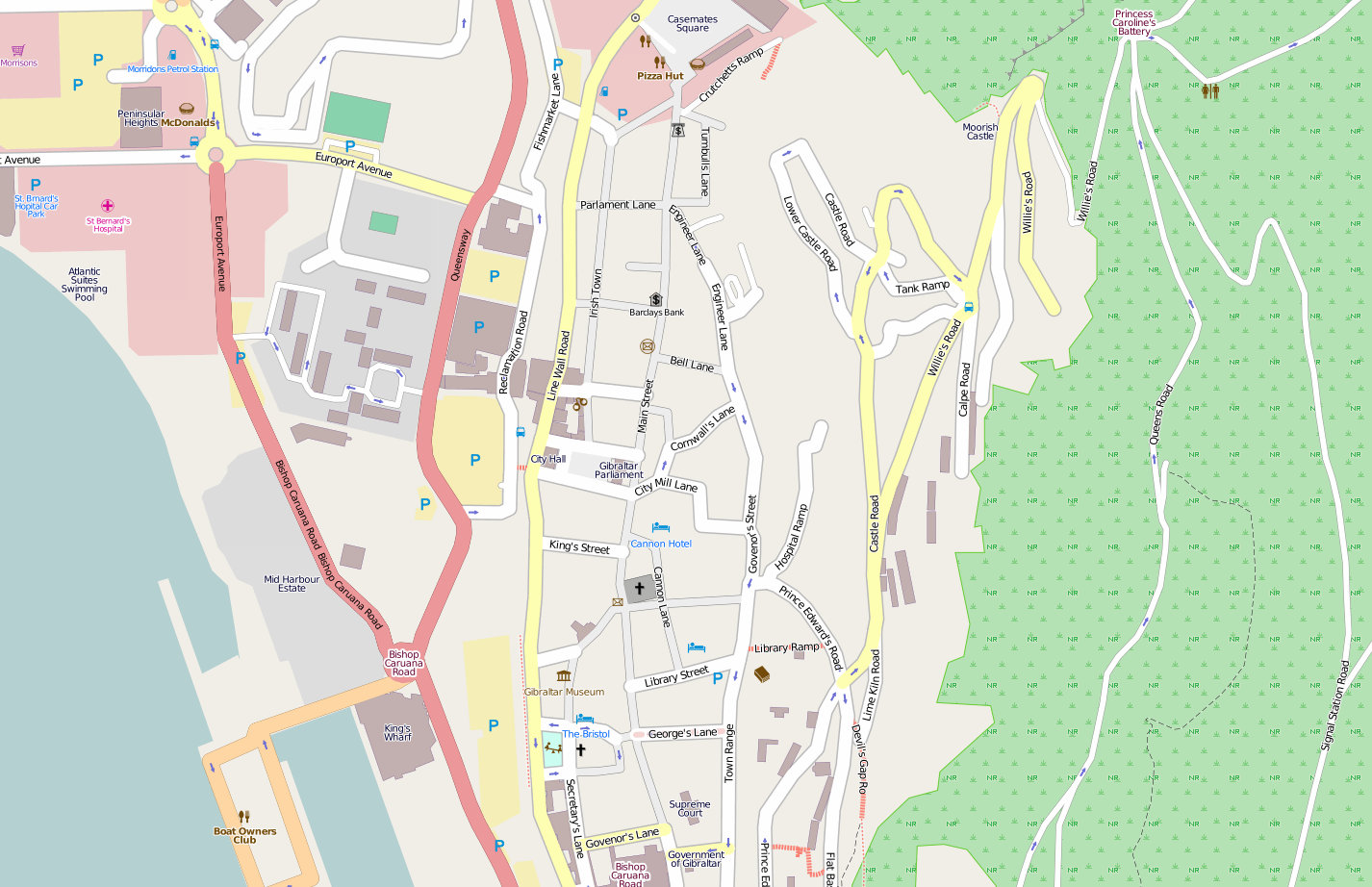
Map depicting some streets of central Gibraltar.

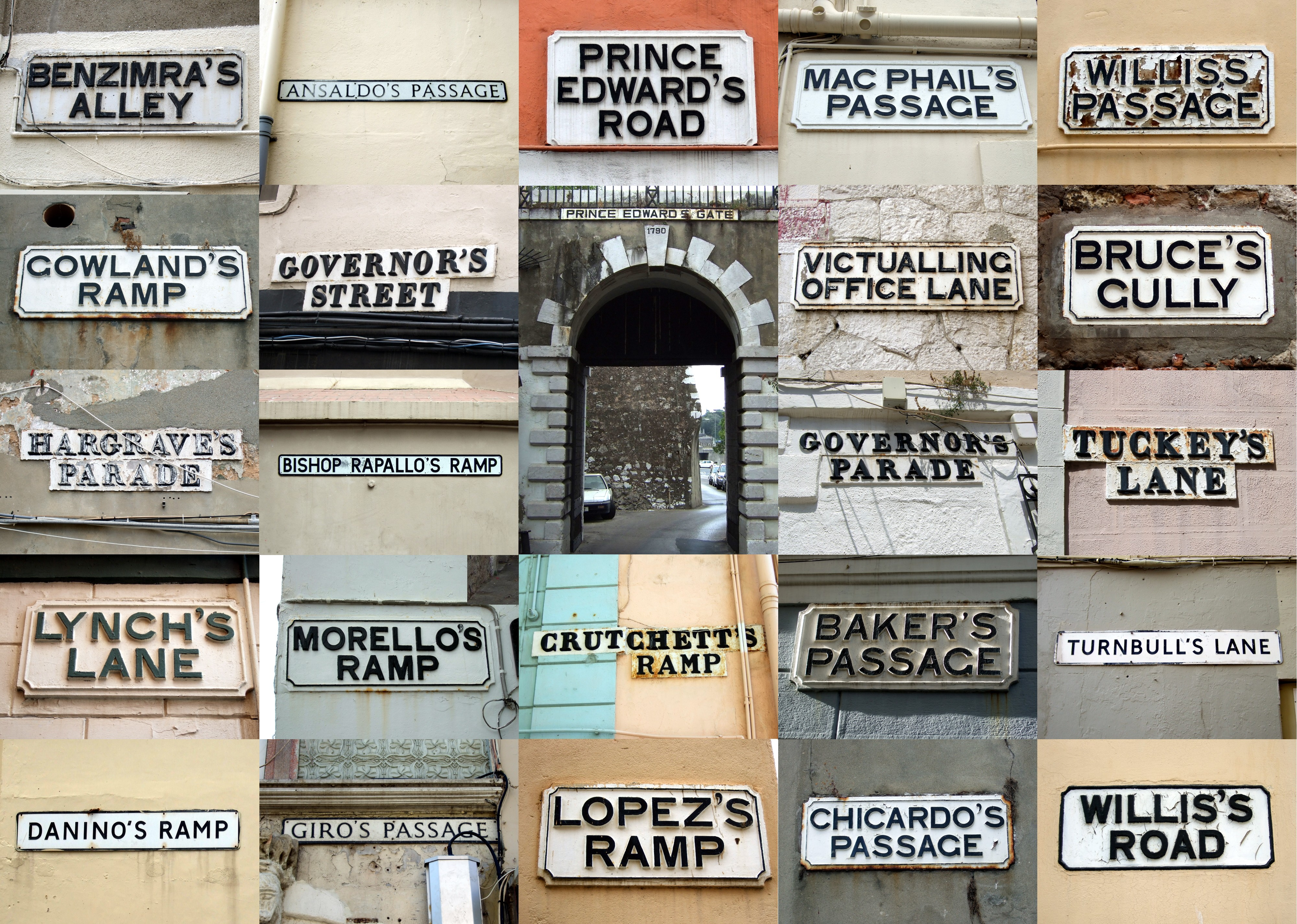
A collage of some of Gibraltar's traditional cast iron street signs.

Streets in the British Overseas Territory of Gibraltar are represented by road signs as in the United Kingdom. As of 2007, Gibraltar has a network of 29 kilometres (18 mi) of roads.

== History ==
Most of the traditional Spanish names for the streets in Gibraltar were established before 1870 when the local police added signs. The new signs did not refer to the older names and this has led to a long running confusion. The deputy librarian of the Garrison Library issued a list of the streets in English and Spanish in the Gibraltar Directory of 1890 to assist.

== Castle Street ==
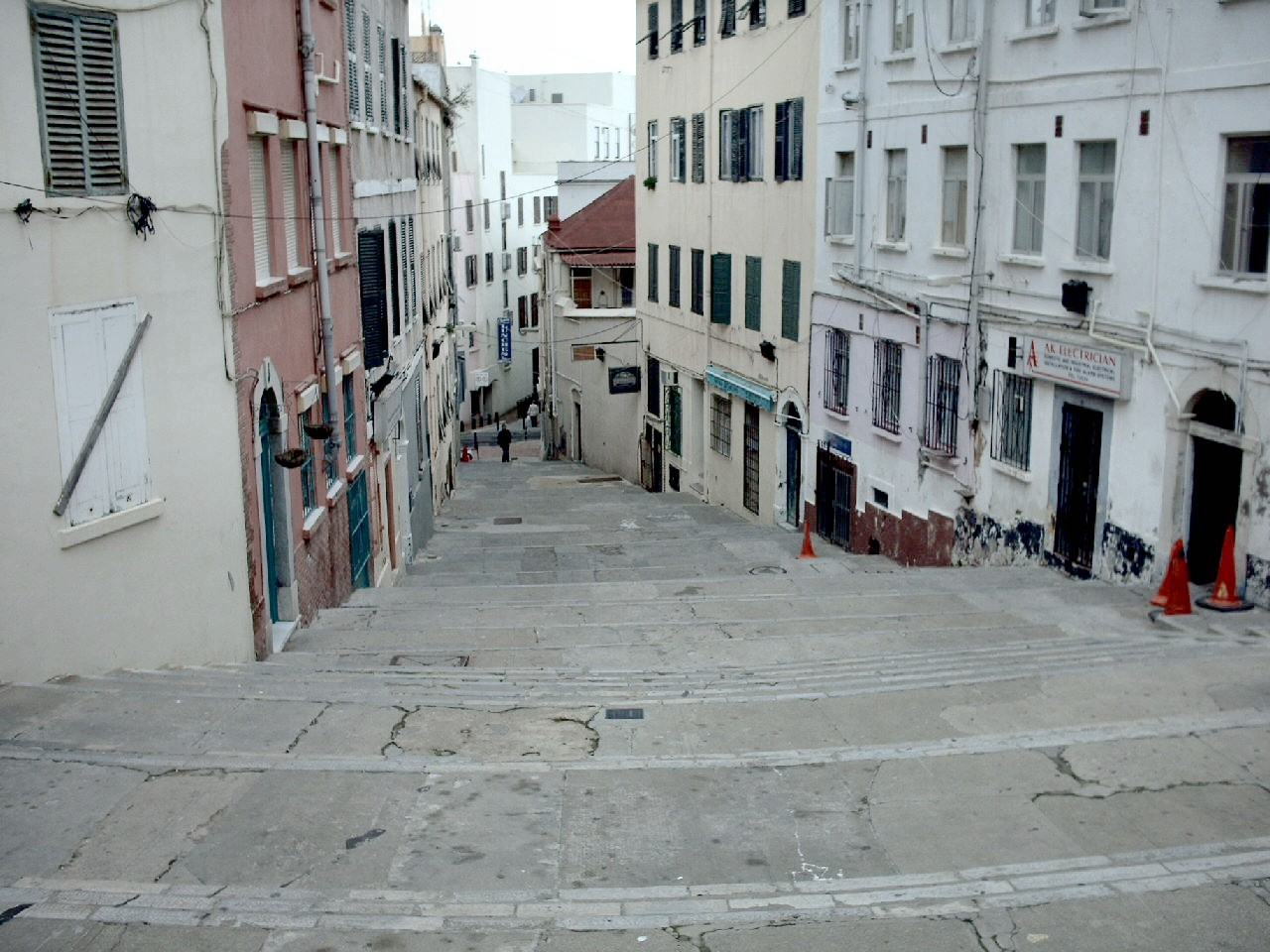
Castle Street

Castle Street (Calle de la Cuesta or more popularly Calle Comedia) runs to the east of the town, to the north of Flat Bastion Road. It is divided into several parts which are named Upper Castle and Lower Castle Road.

The street is also known as Calle Comedia as in the nineteenth century the street had a theatre in what had been a real tennis court which was used for entertainment. This theatre was in use until the Theatre Royal was built in Governor's Parade.

== Cathedral Square ==
The Cathedral Square, a square in the city centre is the location of the Church of England Cathedral of the Holy Trinity which stands to the eastern end of the square. Other features at the square include Duke of Kent House, which is home to the Gibraltar Tourist Board, the Bristol Hotel a children's play park and a boulevard lined with nine cannon overlooking the harbour. Fortress House is also located at 9 Cathedral Square one of the oldest and largest colonial houses on the Rock.

== Devil's Gap Road ==
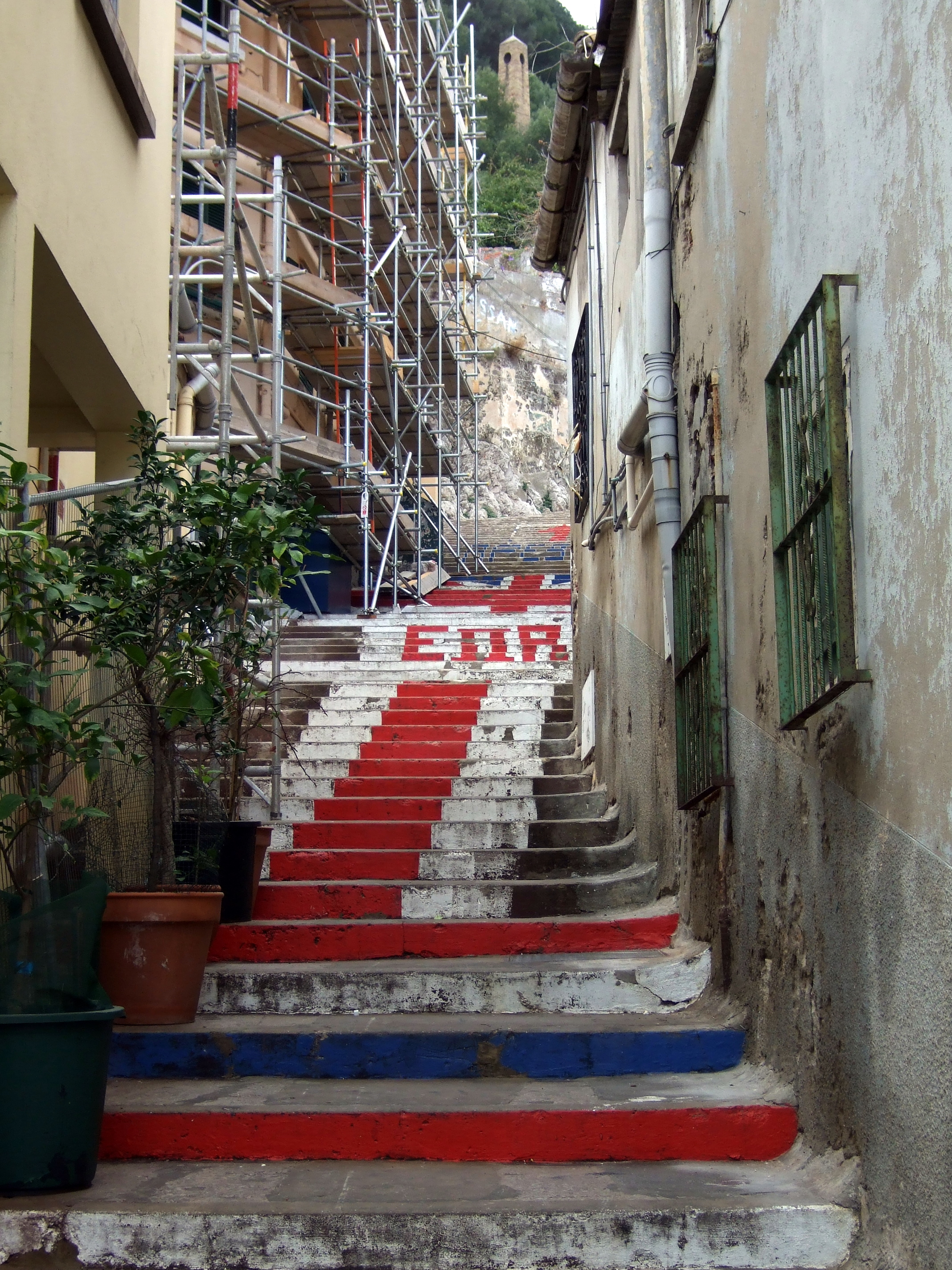
The Devils Gap Road, the steps have been painted with the Union Flag ever since the referendum.

The Devils Gap Road (Escalera de Monte in Spanish) lies between its junction with Flat Bastion in the northern direction and the Upper Kiln Road in the southern direction. Also known as the Union Jack Steps and Referendum Steps, the road was originally painted in 1967 to celebrate the Gibraltar sovereignty referendum of that year. In August 2011, the steps were repainted in red, white, and blue by volunteers intent on restoring the Union Jack.

== Devil's Tower Road ==
Devil's Tower Road is a major road of northeastern Gibraltar. It runs south of Gibraltar International Airport, extending from Winston Churchill Avenue east to Eastern Beach Road. The road was named after Devil's Tower, a 17th-century watchtower which formed part of the northern defences of Gibraltar as mentioned in the Treaty of Utrecht. In 2007, the Government of Gibraltar announced plans for a new airport terminal and diversion of traffic along Devil's Tower Road, with a new access road that would link Devil's Tower Road and the Gibraltar-Spain border. The new access road would pass through a tunnel at the eastern end of the runway. By 2011, Devil's Tower Road had been converted to a dual carriageway, with elimination of on-street parking, and the government had announced a plan to rename the road as North Front Avenue. This decision was met with protests from the community. In August of that year, the Government cancelled the contract with firm OHL for the tunnel and access road for "failure to comply with the terms of the contract." The project had been on hold since December 2010. In 2012, OHL brought legal action against the Government. In August of that year, the tender process for the tunnel and access road was started for the second time. Devil's Tower Road is home to North Front Cemetery, the Gibraltar Memorial, the Gibraltar Cross of Sacrifice, St. Theresa's Church and Devil's Tower Camp with its Princess Royal Medical Centre.

== Dudley Ward Way ==
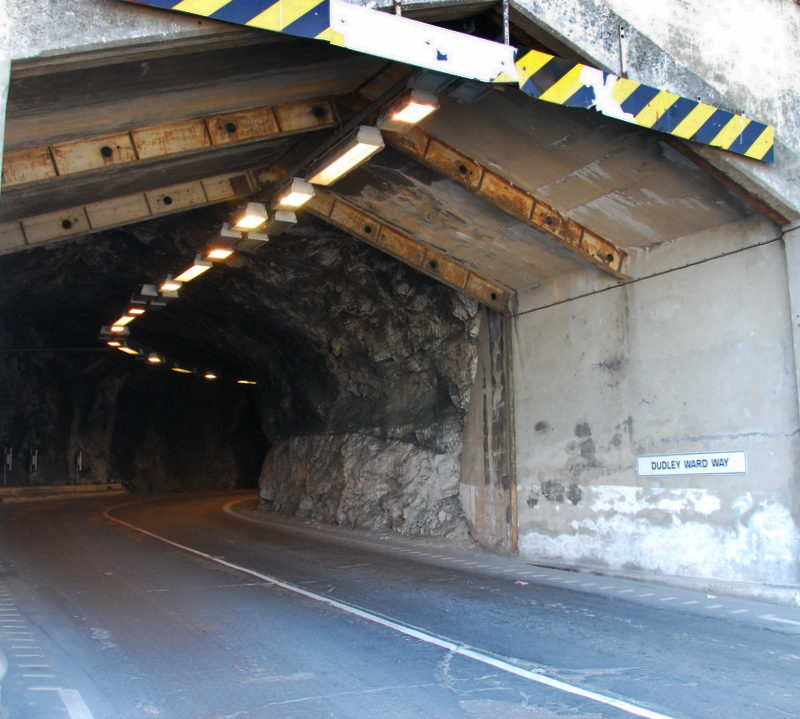
Southern entrance to Dudley Ward Way

Dudley Ward Way is a 500-metre (1,600 ft) long road tunnel through the south-eastern part of the Gibraltar. It is named after Sir Alfred Dudley Ward, Governor of Gibraltar from 8 June 1962 to 5 August 1965. The road running through the tunnel links the eastern side of The Rock (including Catalan Bay and Sandy Bay) via Sir Herbert Miles Road, with Europa Point, at the southern tip of Gibraltar via Europa Advance Road. Dudley Ward Way was built during the 1956-1968 period by the British Army. After the end of military tunnelling and the departure of the Royal Engineer tunnellers the maintenance of the tunnel was transferred to the civilian authorities.

== Europa Road ==
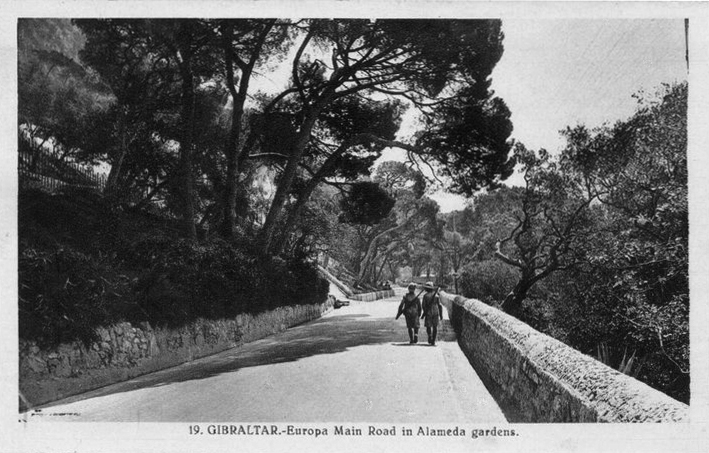
Old postcard depicting the section of Europa Road, between The Rock Hotel and Gibraltar Botanic Gardens.

Europa Road is one of Gibraltar's major roads. With a length of 2.9 kilometres (1.8 mi) it begins near Trafalgar Cemetery and Trafalgar Road and connects the city centre with the southern tip of the territory at Europa Point. Along its way the road passes The Rock Hotel, Gibraltar Botanic Gardens, Royal Naval Hospital and the Ibrahim-al-Ibrahim Mosque.

== Europort Avenue ==
Europort Avenue is built on reclaimed land and buildings include McDonald's fast food, Morrisons supermarket and St Bernard's Hospital. At one end is a roundabout that features a sculpture by Jill Cowie Sanders of a larger than lifesize family being reunited. It was unveiled in 2000 to commemorate the sacrifice made by the people of Gibraltar when they were evacuated during the Second World War.

== Flat Bastion Road ==
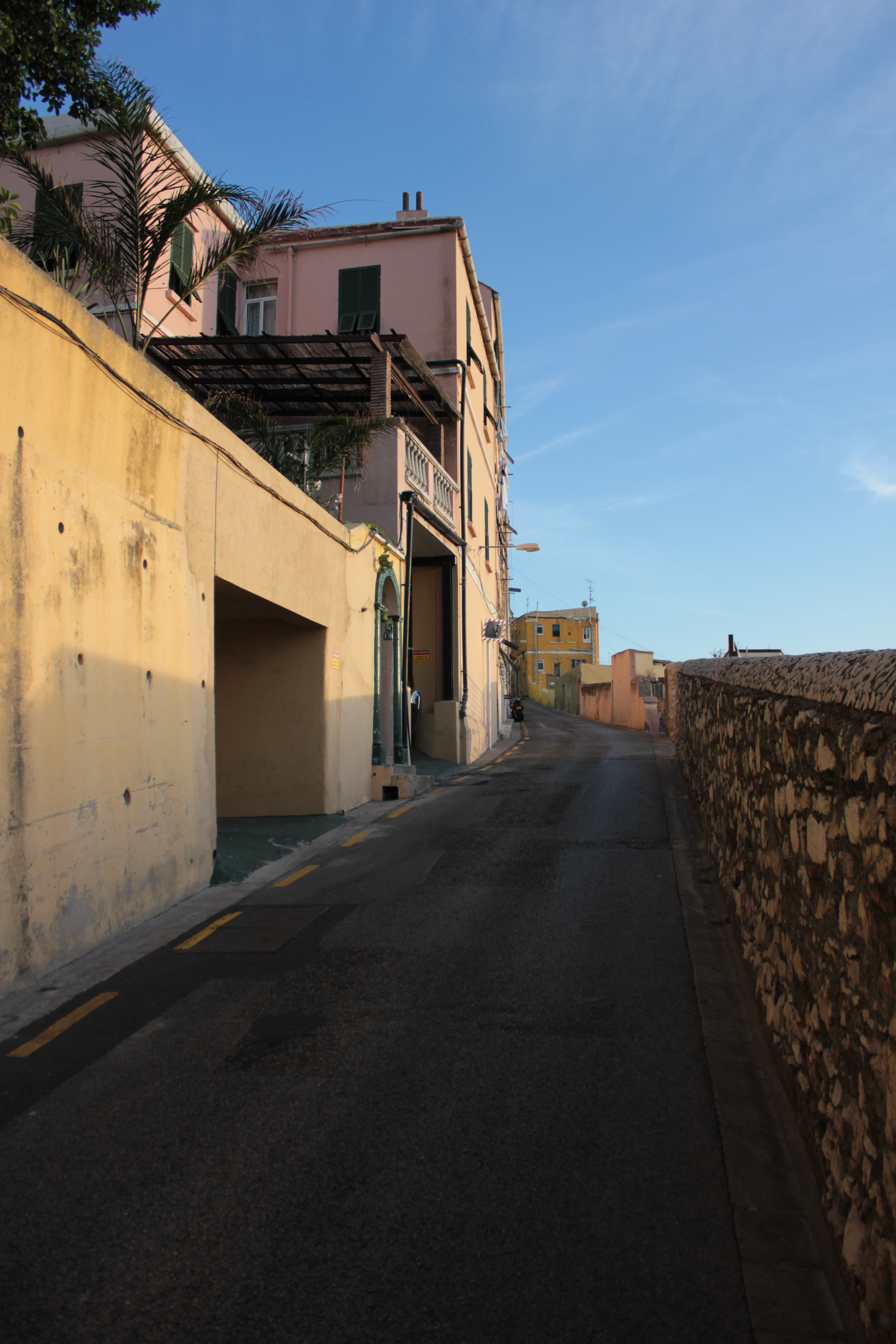
View of Flat Bastion Road looking south.

The 400 metres (1,300 ft) long Flat Bastion Road runs north–south from Devil's Gap Road and becomes Gardiner's Road before entering Europa Road, to The Llanito name for the road is Cuesta de Mr. Bourne, and used to be known in Spanish as Senda del moro (English: Path of the Moor). Located in a mainly wealthy residential area, the road contains some old government buildings. Of note is the Flat Bastion Magazine—now a geological research facility and exhibition centre that forms part of the Flat Bastion. The Gibraltar Public School opened on Flat Bastion Road in 1832 and served as a free institution for impoverished children of all denominations. In 2009 a government initiative proposed putting an additional 104 public parking spots on the road. In 2010 there was public criticism about the lack of parking on the road as the government had removed existing parking before constructing the new parking spaces.

== Glacis Road ==
Glacis Road is a road in northern Gibraltar, the southwestern end of which is the junction with the Waterport Roundabout, where Waterport Road and Queensway Street also intersect. From the roundabout, Glacis Road extends to the northeast. At its mid portion, the road intersects with Bayside Road, at which point it changes course to a southeast direction. Its eastern end intersects with Winston Churchill Avenue. The North District office of the Royal Gibraltar Post Office is on Glacis Road.

== Grand Casemates Square ==
Grand Casemates Square (also known colloquially as Casemates Square or Casemates) is the largest of the two main squares within the city centre (the other being John Mackintosh Square). The square takes its name from the British-built Grand Casemates, a casemate and bombproof barracks at the northern end of the square completed in 1817. The square is lined with numerous pubs, bars and restaurants. and acts as the gateway into Gibraltar's city centre for most tourists. In the past, public executions used to be done at Casemates Square of this street. Main Street extends southward from the square. The area at one time constituted part of the Spanish town Villa Vieja. It was later referred to as Casemates, a term which refers to an arched chamber in a fortification. The damage to this area during the Siege of Gibraltar (1727) was sufficiently severe that the British opted to demolish the buildings and make an esplanade.

== Irish Town ==
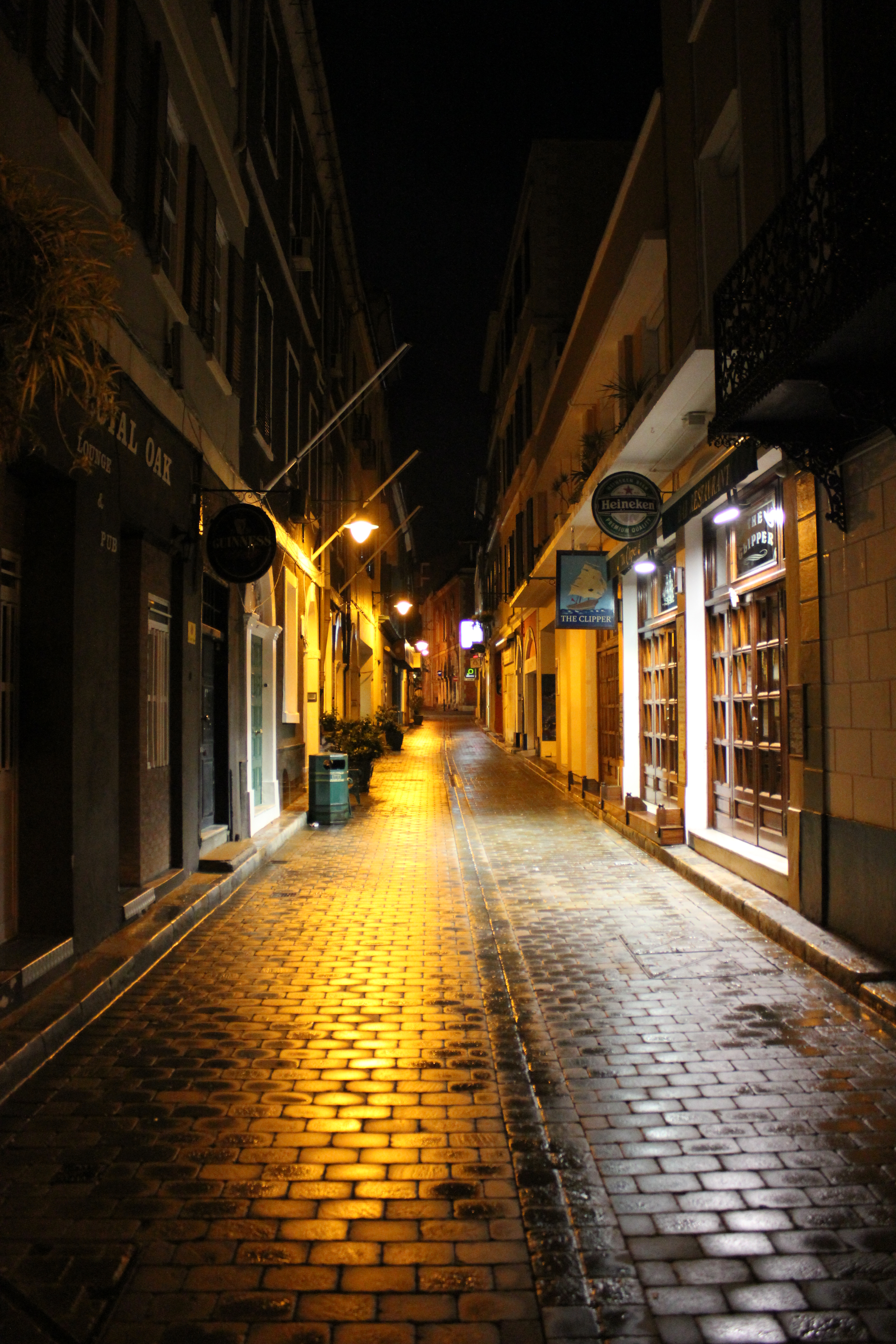
Irish Town.

Irish Town is one of Main Street's sub-districts running parallel to it, from Cooperage Lane in the north to John Mackintosh Square in the south. It was named in the early 19th century when Gibraltar was split into differing quarters although its original name was Calle de Santa Ana after a hermitage on the street. The name irish Town had been attributed to the merchants who lived there but research shows this to be untrue. A credible reason was that an Irish regiment was barracked here. A more colourful explanation is that it named after the ladies who supported that regiment as the street had a reputation in the 18th century.

== John Mackintosh Square ==
John Mackintosh Square is referred to colloquially as The Piazza. While it has had a variety of names over the centuries, during the 19th century, it was known as Commercial Square. Its name was changed to honour the philanthropist John Mackintosh when he died in 1940. The square is the home to the Gibraltar Parliament, Gibraltar City Hall, Gibtelecom and the Gibraltar Heritage Trust.

== Keightley Way ==
Keightley Way is a southwestern road and tunnel in Gibraltar. It connects Rosia Road at Rosia Bay to the Ibrahim-al-Ibrahim Mosque and Nun's Well at Europa Point.

== Line Wall Road ==
Line Wall Road is one of the main roads leading into the town centre. It runs immediately east of the Line Wall Curtain in a north–south direction, connecting Smith Dorrien Avenue near Grand Casemates Square with the southern end of Main Street at Southport Gates. It runs parallel with Queensway through much of its length at an elevated level.

== Main Street ==
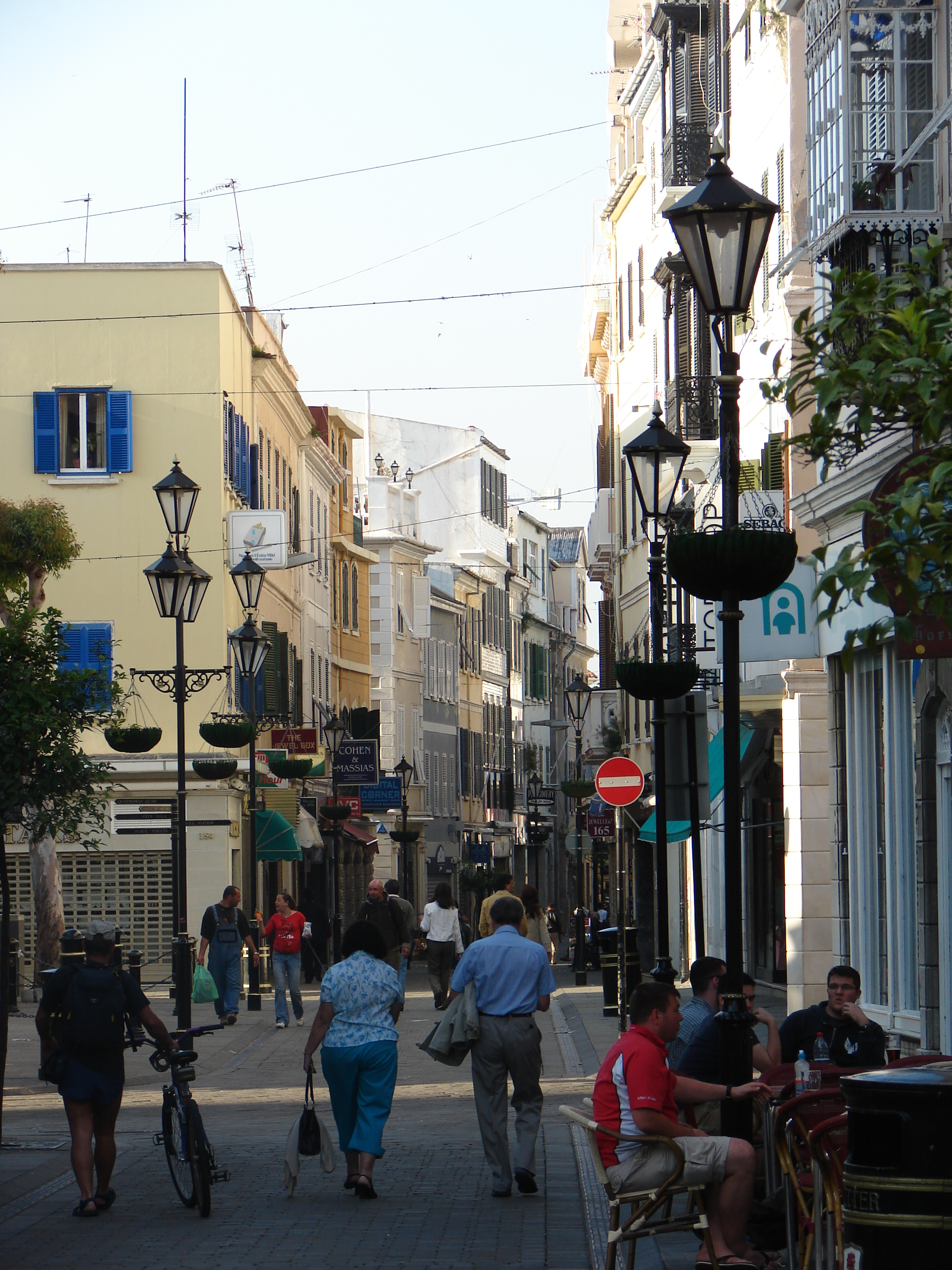
Main Street

Main Street (Spanish: Calle Real) is the main arterial street in Gibraltar and its main commercial and shopping district. The street runs north–south through the old town which is pedestrianised and lined with buildings displaying a blend of Genoese, Portuguese, Andalusian, Moorish and British Regency styles, most of which have shops on the ground floor. Upper floors provide residential accommodation or offices. It contains wide variety of shops, many of which are familiar from British high streets such as a branch of Marks & Spencer. Gibraltar's town centre is largely protected by the Gibraltar Heritage Trust and is part of a continual restoration programme.

== Queen's Road ==
Queen's Road is the longest road in Gibraltar. It runs north–south through the Upper Rock Nature Reserve. It forks into Old Queen's Road which runs almost parallel with it for some part.

== Queensway ==
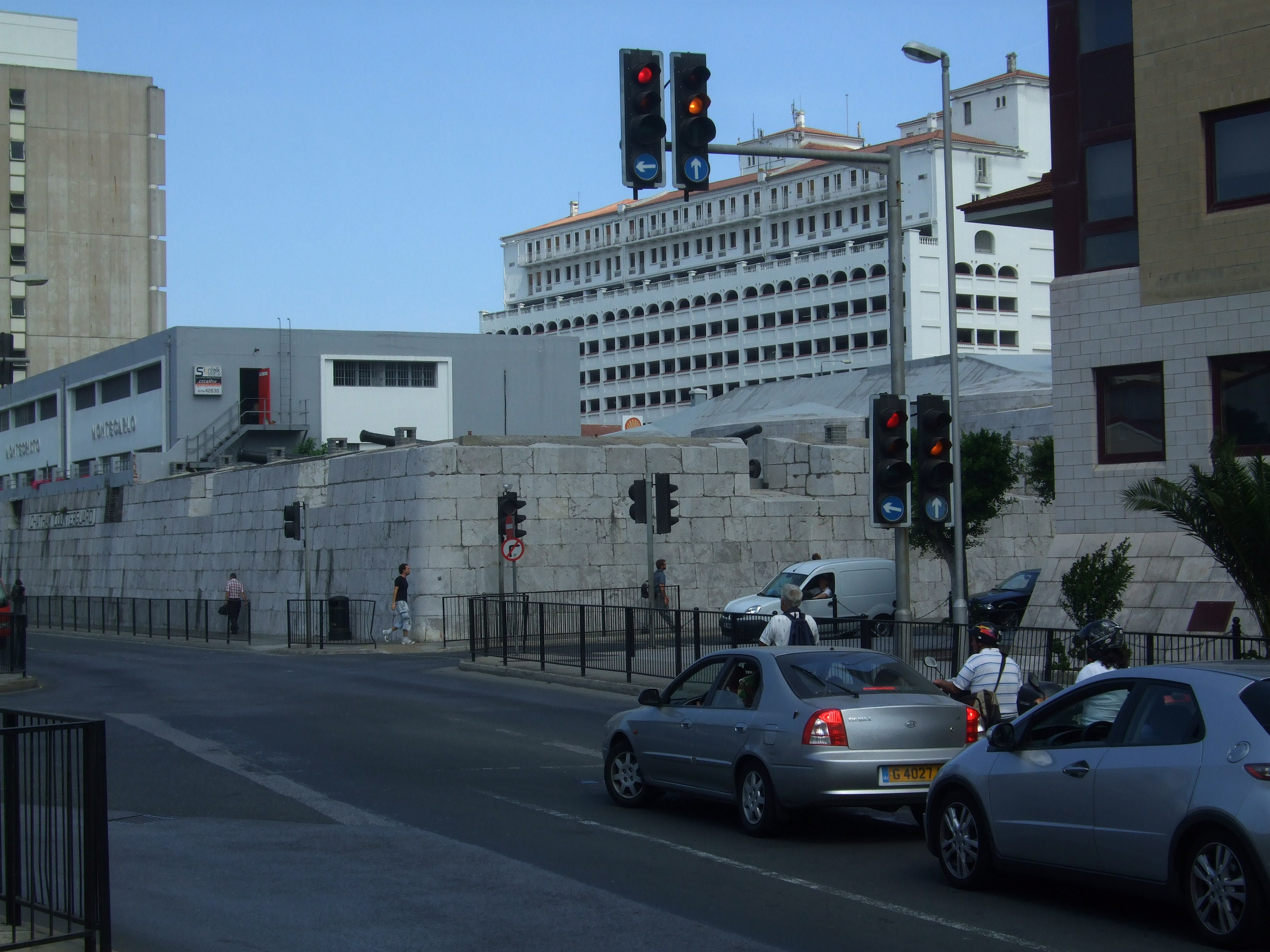
Queensway

Queensway is the most important coastal road in Gibraltar. In connects the marina with the industrial park in the south and passes all of the harbours and ports on the west coast.

== Rosia Road ==
Rosia Road connects with Main Street and flows in a north–south direction, running parallel with Queensway for more of its length but ends further south at Rosia Bay where it joins Keightley Way. Rosia Road is the site of the Naval dockyard, the shipyard Gibdock, the headquarters of the Royal Gibraltar Police, the Napier of Magdala Battery, the Parson's Lodge Battery, the Victualling Yard, and the demolished Rosia Water Tanks.

== Sir Herbert Miles Road ==
Sir Herbert Miles Road is an eastern coastal road of Gibraltar. It was a new road in 1917 replacing a track that had been the access to Catalan Bay. It was named for Sir Herbert Miles who was a Governor of Gibraltar. Sir Herbert Miles Promenade, a former battery, is also named after him.

== Town Range ==
Town Range is also known in Spanish as Calla Cuarteles as this reflects the older name of New Barracks Street. It is noted for two large sets of barracks which have been said to be the "most magnificent" British buildings in Gibraltar. The buildings have been reused with one being used for St Mary's School.

== Turnbull's Lane ==
Turnbull's Lane is known as detras de los cuartos in Spanish. Its English name is taken from a once local merchant and his son who were both named John Turnbull. The younger John Turnbull left the rock during the Great Siege of Gibraltar but he kept links for fifty years. He had met Captain Francisco de Miranda in 1774 in Gibraltar. Miranda who was visiting from Spain returned to fight in the American Revolutionary War become a French general and a Venezuelan revolutionary. Turnbull remained Miranda's banker and agent even when their respective countries were at war.

== Willis' Road ==
This is the main road of northeastern Gibraltar. It leads from the northeast coast to Castle Road. The road is named after a Marine Lieutenant Thomas Willis who in 1704 installed the first guns in Princess Charlotte's Battery. This battery was initially named Willis' Battery.

== Winston Churchill Avenue ==
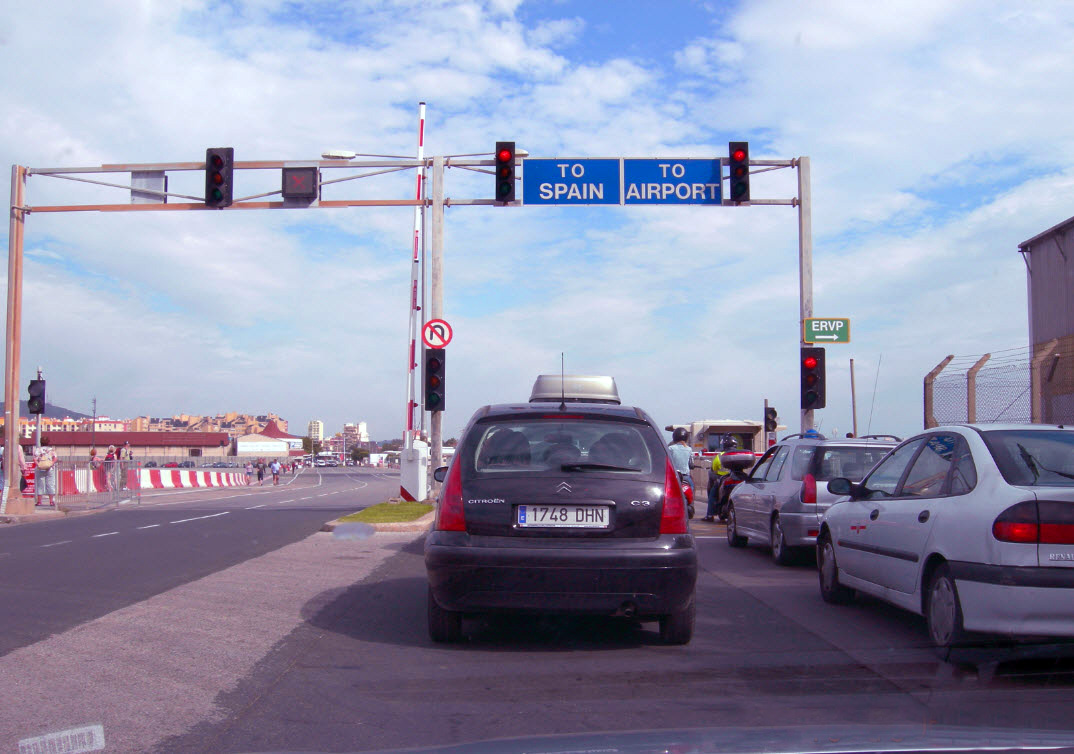
Winston Churchill Avenue

Winston Churchill Avenue is a northern 1.5 km arterial road which is the only road in and out of the territory, connecting it with Spain. Once the customs are crossed, the avenue becomes the dual carriageway (Spanish: Autovía) CA-34 (former national road N-351). The road intersects the runway of the Gibraltar Airport; movable barricades close when aircraft land or take off. In 2009, the Government of Gibraltar announced that a new highway will be built in order to avoid the crossing of the airport runway. The new road, a dual carriageway, will link the customs checkpoint with Devil's Tower Road, crossing the airport runway underground, through a 350-metre tunnel.

== Other ==
King Street, Market Lane and Tuckey's Lane and short lanes running between Main Street and Line Wall Road. Library Street runs between Main Street and Town Range, leading to the Garrison Library. Bell Lane runs between Main Street and Engineer Lane. Other streets include George's Lane, Prince Edward's Road, Lime Kiln Road and Governor's Street.

== New road proposal ==
A new 1.24-kilometre (0.77 mi) road connecting Gibraltar to Spain with access to the airport was proposed and the contract was awarded in 2009 to OBL at a cost of €35.78 million. This road would bypass the current road which crosses the runway of the airport. The planning and design of the road included two lanes in each direction, linking the border with Spain to the Devil's Tower Road. It would also provide links to the Eastern Beach Road and Road Catalan; two bridges for cyclists and pedestrians a were also proposed parallel to the highway.

== Map gallery ==
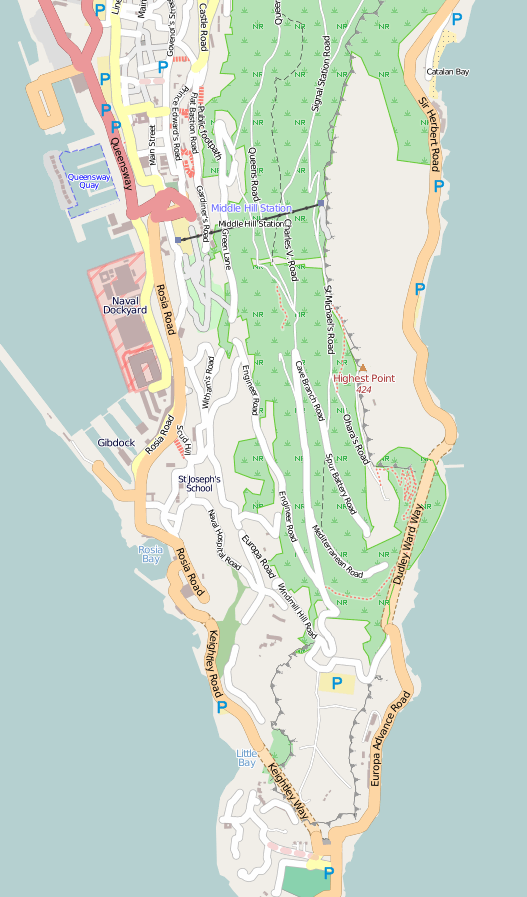
Southern

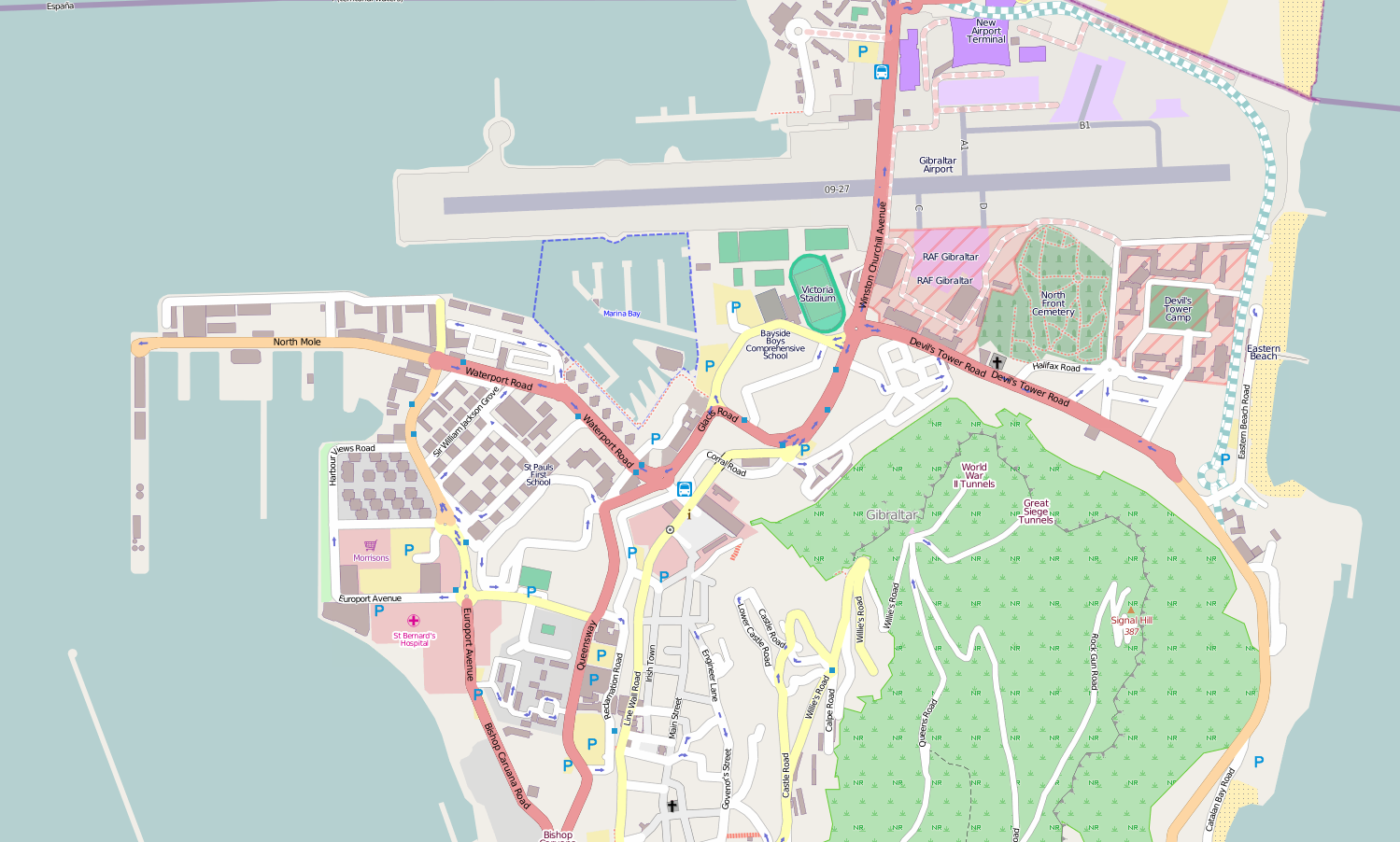
Northern

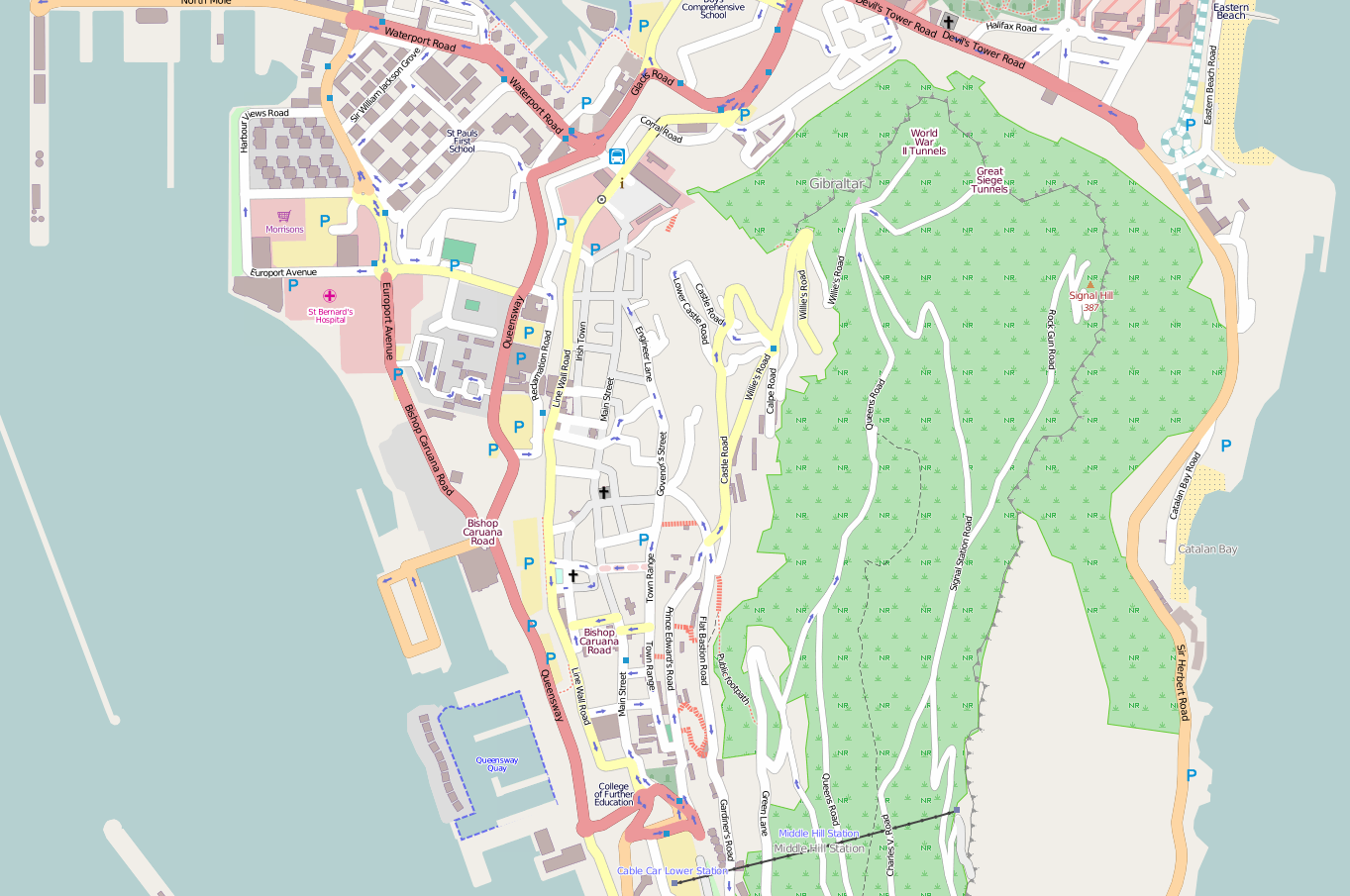
Central
