= Rosia Road =

Coordinates: 36°7′37.67″N 5°21′7.1″W

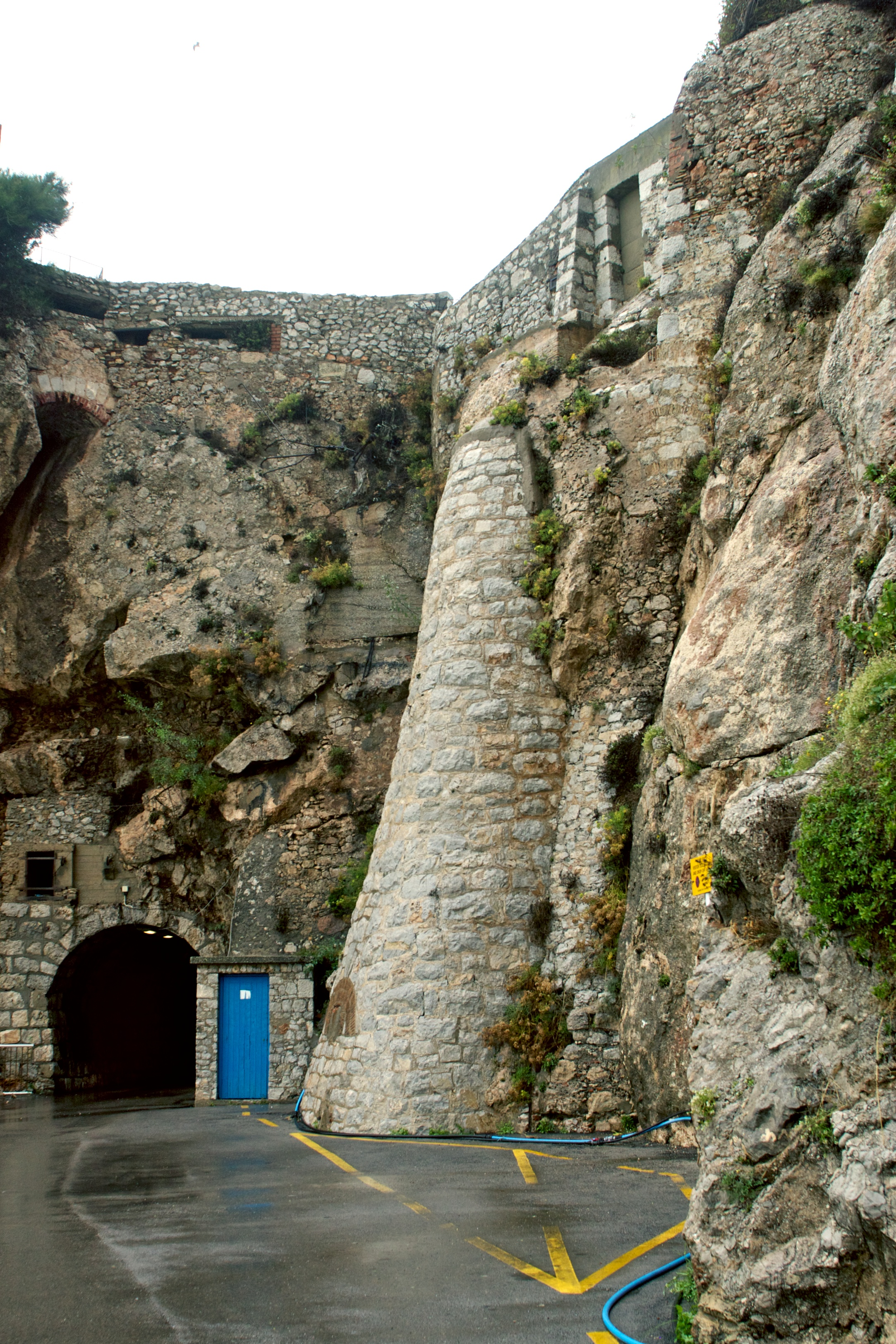
- Rosia Rd. tunnel in Camp Bay, Gibraltar

Location
- Country: United Kingdom
- Overseas territory: Gibraltar

Road network
- Streets in Gibraltar

Rosia Road is a western road in the British Overseas Territory of Gibraltar. It connects with Boyd Street in the north and flows in a north–south direction, joining Keightley Way in the south. Rosia Road is the site of the Naval dockyard, Nelson's Anchorage the shipyard Gibdock, the headquarters of the Royal Gibraltar Police, Napier of Magdala Battery, Parson's Lodge Battery, the Victualling Yard, and the demolished Rosia Water Tanks.
