= Rosia Water Tanks =

- Location within Gibraltar

General information
- Location: Rosia Bay, Gibraltar
- Coordinates: 36.12130°N 5.35179°W
- Construction started: 1799
- Completed: 1804
- Demolished: 2006

Design and construction
- Main contractor: John Maria Boschetti

The Rosia Water Tanks were large water tanks built at the turn of the nineteenth century at Rosia Bay in the British Overseas Territory of Gibraltar. They were constructed based on the recommendation by Admiral John Jervis, 1st Earl of St Vincent that the Victualling Yard complex be relocated to Rosia Bay. The complex allowed Royal Navy vessels to obtain both food and water at one site. The Rosia Water Tanks remained in the possession of the Ministry of Defence until 2004, at which time they were transferred to the Government of Gibraltar. Despite local and international criticism, and a court case brought by the Gibraltar Heritage Trust, the tanks were demolished in 2006 to make way for affordable housing. When developer OEM International's funding proved insufficient to complete the project the government repossessed the site.

== History ==
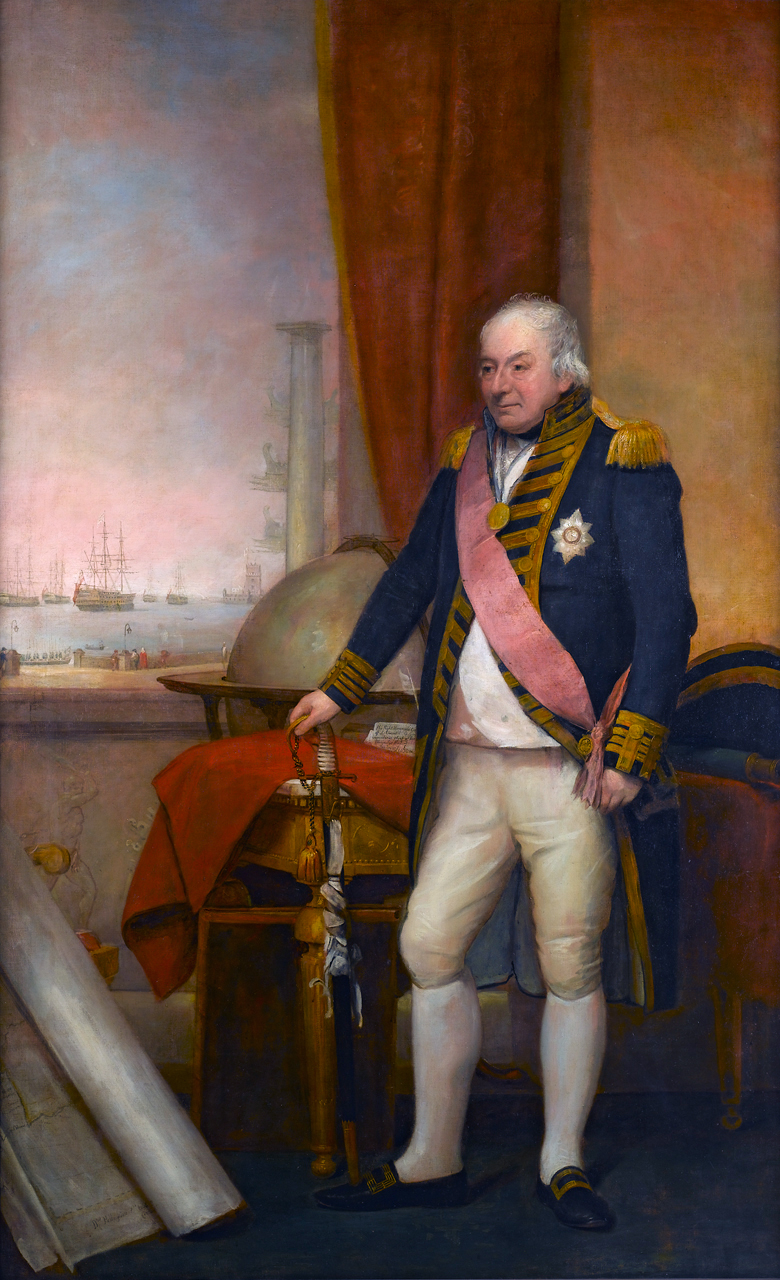
Admiral John Jervis recommended construction of the Rosia Water Tanks at Rosia Bay.

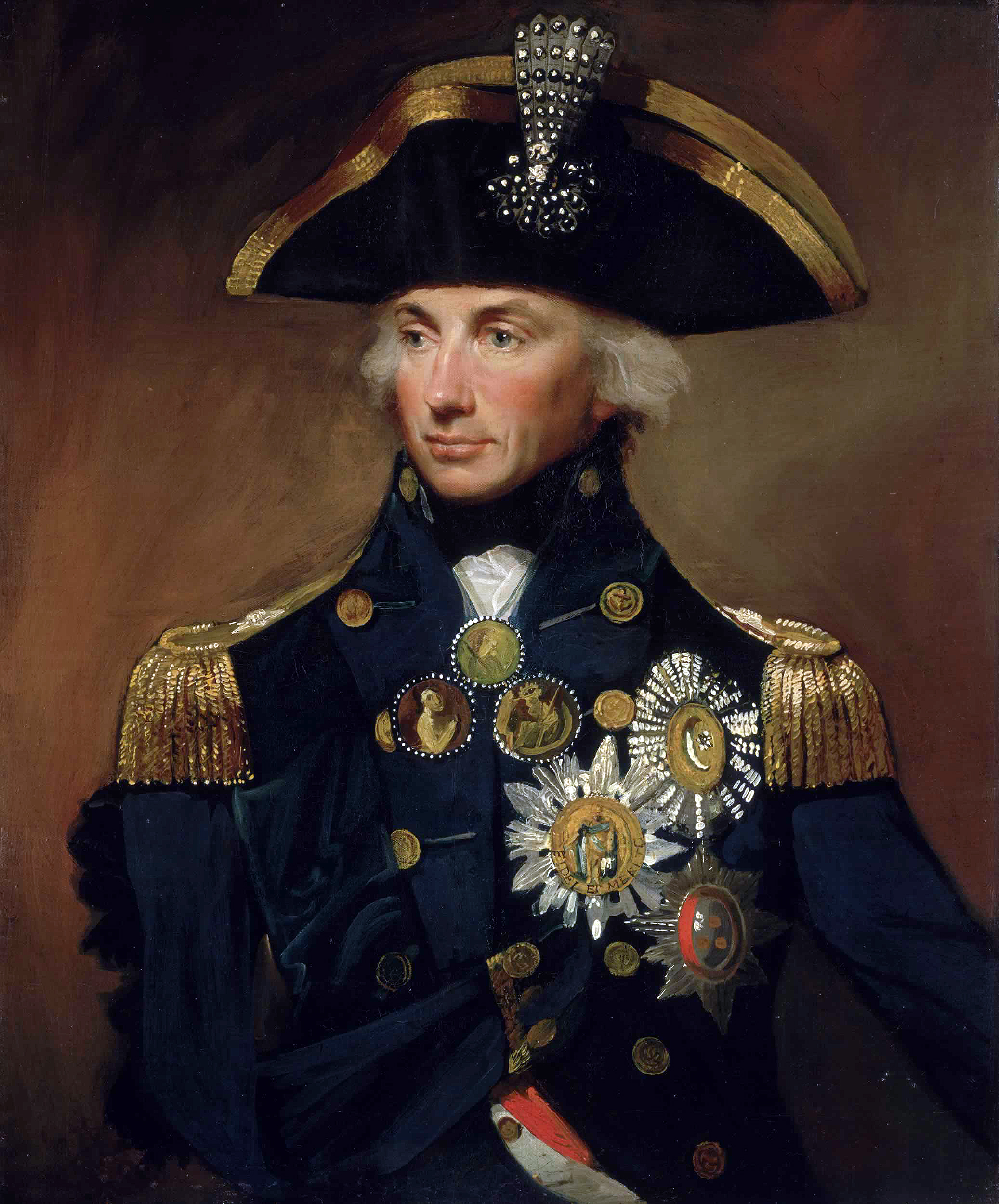
The Rosia Water Tanks allowed Vice Admiral Horatio Nelson to provide for his Royal Navy vessels.

John Jervis, 1st Earl St Vincent (1735–1823), Admiral in Charge of the Mediterranean Fleet, made recommendations in 1799 concerning the location of the Victualling Yard in Gibraltar. St Vincent advised the Victualling Yard be relocated from the Old Mole area to Rosia Bay so that both water and food could be provided to Royal Navy vessels from one site. Governor O'Hara did not approve of St Vincent's plan because he proposed to finance it by selling the naval stores at Waterport and Irish Town. However St Vincent won.

Not only did the site allow access to the bay, the presence of Parson's Lodge Battery afforded protection from gunfire. The Victualling Yard complex, including the Victualling Yard, Rosia Water Tanks, and Rosia Mole, was constructed at the turn of the nineteenth century, the tanks begun in 1799 and finished in 1804.

The Rosia Water Tanks consisted of six parallel underground chambers built by contractor Giovanni Maria Boschetti adjacent to the Victualling Yard of bricks brought from Britain and sand-lime mortar, then waterproofed. The roofs of the Victualling Yard served as a catchment directing rain to a settlement tank, which was then purified by flowing it successively from one tank to the next. The lowest tank was sufficiently high to gravity feed vessels berthed at Rosia Mole. Hoses were used to supply vessels within Rosia Bay, a lighter barge those anchored off it in Gibraltar Harbour.

The Victualling Yard complex, including the tanks, enabled Vice Admiral Horatio Nelson (1758–1805) to maintain his fleet in the Mediterranean. Four days before the 1805 Battle of Trafalgar Lord Nelson notified Rear Admiral John Knight of a water shortage aboard his flagship, HMS Victory, requesting he keep the matter to himself. That letter to Knight, written with Nelson's left hand, as he had lost his right hand, went up for auction at Sotheby's in July 2010.

Nelson died during the battle. Afterward Victory was towed into Rosia Bay and anchored. In addition repairing their ship, the sailors replenished their supplies of food and water. The vessel then returned to England with Nelson's body.

=== Twentieth century ===
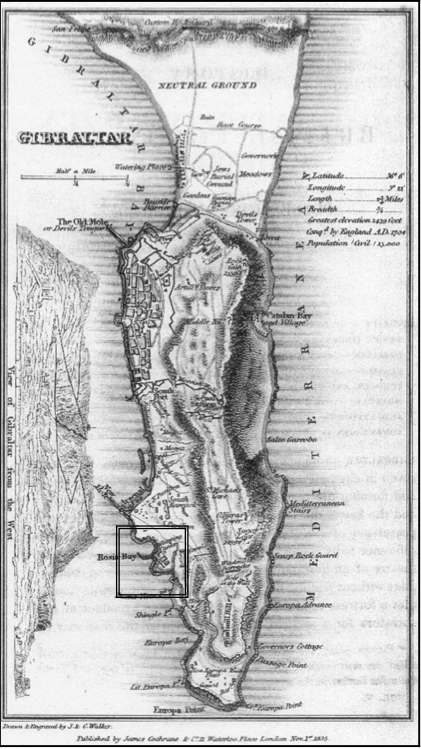
1835 Map of Gibraltar, with Victualling Yard, Rosia Water Tanks, and Rosia Mole

The tanks were in sufficient condition in the 1950s the navy constructed Rosia Distillery adjacent to the Rosia Cottages. It supplied water from the tanks to lighters which supplied vessels moored in Gibraltar Harbour. The tanks provided the community with water into the late twentieth century. They remained in the possession of the Ministry of Defence through the end of the twentieth century.

=== Twenty-first century ===
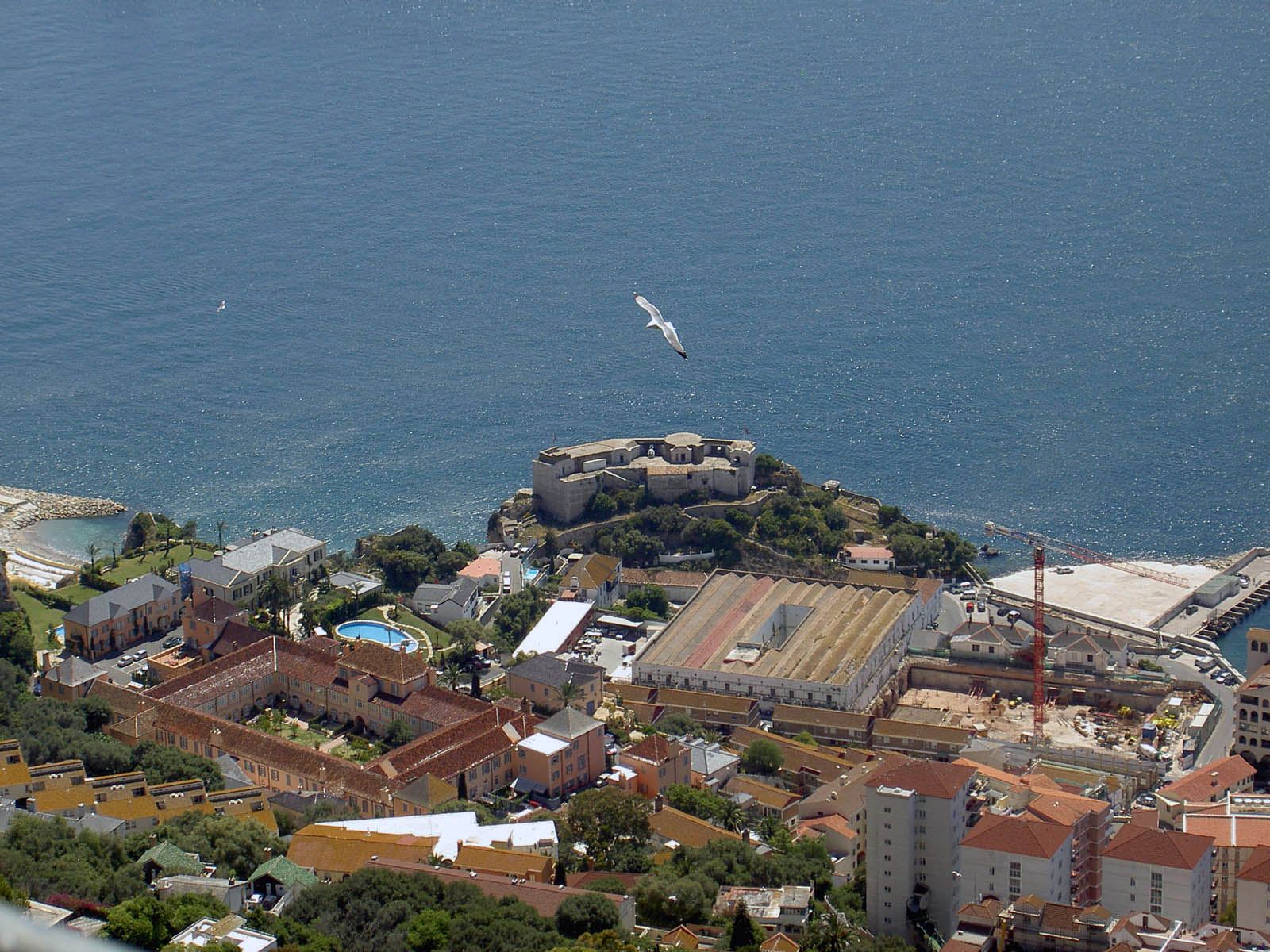
Former Royal Naval Hospital (left), Parson's Lodge Battery (centre), Victualling Yard (centre right), construction site at former Rosia Water Tanks (right)

The Rosia Water Tanks were used by the Ministry of Defence until April 2004, at which time they were transferred to the Government of Gibraltar. The Gibraltar Heritage Trust sought a legal remedy when the government planned to demolish the tanks and construct a building offering affordable housing, Nelson's View, and underground car parking at the site. During a visit permitted by the courts in January 2006, historian Lionel Culatto assessed the tanks and found them to be in good condition. However, shortly thereafter, the Gibraltar Heritage Trust voted to drop its court case due to fears of the mounting legal costs. The vote prompted the resignations of the trust's chairman, Joe Ballantine, and another board member, Denis King, and also called into question the ability of the Gibraltar Heritage Trust to accomplish its stated mission.

In February 2006, Marcus Binney, Fellow of the Society of Antiquaries of London and Architecture Correspondent of The Times, wrote about the controversy. In his column "Nelson caves to be turned into a car park," Binney reported that:

Under heavy pressure from the Gibraltar Government and the Irish development company OEM International, the Gibraltar Heritage Trust withdrew last week an injunction delaying the construction of a block of 200 flats on top of the Rosia Water Tanks.

Dr. Ann Coats, Secretary of the Naval Dockyards Society and author of History of the Rosia Water Tanks, Gibraltar, described the Rosia Water Tanks as:

A unique engineering monument to Royal Navy ingenuity and Gibraltarian craftsmanship, transforming Gibraltar into an invincible fortress. They enabled Nelson and Admiral Lord St Vincent to maintain their fleets in the Mediterranean, blockading Toulon and vanquishing the French at the Battle of the Nile.

Appeals were made to the Governor of Gibraltar, Sir Francis Richards, to list the tanks with the Gibraltar Heritage Trust. Despite the pleas, neither the tanks nor the Victualling Yard were listed in 2006. Listing was limited to the entrance to the yard. The Rosia Water Tanks were demolished in August 2006 despite strong opposition. The government's actions were the subject of local and international criticism.

Jonathan Coad, also a Fellow of the Society of Antiquaries of London, is with English Heritage. The author of The Royal Dockyards 1690–1850, he is considered to be a preeminent authority on Royal Naval Dockyard architecture. He contacted the Naval Dockyards Society, expressing his dismay over "the destruction of the vaulted underground storage tanks, which were a remarkable construction feat", and continued that "equally serious will be the impact of the multi-storey building upon the enclosure of the Victualling Yard which will seriously affect the whole setting of this remarkable enclave and destroy the intimate scale of this area."

On 3 February 2006, the Government of Gibraltar issued a press release in which it acknowledged that the Nelson's View Development at the Rosia Water Tanks site had been awarded to the developer (OEM International) without a bidding process. In December 2007, the government repossessed the affordable housing project, initially claiming that it was to protect home purchasers from delays related to litigation. Later, it was learned the developers had defaulted on a £3.5m payment to the contractor. It was revealed that the development at the former Rosia Water Tanks site would have to be "bail[ed] out from public funds." The government announced that:

Following the failure of OEM (International) Limited to satisfy the Government that they have sufficient funding available to finish the Nelson's View, Cumberland Terraces and Bayview Terraces affordable housing schemes, the sites have been repossessed by the Government.

In November 2011, the government indicated that of the 341 apartments that had been sold at Nelson's View, Bayview, and Cumberland Terraces, 239 of the residences had been sold on "co-ownership" terms.
