= OEM (disambiguation) =

OEM is an original equipment manufacturer, a company that makes a part or subsystem that is used in another company's end product.

OEM may also refer to:

== Computing ==
- Object Exchange Model, a model for exchanging data between object-oriented databases
- OEM font, or OEM-US, the original character set of the IBM PC, c. 1981
- Oracle Enterprise Manager, a computer application that aims to manage software produced by Oracle Corporation

== Organisations ==
- OEM International, a former construction company in Gibraltar
- Office for Emergency Management, a World War II function within the Executive Office of the United States Government
- Office of Emergency Management, a general term for emergency management functions
- Oklahoma Department of Emergency Management, for coordinating the response to a natural disaster
- Organización Editorial Mexicana, a Mexican print media company

== Other uses ==
- Occupational and Environmental Medicine, a medical journal
