= Rosia Bay =

Natural harbour in Gibraltar

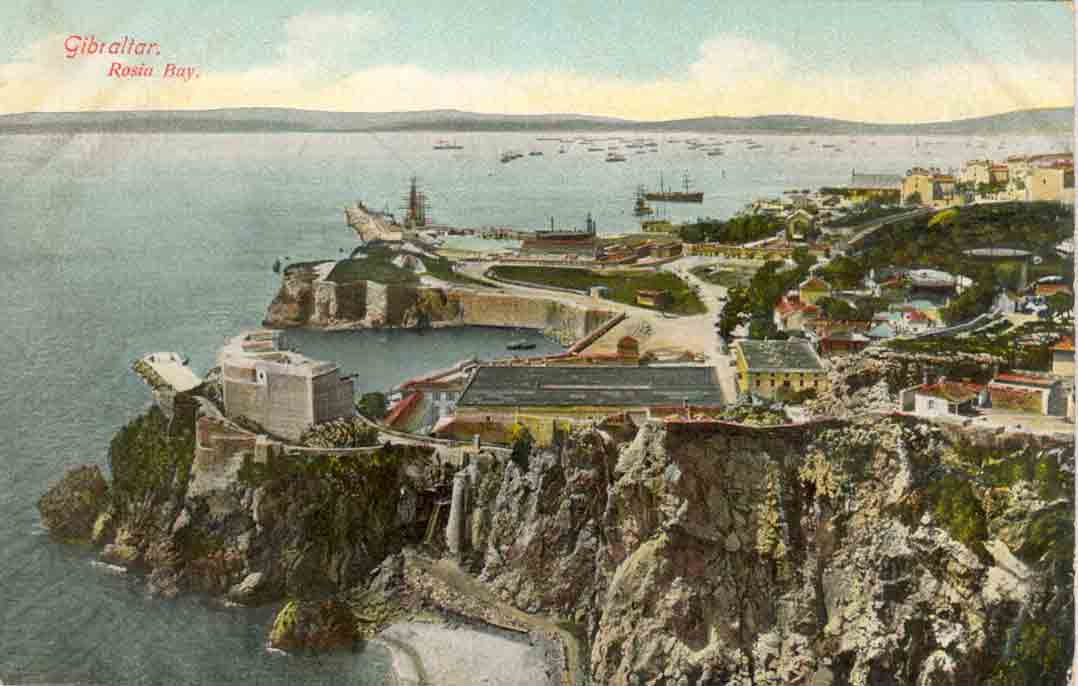
- An old postcard depicting Rosia Bay circa 1909, with Parson's Lodge Battery (left) and Victualling Yard (centre).
- Interactive map of Rosia Bay

Location
- Country: Gibraltar
- Location: Bay of Gibraltar
- Coordinates: 36.1218°N 5.3531°W

Details
- Owned by: Government of Gibraltar
- Type of Harbor: Natural/Artificial
- No. of piers: one (Rosia Mole)

Rosia Bay is the only natural harbour in Gibraltar, the British Overseas Territory at the southern end of the Iberian Peninsula. Formerly referred to as Rosia Harbour, it is located on the southwest side of Gibraltar. Rosia Bay was the site of the Royal Navy Victualling Yard complex which was constructed in the early 19th century, allowing vessels to anchor and obtain provisions, including food and water. Vice Admiral Horatio Nelson obtained supplies for his Mediterranean Fleet at Rosia Bay. It was to that same anchorage that his vessel HMS Victory was towed after Nelson's death in the 1805 Battle of Trafalgar. The area is also the location of gun batteries, including Parson's Lodge Battery at the south end of the bay and Napier of Magdala Battery at the north end. In the 21st century, Rosia Bay was the focus of controversy following the government's demolition of the historic Rosia Water Tanks and construction of the affordable housing development Nelson's View, which necessitated the relocation of the owners of the adjacent 19th century Rosia Cottages.

== Victualling Yard complex and Rosia Cottages ==
Map of Gibraltar showing Rosia Bay along its southwestern coast.

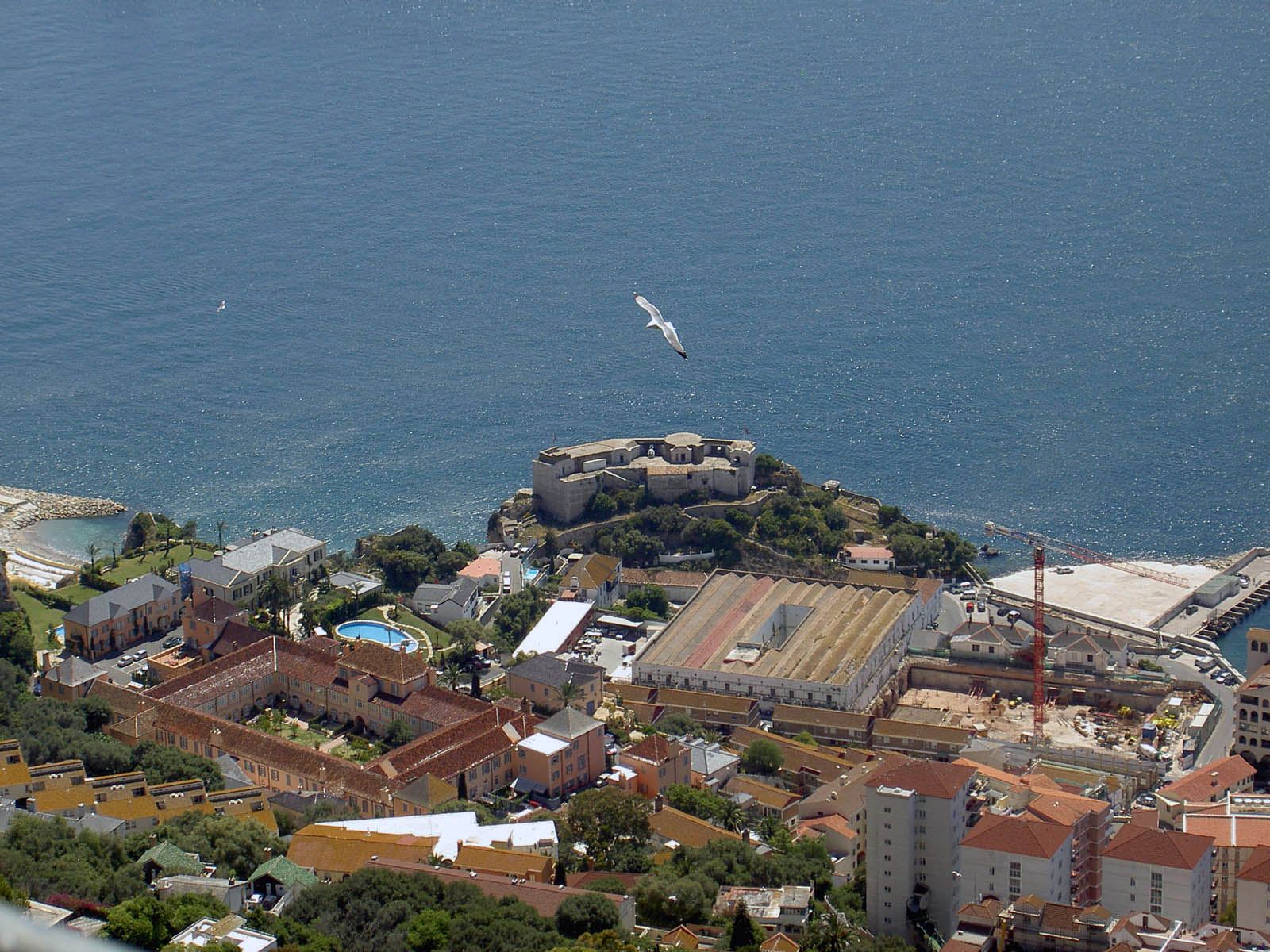
Parson's Lodge Battery (centre), Victualling Yard (centre right), construction site at former Rosia Water Tanks (right), Rosia Cottages (right), former Old Naval Hospital (left), Camp Bay (left).

Rosia Bay is located along the southwestern coast of Gibraltar, the British Overseas Territory at the southern end of the Iberian Peninsula. It represents Gibraltar's only natural harbour, and was formerly known as Rosia Harbour, the site of the previous Rosia Swimming Club. The bay was named after Rosia, a monastery town in northern Italy.

Until 2006, Rosia Bay was the site of the 19th century Victualling Yard complex, which included the Victualling Yard, Rosia Water Tanks, and Rosia Mole. That year, the historic Rosia Water Tanks were demolished by the Government of Gibraltar, despite vocal public opposition, to enable construction of a large building, Nelson's View, which contained affordable housing units. While the Victualling Yard and the Rosia Mole remain intact, the entrance to the Victualling Yard complex is the only portion that has been listed with the Gibraltar Heritage Trust.

The four Rosia Cottages were constructed at Rosia Bay in the 19th century as residences for victualling personnel, immediately to the west of the underground Rosia Water Tanks. In time, the cottages came to be privately owned. After the demolition of the tanks in 2006 and the subsequent construction of the Nelson's View development, the owners of the cottages were left with a large building which towered directly behind their homes. The government eventually agreed to a deal in which four properties, Lancashire House, St. Bernard's House, Suffolk House, and Surrey House, all of them formerly belonging to the Ministry of Defence, were exchanged for the Rosia Cottages. Taxpayers also paid the litigation costs and, for three of the four cottage owners, the cost of relocation.

The early history of the Victualling Yard complex is traced back to the late 18th century. At that time, the dockyard was located at the New Mole, now referred to as the South Mole, and victualling was near the Old Mole, now known as the North Mole. These facilities however, suffered great damage during the Great Siege of Gibraltar due to its proximity to the Spanish land artillery to the north. In 1799, while residing at Rosia Parade in Gibraltar, John Jervis, 1st Earl of St Vincent, Admiral in Charge of the Mediterranean Fleet, recommended that the Royal Navy Victualling Yard be relocated to the Rosia Bay area, just south of the New Mole. In addition to access to the bay, the site had the advantage of the protection afforded by Parson's Lodge Battery. It had the further advantage of being out of range of enemy gunfire from the North Front. Construction of the Rosia Water Tanks began in 1799 and was completed in 1804 by contractor John Maria Boschetti. The entire Victualling Yard complex at Rosia Bay was completed by 1812. It formed part of the Royal Navy base and contained stores of food, water, and clothing in sufficient quantities for a large fleet. The Rosia Mole was the berthing place for the Royal Navy vessels seeking provisions and water from the Victualling Yard complex; it also held coal for the garrison.

== Fortifications ==
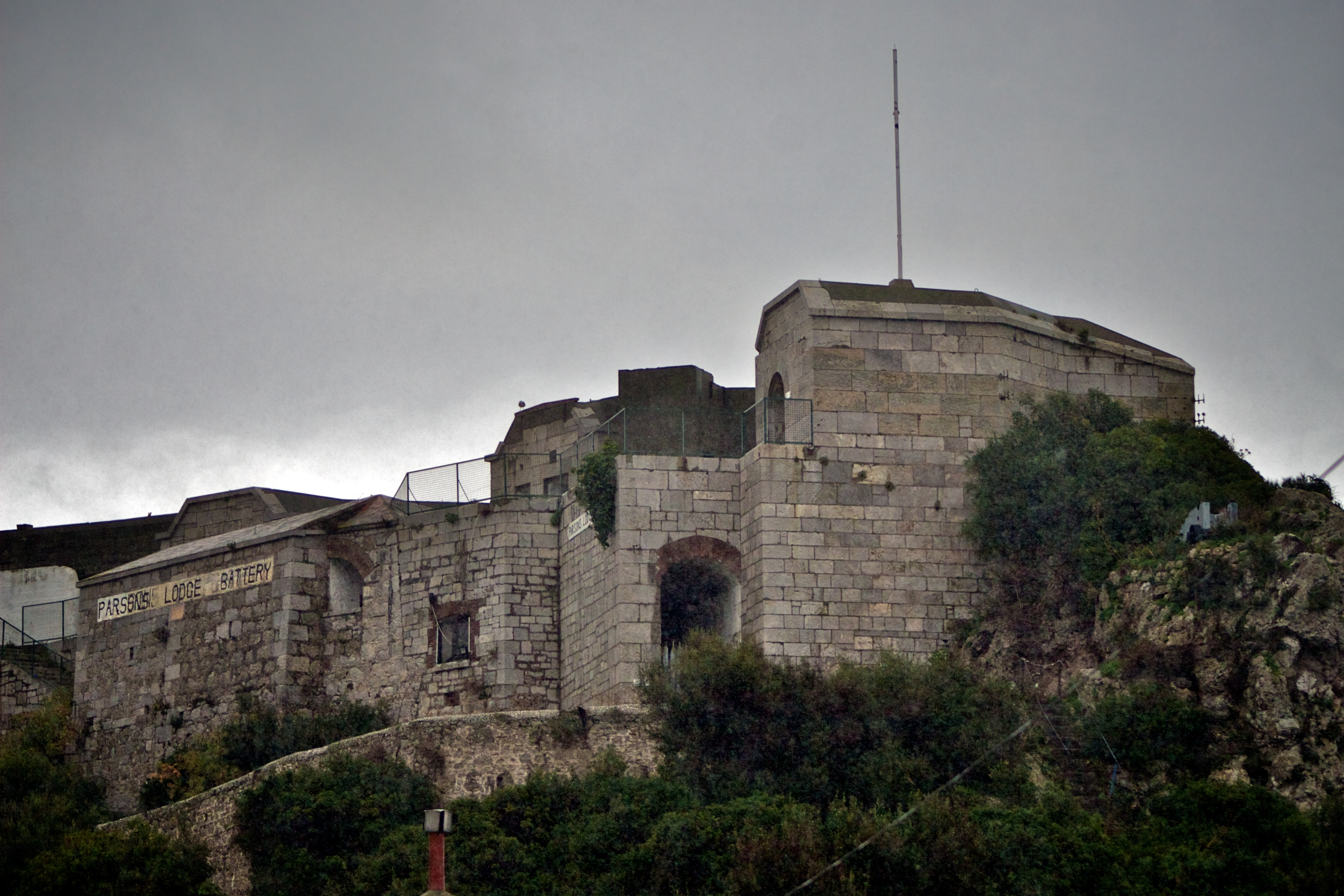
Parson's Lodge Battery

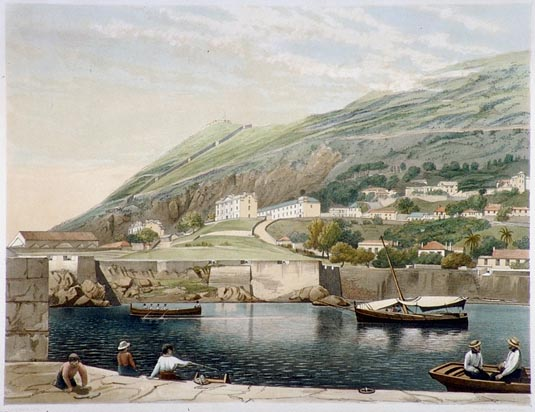
View of South Barracks from Rosia Bay by Thomas Colman Dibdin.

Over the years, the British built gun batteries that overlooked Rosia Bay to protect the harbour from attacking vessels. Parson's Lodge Battery, at the south end of the bay, is the largest of those defences and dates to the 18th century. The battery has a dominant position on a promontory in front of the southwestern corner of the Victualling Yard. The underlying cliffs were scarped by engineers to prevent attackers from climbing them. At one time, the battery housed three 18-ton 10" rifled muzzle-loading guns. It also provided storage for ammunition and living quarters. Parson's Lodge Battery is now under the aegis of the Gibraltar Museum.

At the north end of Rosia Bay is the Napier of Magdala Battery, construction of which was completed in 1883-1884. It was named after Field Marshal Robert Napier, 1st Baron Napier of Magdala, and Governor of Gibraltar from 1876 to 1882. The battery is the site of the 100-ton gun, installed in the late 19th century, and one of the only two remaining in the world. (The other is located at the Rinella Battery in Malta.) The weapon was one of two 100-ton guns that Gibraltar received in the late 19th century. The British installed one at Victoria Battery, named after the queen, and the other at Napier of Magdala Battery. After the gun at Nappier of Magdala burst during firing, the gun at Victoria Battery replaced it. The former Victoria Battery is now the site of the headquarters of Gibraltar's City Fire Brigade.

Gibraltar's 100-ton gun is listed with the Gibraltar Heritage Trust. The defensive wall and batteries at the east side of Rosia Bay, including a pair of rifled muzzle loading guns, are also listed with the trust.

== Vice Admiral Horatio Nelson ==
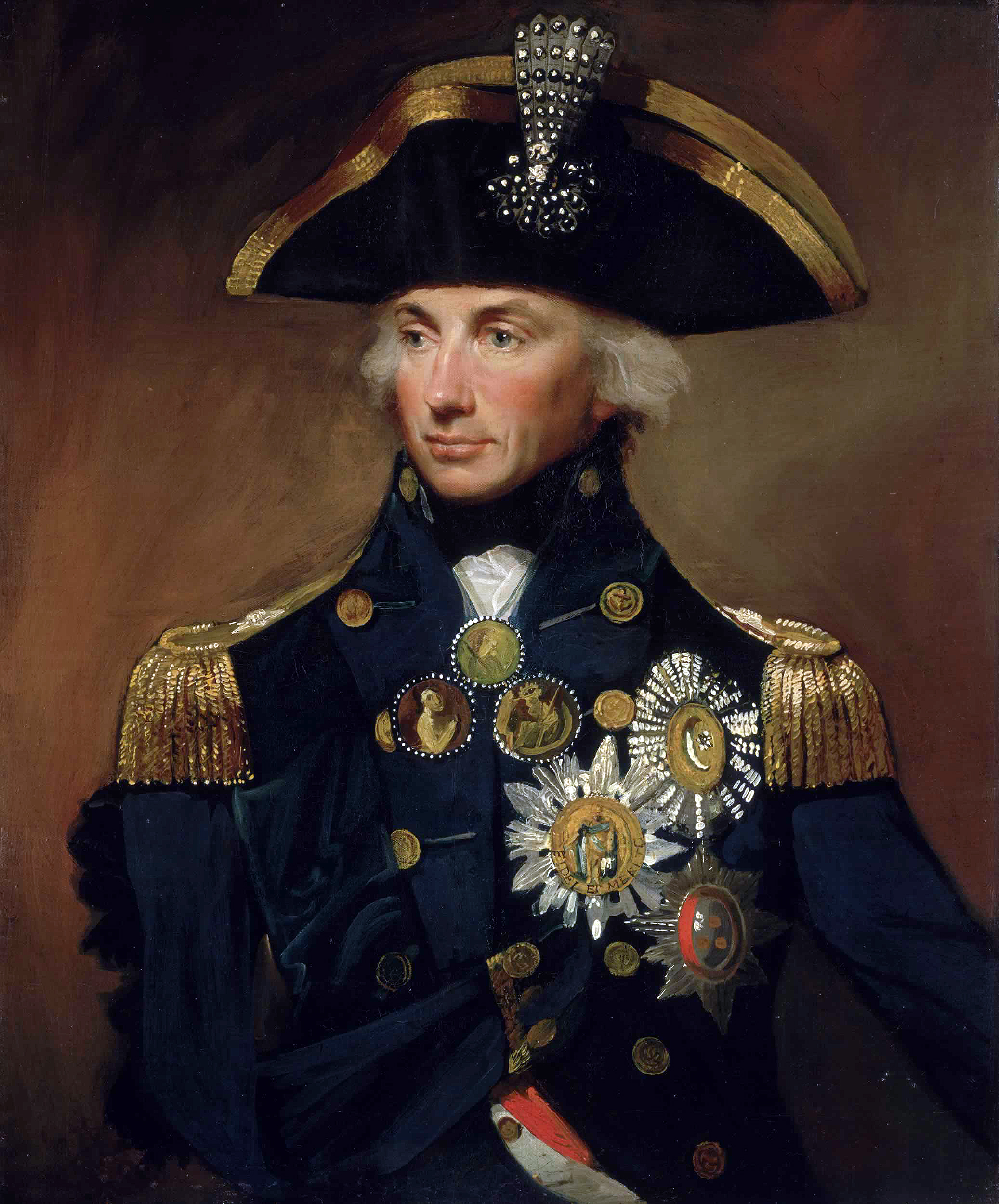
Vice Admiral Horatio Nelson.

The Battle of Trafalgar, on 21 October 1805, was an engagement between the British fleet commanded by Vice Admiral Horatio Nelson and the Franco-Hispanic fleet commanded by Admiral Pierre-Charles Villeneuve. While Britain won the battle, Admiral Nelson died during the engagement. When the British fleet returned to Gibraltar with Nelson's body preserved in a barrel, it was into Rosia Bay, Gibraltar's sole deep water anchorage, that HMS Victory was towed. While denied by the Royal Navy, local lore has it that his body was taken ashore at the bay, for transfer from a barrel of brandy to a barrel of alcohol (spirit of wine), in preparation for the return to the United Kingdom.
