= Victualling Yard, Gibraltar =

Naval victualling facility in Gibraltar

Victualling Yard
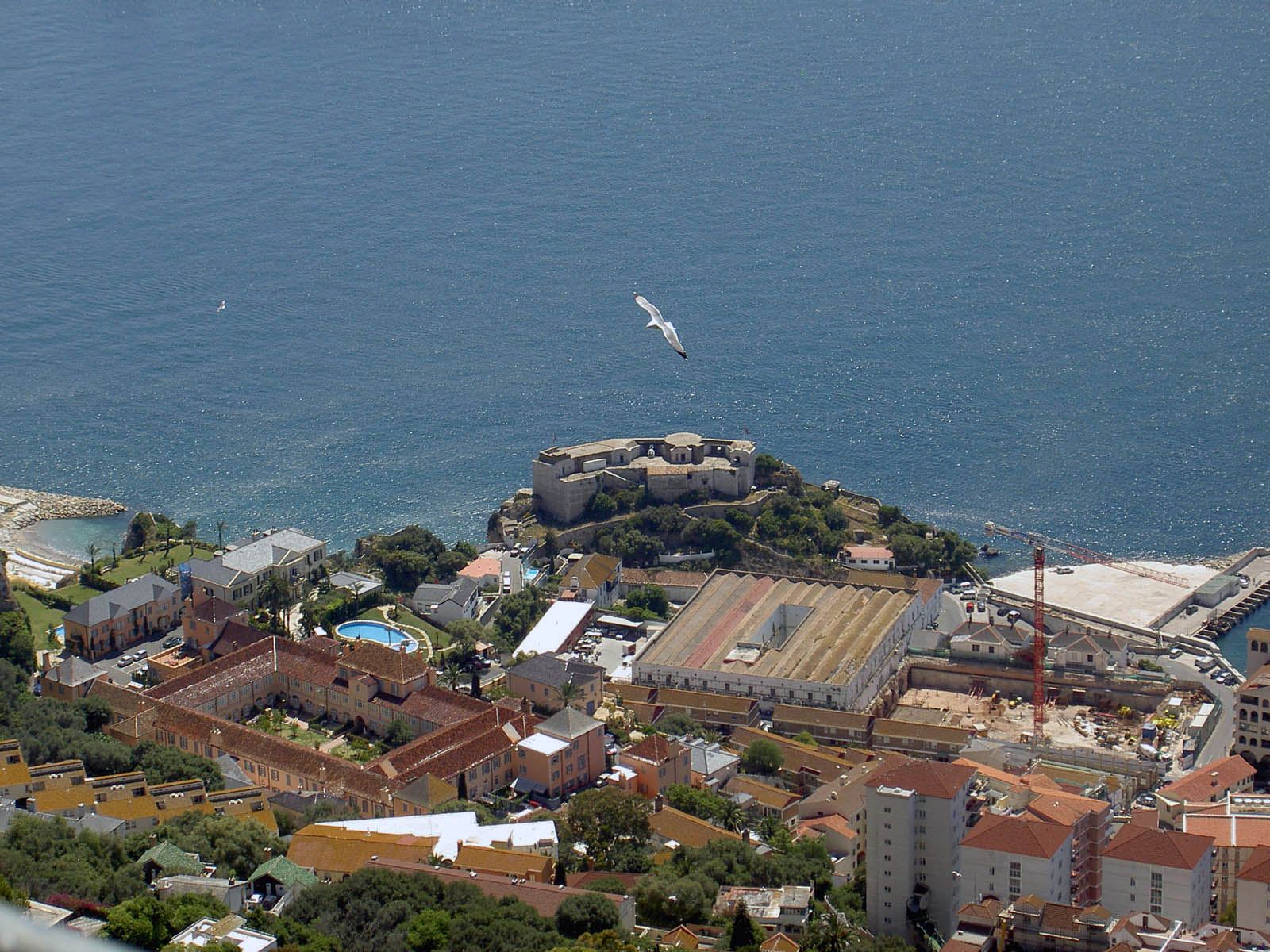
- Victualling Yard (centre right), Parson's Lodge Battery (centre), construction site at former Rosia Water Tanks (right), Rosia Cottages (right), former Old Naval Hospital (left), Camp Bay (left).

- Location within Gibraltar

General information
- Status: Completed
- Type: Naval
- Location: Rosia Bay, Gibraltar
- Coordinates: 36.120756°N 5.351587°W
- Completed: 1812
- Owner: Government of Gibraltar

Height
- Top floor: 1

The Victualling Yard was a victualling facility in the British Overseas Territory of Gibraltar built for supplying Royal Navy ships while anchored at Rosia Bay.

== History ==
The early history of the Victualling Yard complex is traced back to the late 18th century. At that time, the dockyard was located at the New Mole, now referred to as the South Mole, and victualling was near the Old Mole, now known as the North Mole.

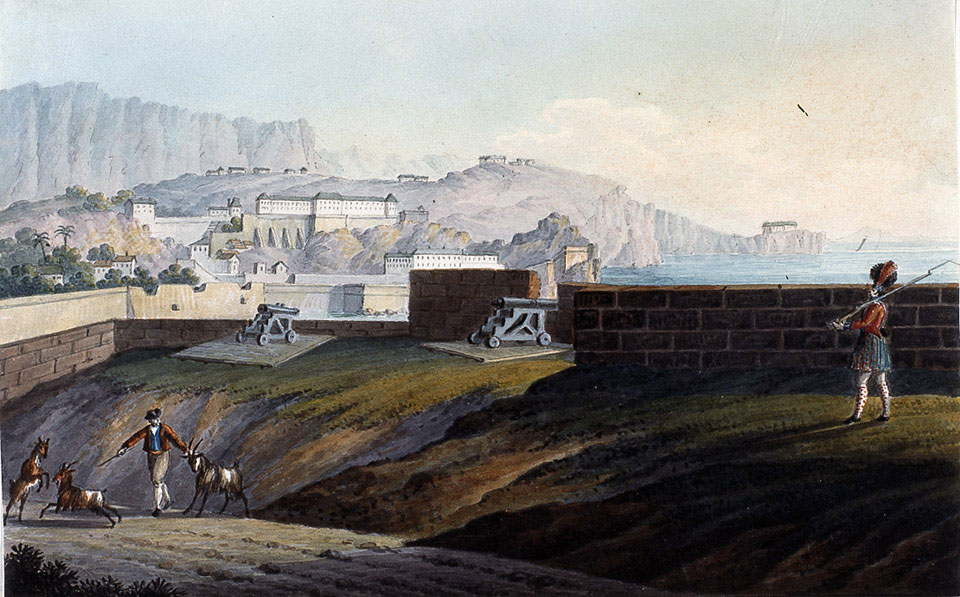
The Naval Stores at Rosia Bay in 1827 by Thomas Staunton St. Clair

These facilities, however, suffered great damage during the Great Siege of Gibraltar due to their proximity to the Spanish land artillery to the north. In 1799, while residing at Rosia Parade in Gibraltar, John Jervis, 1st Earl of St Vincent, Admiral in Charge of the Mediterranean Fleet, recommended that the Royal Navy Victualling Yard be relocated to the Rosia Bay area, just south of the New Mole. Governor O'Hara did not approve of St Vincent's plan as he proposed to finance it by selling the naval stores at Waterport and Irish Town. However, St Vincent won. In addition to access to the bay, the site had the advantage of the protection afforded by Parson's Lodge Battery. It had the further advantage of being out of range of enemy gunfire from the North Front. Construction of the Rosia Water Tanks began in 1799 and was completed in 1804 by the contractor Giovanni Maria Boschetti. The entire Victualling Yard complex at Rosia Bay was completed by 1812. It formed part of the Royal Navy base and contained stores of food, water, and clothing in sufficient quantities for a large fleet. The Rosia Mole was the berthing place for the Royal Navy vessels seeking provisions and water from the Victualling Yard complex; it also held coal for the garrison.

== Conservation ==
The complex was in use as a victualling yard until the 1980s and remained in Ministry of Defence hands until 2004. It was described as 'until recently the best and least altered example of a [RN] victualling depot' outside the British isles; however, the entrance to the Victualling Yard complex is the only portion to be listed with the Gibraltar Heritage Trust. Having taken ownership, the Gibraltar government demolished the unique underground water tanks in 2006, in the face of international opposition.
