= Keightley Way =

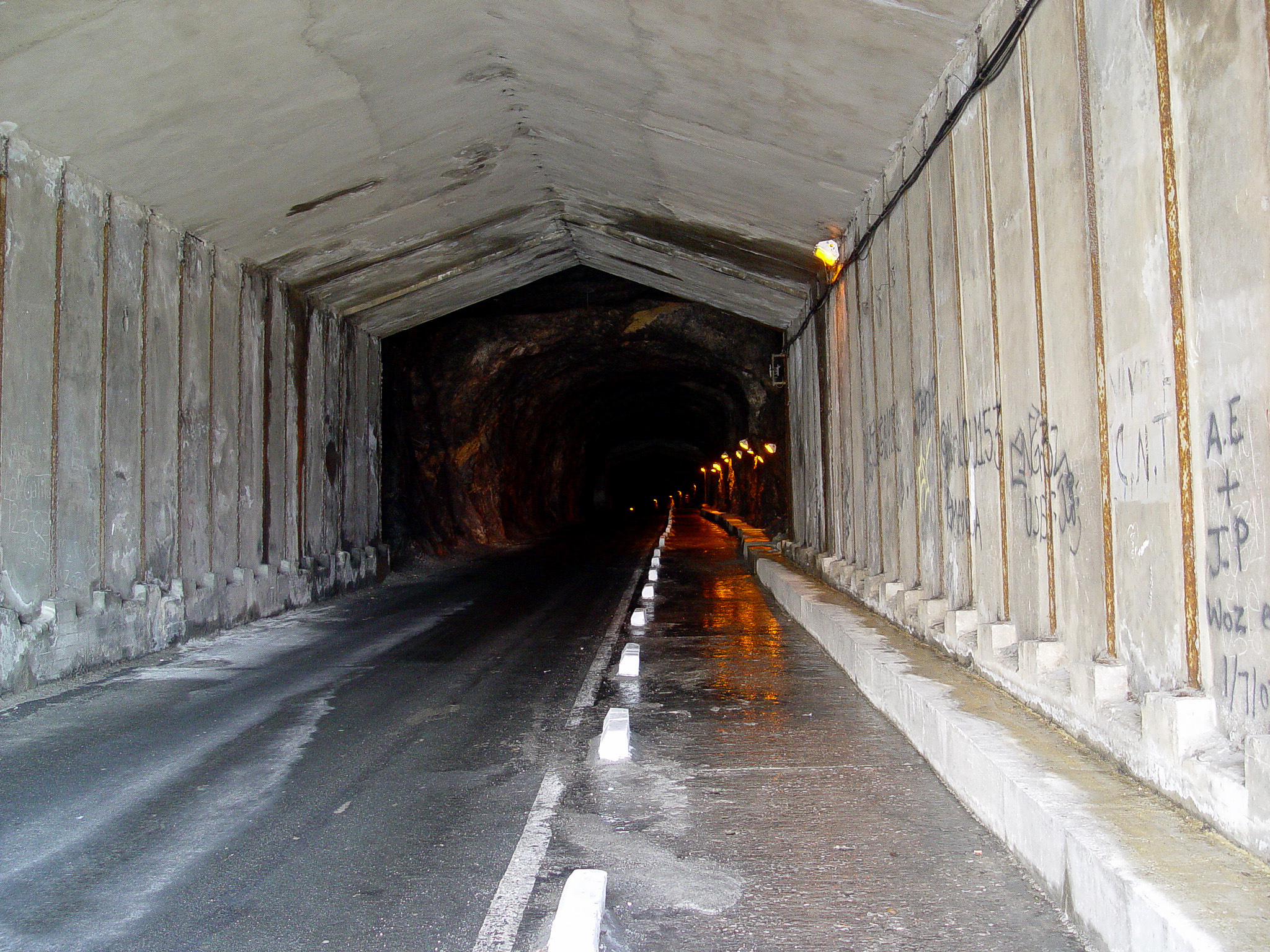
- Northern entrance to Keightley Way
- Interactive map of Keightley Way

Overview
- Location: Gibraltar
- Coordinates: 36.115365°N 5.348594°W
- Status: Open
- Start: Rosia Road
- End: Europa Point

Operation
- Opened: 1960
- Owner: Government of Gibraltar
- Operator: Government of Gibraltar
- Traffic: Automotive and pedestrian
- Character: Public highway
- Toll: Nil

Technical
- Length: 0.412 kilometres (0.256 mi)
- No. of lanes: 1
- Operating speed: 30 kilometres per hour (19 mph)

Keightley Way is a southwestern road and tunnel in the British Overseas Territory of Gibraltar. It connects Rosia Road at Little Bay to Nun's Well at Europa Point. Dug in 1960, it was the last surface tunnel to be built in Gibraltar. The tunnel was designed to take a two lane road and space for pedestrians, although it now only carries one lane of traffic southbound. It was named after General Sir Charles Keightley who was the Governor of Gibraltar at the time.
