= OEM International =

OEM (International) Limited
- Type: Private company
- Industry: Construction; Transport
- Founded: 2005
- Defunct: 2007
- Fate: Liquidation
- Area served: Gibraltar
- Key people: Robert Noonan (chairman); Darren McComb

OEM (International) Limited was a construction company based in Gibraltar. It was associated with a number of unsuccessful housing projects and the purported launch of an airline, Fly Gibraltar, in 2006. The company, which reportedly received £4 million in loans from the Government of Gibraltar, went into liquidation in 2009.

== History ==
In 2006, the company's chairperson, Robert Noonan, reportedly announced a large-scale development project in Gibraltar. Noonan, from County Kerry in Ireland, had been a director of OEM International since August 2005.

In August 2006, OEM International issued a press release stating that they would be creating an airline under the name of "Fly Gibraltar". The owner of OEM International, Robert Noonan, reportedly said he would invest £20m of his money in the venture through the construction company. The proposed low-cost airline was due to be based in Gibraltar, with destinations in the United Kingdom and Ireland. Representatives reportedly stated that flights would initially be operated under the air operator's certificate of Astraeus. While company representatives initially stated that it would commence flying in April 2007, a later announcement said its operation was on hold until 2008. A further announcement, made in June 2007, stated that Fly Gibraltar would not commence any operations due to "insurmountable financial issues" and as it had been "unable to deposit the £10m insurance bond" required with the Civil Aviation Authority (CAA). There is no evidence that the company ever actually contacted either Astraeus or the CAA. At the time, airline industry sources in the UK were reported to have described it as "pie in the sky" and an article in Panorama suggested that it "seemed unbelievable". Representatives of the government of Gibraltar said the promised routes, which were purported to include Dublin, Cork, Birmingham, Bristol, Manchester and London Stansted, would be offered to other airlines.

OEM International were responsible for the construction of several affordable Government of Gibraltar housing projects, including Nelson's View, Cumberland Terraces and Bayview Terraces. In April 2007 the government announced the repossession of the sites, following the failure of OEM International to satisfy the government that they had sufficient funds available to complete the construction of the projects. The construction was taken over by GRP Investments Company Limited a company wholly owned by the Government of Gibraltar.

OEM (International) Limited reportedly entered liquidation in 2009. Loans made to the company by the government, described in a press release from the Chief Minister of Gibraltar's office as "secret loans" comprising tax-payer money, had not been repaid.

== See also ==
- Rosia Water Tanks#Proposed development
