= Camp Bay, Gibraltar =

Beach in the British Overseas Territory of Gibraltar

Coordinates: 36.119°N 5.351°W

Camp Bay (or El Quarry in Llanito) is a small rocky beach in the British Overseas Territory of Gibraltar. It is located off Rosia Road along the territory's west coast overlooking the Bay of Gibraltar. Parson's Lodge Battery overlooks the northern end of the bay.

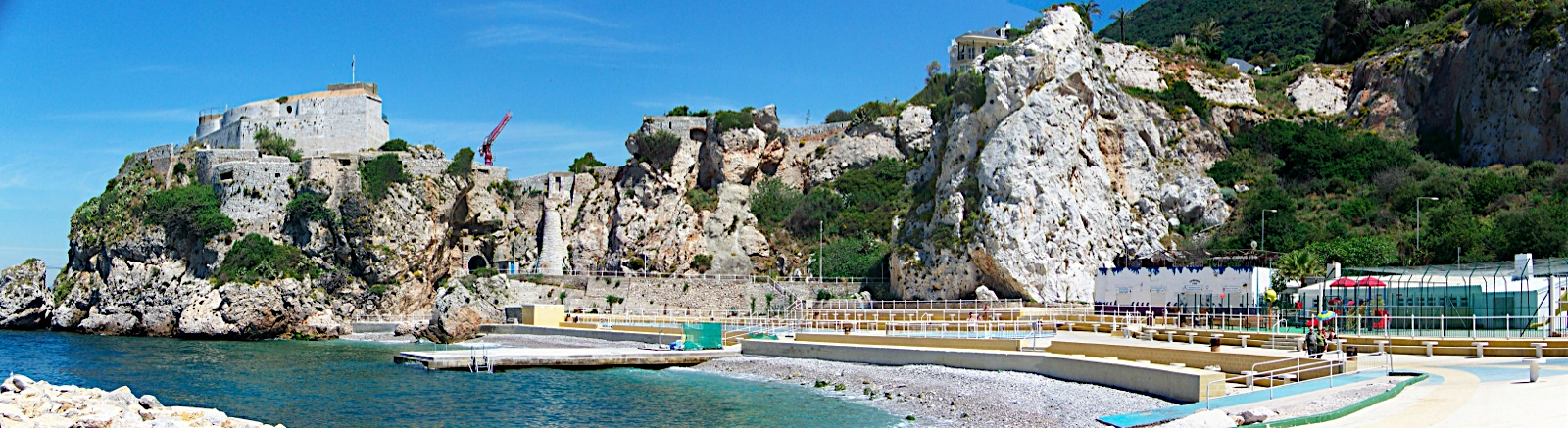
Panoramic view of Camp Bay looking north. Parson's Lodge Battery can be seen in the top left of the image.

== Artificial reef ==
Camp Bay is home to what is claimed to be Europe's first artificial reef. The reef was created by activists who were concerned at the scarcity of marine life. The early experiments of floating out and sinking derelict cars merely demonstrated the power of local storms and currents. A second attempt used ships that were no longer required. Some were vessels that would have been abandoned in deep water, but the activists persuaded people to sink them in shallower waters. Significant donations were floating harbours and the large cable ship known as the 482. These ships now create a haven for marine life and are a destination for thousands of divers each year.
