= Ibrahim-al-Ibrahim Mosque =

Mosque in Gibraltar

- Arabic: مسجد ابراهيم الابراهيم
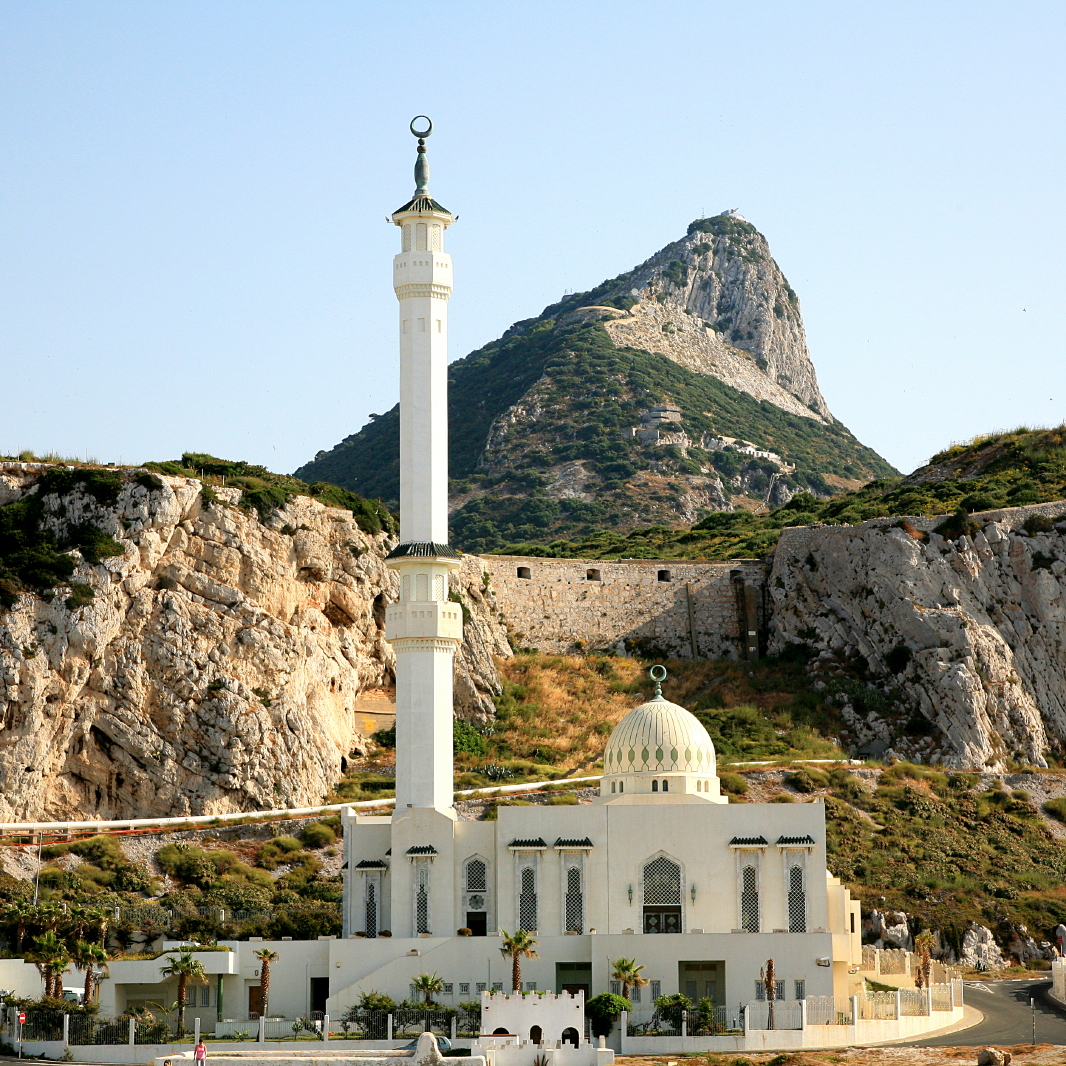
- The mosque, in 2006

- Location of the mosque in Gibraltar

Religion
- Affiliation: Islam
- Ecclesiastical or organizational status: Mosque
- Year consecrated: 1997
- Status: Active

Location
- Location: Europa Point, Gibraltar, British overseas territories
- Country: United Kingdom
- Interactive map of Ibrahim-al-Ibrahim Mosque
- Coordinates: 36°06′43.3″N 5°20′44.2″W

Architecture
- Type: Islamic architecture
- Funded by: Fahd of Saudi Arabia
- Established: 1995
- Completed: 1997
- Construction cost: c. £5 million

Specifications
- Direction of façade: South
- Dome: One
- Minaret: One
- Materials: Marble

The Ibrahim-al-Ibrahim Mosque (Arabic: مسجد ابراهيم الابراهيم), also known as the King Fahd bin Abdulaziz Al Saud Mosque or the Mosque of the Custodian of the Two Holy Mosques, is an Islamic mosque located at Europa Point in the British overseas territory of Gibraltar, a peninsula connected to southern Spain. The mosque faces south towards the Strait of Gibraltar and Morocco, several kilometres (miles) away.

== Overview ==
The building was a gift from King Fahd of Saudi Arabia and took two years to build at a cost of around £5 million. It was officially inaugurated on 8 August 1997. It is the southernmost mosque in continental Europe, and is one of the largest mosques in a non-Muslim country.

The Ibrahim-al-Ibrahim Mosque, also known as the King Fahad Bin Abdulaziz Al Saud Mosque, is one of the most often-visited places in Gibraltar. Its first floor comprises six classrooms, a conference hall, a library, a kitchen, bathroom, housing for the caretaker, morgue, offices for administration purposes, and the Imam's house.

The main prayer hall is located on the second floor of the building. The ceiling is made up of nine solid brass chandeliers, that cannot be missed when entering the praying area. One of the chandeliers is hung from the enormous dome that is at an extreme height. The walls are imported marble stretching across the whole mosque. A women's prayer hall is located on the lower level, along with a nursery, that overlooks the main prayer hall. The Ibrahim-al-Ibrahim Mosque is used on a daily basis by Muslims living in Gibraltar and is open to the public.

=== Features ===
The mosque complex also contains a school, library, and lecture hall. It is the only purpose-built mosque in Gibraltar to serve the Muslims in the territory who, as of the 2001 Census of Gibraltar, numbered over 1,000; or approximately 4 per cent of Gibraltar's total population.

== See also ==
- List of mosques in Gibraltar
