= Parson's Lodge Battery =

Gun battery on the Rock of Gibraltar

- Part of Fortifications of Gibraltar
- Rosia Bay, Gibraltar
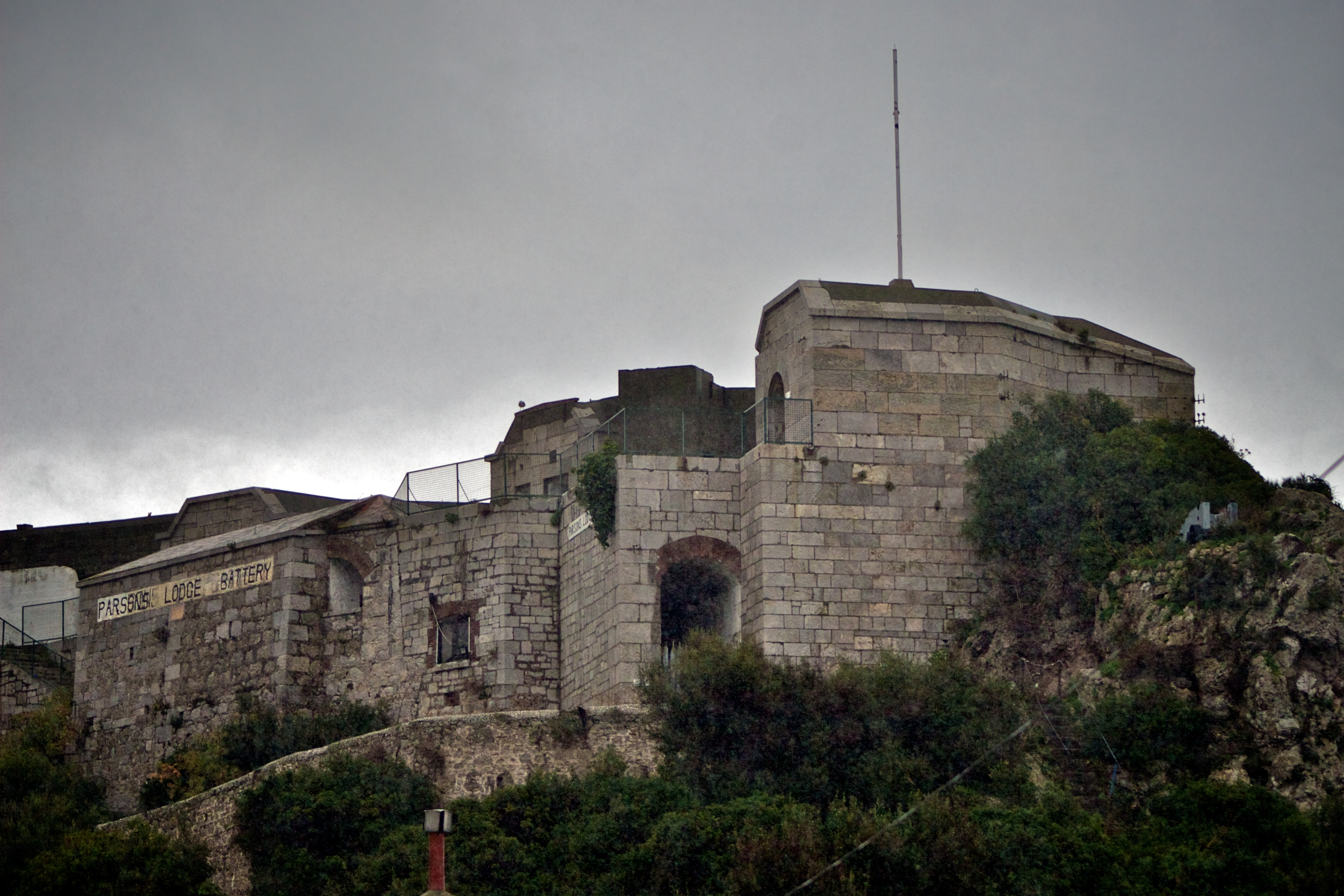
- Parson's Lodge Battery, Gibraltar

Site information
- Type: Coastal battery
- Owner: Government of Gibraltar
- Controlled by: Gibraltar
- Open to the public: No
- Condition: Good

Location
- Location of Parson's Lodge Battery within Gibraltar.
- Coordinates: 36.120163°N 5.352052°W

Site history
- Built by: British Government
- Materials: Limestone

Parson's Lodge Battery is a coastal battery and fort in the British Overseas Territory of Gibraltar.

== History ==
The Moors had been in Gibraltar, and the Spanish had occupied The Rock for over 250 years. In 1704, the British took possession and, by 1720, they had installed a pair each of 18-pounder (8.1 kg) and 12-pounder (5.4 kg) guns. By 1744, there were over 20 guns around Rosia Bay. Parson's Lodge Battery was originally named the 9th Rosia Battery. The Parson's Lodge name is first recorded in 1761 and reputedly refers to the dwelling of the parson of a church and hermitage named St. John the Green.

In early October 1840, Major-General John Thomas Jones arrived to inspect the defences of Gibraltar. He remained on the rock until June 1841, when he returned to England. Jones advised on improvements for Parson's Lodge Battery, which caused eight guns to be installed in 1842.

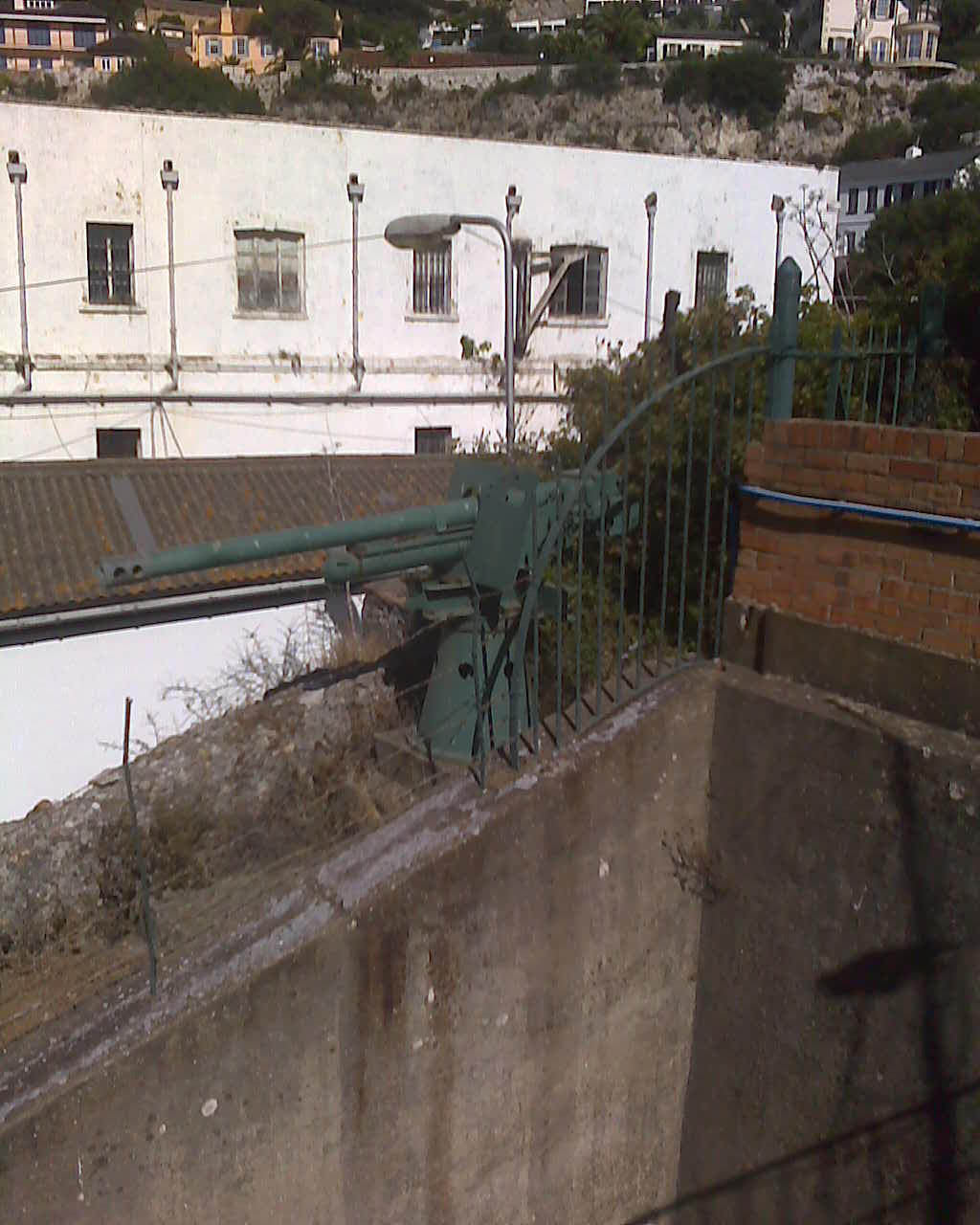
A Hotchkiss 6-pounder at the battery

At the height of its military importance, the battery had three 10-inch (250 mm) rifled muzzle-loading guns that guarded the approaches to Rosia Bay, which is the only natural harbour on The Rock. The guns were installed in 1884. These guns fired a 400-pound (180 kg) shell over two and a half miles (4.0 km). Gibraltar Shields, which consisted of thick layers of iron around thick teak planks, protected the guns. The shields later used bolts that were also protected against abnormal loads as they included wooden bushes and had corners filed away to prevent them being snapped when resisting an enemy's shell.

Beneath the fort lies a narrow tunnel that at one time housed a one-metre gauge railway but which is now a road tunnel. The tunnel was one of two originally created to take large quantities of quarried stone from Camp Bay to the harbour's South Mole when it was constructed in the 1880s.

The battery was used during both World Wars and, in 1941 it had anti-aircraft and anti-tank guns as well as anti-aircraft searchlights installed.

=== Post-war developments ===
The military abandoned the battery in the 1950s. Gibraltar Heritage Trust extensively restored the battery in 1994, whose grounds now include a field centre belonging to the Gibraltar Museum.

There is a wall that goes from Parson's Lodge Battery to Buena Vista Barracks. This wall and the Machicouli Gallery above Camp Bay are both List A items and are protected by the Gibraltar Heritage Trust Act, which transferred these and many other assets to the Gibraltar Heritage Trust in 1989.

== Guide to the battery ==
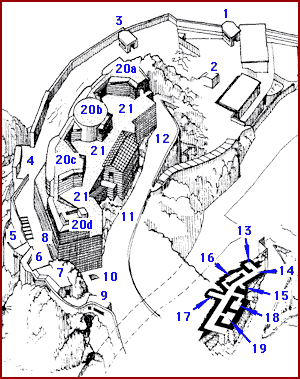
Detailed plan of Parson's Lodge Battery.

=== [1] and [3] - Coast artillery searchlights ===
From 1898 to 1956 these buildings housed 90 cm searchlights, which were intended to illuminate enemy ships. Each light was 200 million candlepower and a concentrated "pencil" (3-degree) beam could be projected 5,000 yards (4,600 m).

=== [2] - Underground 6 pounder gun position ===
Known as Lower Parsons. From April 1941 to the end of World War II (WWII), a 6 pdr. gun was positioned here to cover the landing places in Rosia Bay. It fired a 6 pounds (2.7 kg) shell 4,000 yards (2.3 mi; 3.7 km).

=== [4] - 18th-century gun position ===
From about 1725 to 1840 (when a larger battery was built to the left) a smooth bore gun was positioned here to cover Camp Bay. At one stage it was a 24-pounder (11 kg) firing a solid round shot, 2,000 yards (1.1 mi; 1.8 km).

=== [5] & [7] - 6 pounder gun positions ===
These guns were placed for use against enemy forces attempting to land in Camp and Little Bays. They were mounted on concrete blocks as opposed to the pedestal mounting in 2 above. The threshold to position 7 records that it was completed on Christmas Eve 1941 by the Somerset Light Infantry.

=== [6] - 18th-century gun position ===
As described in 4 above. At one stage, this gun would have been a 9-pounder (4 kg) firing a shot of that weight 1,400 yards (0.80 mi; 1.3 km).

=== [8] - Personnel Shelter ===
There were several of these shelters at Parson's Lodge, providing cover for all personnel not actually manning fire positions. They were known as "elephant shelters" from the shape of the corrugated iron which formed the basis of their construction.

=== [9] - Medium machine gun (MMG) position ===
This fire position was occupied by a Vickers Medium Machine Gun which was designed to fire .303" (7.7 mm) ammunition, the same bore as a service rifle, at a rate of 500 rounds per minute. The flanking positions here were manned by rifle men armed with .303 short magazine Lee–Enfields (SMLE's).

=== [10] - Shaft To underground defensive position ===
This contained two MMGs and two SMLE apertures in the cliff face overlooking possible enemy landing areas in Camp and Little Bays.

=== [11] - Admiralty boundary marker ===
The wall in which this stone is set marks the physical boundary between this Royal Artillery Battery and the Royal Naval Victualling Yard, built in 1808.

=== [12] - Battery ===
This large limestone construction replaced its predecessors (see relic to the right) about 1842 in accordance with recommendations of Major-General John Thomas Jones, and was surmounted, at the time, by eight guns. By 1873, the battery had been adapted to take 3 x 18 ton 10" RML guns. The corridor in front serviced the latter.

=== [13] & [19] - Shell store ===
400 lb (180 kg) 10" (254 mm) solid armour piercing projectiles were stored here. At one stage position 19 was a "side arms store" - in lay parlance, a tool shed.

=== [14] - Lighting passage ===
Stringent precautions were taken to prevent accidental detonation in the cartridge stores. These included "spark free" copper fittings, rope shoes and the obvious measure of lighting magazines through plate glass fronted passages or niches.

=== [15] - Lamp room ===
The oil lamps were stored and serviced in this room.

=== [16] & [18] - Cartridge store ===
There were two types of cartridge 44 lb. (20 kg) and 70 lb (32 kg) contained in bags and tins.

=== [17] - Cartridge hoist ===
At the end of this corridor (and in 12 above) was an apparatus for hoisting cartridges and shells to the guns above.

=== [20] - Expense magazines ===
Cartridges and Projectiles were stored, ready for use, in these four limestone buildings.

1. The northernmost (No 1 in RA terms) contained hoist apparatus for lifting shells from the storage magazines below. It was surmounted, in World War II, by a Bren gun position - since removed.
2. No 2 also had a hoist (for cartridges) and was surmounted from 1963 until 1956 with a 90 cm anti aircraft searchlight (AASL). This AASL was 200 million condlepower and could project a concentrated beam 20,000 feet (3.8 miles: 6 km).
3. No 3 was surmounted by a 3" (76 mm) anti aircraft rocket projector, installed on 16 October 1942 and since removed.
4. No 4 is still surmounted by a Bofors 40mm light anti aircraft gun position, completed on 16 November 1941.

=== [21] - RML gun positions ===
From 1873 to about 1892, 10" (254 mm) rifled muzzle loading guns were positioned in each of the three shielded embrasures. Made in Woolwich, they fired a 400 lb (180 kg) projectiles to a range of about 4,500 yards (2.6 miles: 4 km). The gun fired and was protected, from seabourne attack, by a sandwich of armour plate and tyeack, specially invented for use here and known universally as "Gibraltar Shields".
