= Gibraltar Heritage Trust =

- Gibraltar Heritage Trust's logo.
- Formation: 1 May 1989
- Type: Charitable organisation
- Purpose: Heritage conservation
- Headquarters: The Main Guard, 13 John Mackintosh Square
- Location: Gibraltar
- Coordinates: 36.1406°N 5.3541°W
- Region served: Gibraltar
- Official language: English
- Chief executive officer: Claire Montado
- Website: www.gibraltarheritagetrust.org.gi

The Gibraltar Heritage Trust is a non-profit charity established by statute on 1 May 1989 to preserve and promote the cultural natural heritage of the British Overseas Territory of Gibraltar.

== Funding and responsibilities ==
The Trust collaborates with the Government of Gibraltar and with private organisations and individuals to preserve and promote Gibraltar's heritage for cultural, educational and tourism purposes. The Trust is funded through fees from exhibitions, a portion of ticket sales for access to listed properties managed by the Gibraltar Tourist Board and from donations. Although the Gibraltar Museum is owned and operated by the government, the Trust has an advisory role and assists in expanding the collection.

== Sites ==
The Trust maintains a list of historically important buildings and structures, and gives advice on their preservation and restoration. With Gibraltar's long history as a garrison town and naval base, most of the listed structures are military, including defensive walls, bastions and batteries. However, the Trust also covers natural attractions and civilian structures such as caves and churches.

Some of the tourist sites for which the Trust coordinates conservation and development lie on the high slopes of The Rock in the Upper Rock Nature Reserve. These include O'Hara's Battery, the 100 ton gun at Napier of Magdala Battery, the Military Heritage Centre at Princess Caroline's Battery and the Parson's Lodge Battery. In the late 1990s the trust arranged for the restoration of Parson's Lodge Battery, which in 1884 had three 10 inches (250 mm) muzzled loading rifled guns. The Trust operates the coastal fort, which is open to the public, with examples of artillery from different periods.
