= Sandpit (disambiguation) =

A sandpit is a low, wide container or shallow depression filled with soft (beach) sand in which children can play.

Sandpit may also refer to:

== Places ==
- Sandpit, County Louth, a village in Ireland
- The Sandpit, an area of Horsell Common, Surrey, England
- Sandpits, a Major Residential Area in Westside, Gibraltar

== Music ==
- "Sandpit", a 1992 song by Curve from Doppelgänger
- "Sandpit", a 2019 song by Scorcher

== Books and plays ==
- The Sandpit: Womensis, a 1990 play by K. S. Maniam
- "The Sandpit", a poem in the 1984 collection Station Island by Seamus Heaney
- The Sandpit, a 2020 novel by Nicholas Shakespeare

== Other uses ==
- Sandpit (horse) (1989–2003), a Brazilian Thoroughbred racehorse
- Wollongong Entertainment Centre or The Sandpit
- Sand pit, an open-pit sand mine
- The Sandpit, a painting by Willem de Zwart
- O Areal or The Sandpit, a 2008 documentary by Sebastián Sepúlveda

== See also ==
- Quarry, an open-pit mine used for excavating various materials, including sand
- Sandbox (disambiguation)
- Sandspit (disambiguation)
