= Gibraltar Diamond Jubilee Flotilla =

2012 parade of vessels

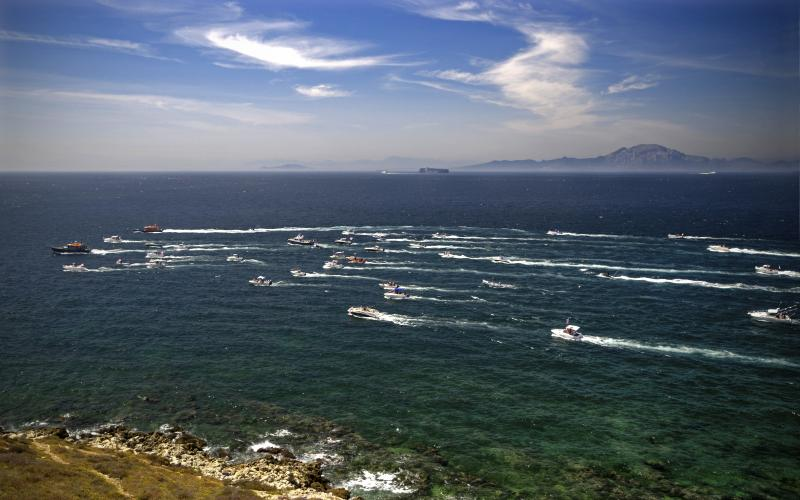
- A flotilla of more than 150 boats sailing around Gibraltar's Europa Point to commemorate the Queen's Diamond Jubilee
- Date: 4 June 2012
- Location: Gibraltar
- Type: National
- Theme: Diamond Jubilee of Elizabeth II

The Gibraltar Diamond Jubilee Flotilla, inspired by the Thames Diamond Jubilee Pageant held in England the previous day, celebrated the Queen's sixty years of reign. The parade of vessels around the British Overseas Territory of Gibraltar on 4 June 2012 was one of numerous events scheduled that year in honour of the Diamond Jubilee of Elizabeth II. The flotilla was hosted by Ocean Village Marina, a marina north of Gibraltar Harbour, on the Westside of Gibraltar. Participation in the event exceeded expectations, with 161 vessels in the flotilla.

== Inspiration ==
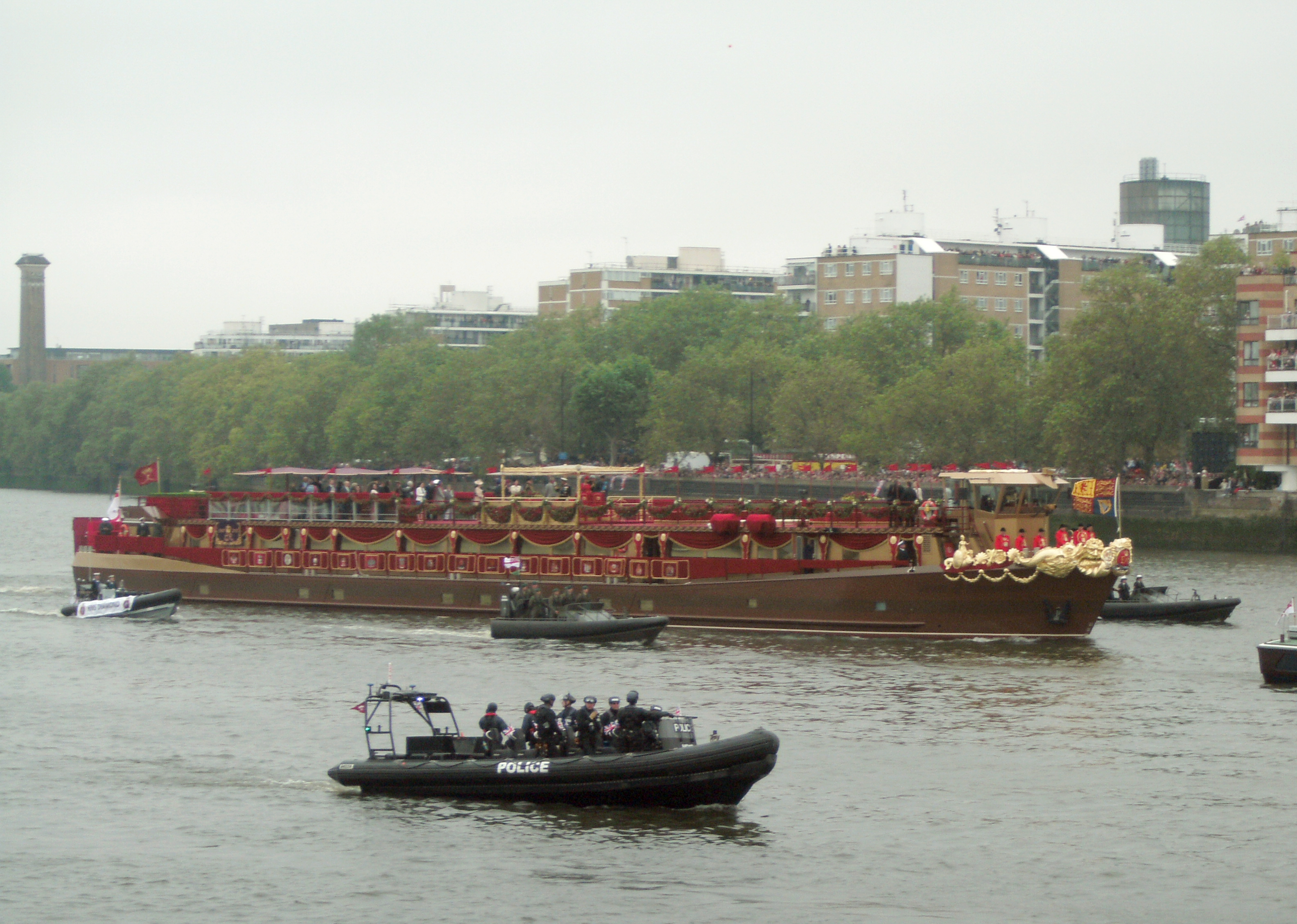
The Spirit of Chartwell at the Thames Diamond Jubilee Pageant on 3 June 2012

The Gibraltar Diamond Jubilee Flotilla, celebrating Queen Elizabeth's sixty years of reign, was inspired by the event that was scheduled for 3 June 2012 on the River Thames in London, England. On that Sunday, more than 1,000 vessels assembled in a flotilla, the Thames Diamond Jubilee Pageant. Despite the inclement weather, throngs of spectators congregated along the bridges and banks of the Thames to witness the seven mile flotilla that extended from Battersea to Tower Bridge. Many also watched the event that was televised on giant screens across the country. The star of the flotilla was the Royal Barge, the Spirit of Chartwell, which was festooned with numerous flowers. Aboard the vessel were Queen Elizabeth; Prince Philip, Duke of Edinburgh; Charles, Prince of Wales; his wife Camilla, Duchess of Cornwall; Prince William, Duke of Cambridge; his wife Catherine, Duchess of Cambridge; and Prince Harry. The festivities ended with fireworks from Tower Bridge, and the National Anthem performed by the Royal College of Music Chamber Choir and the London Philharmonic Orchestra. The flotilla also represented the first public event of the Queen Elizabeth Diamond Jubilee Trust. The goal of the trust is fundraising for worthy causes in the United Kingdom and the Commonwealth, particularly those that benefit the young.

== Planning ==
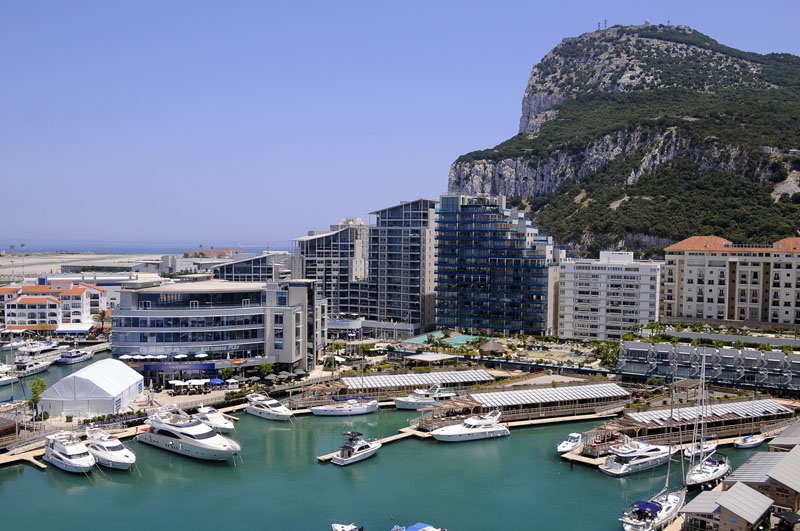
Ocean Village Marina, host of the Gibraltar Diamond Jubilee Flotilla

The proposal for a local flotilla to celebrate the Diamond Jubilee originated at the Ocean Village Marina in the British Overseas Territory of Gibraltar. The idea was met with a positive response from boat owners at the marina just north of Gibraltar Harbour, and the Government of Gibraltar was supportive as well. The flotilla was one of numerous events scheduled in honour of the Queen. The plan was for a mid-morning briefing of skippers, followed by a military re-enactment. Also planned were addresses by the Minister for Culture and the Governor of Gibraltar, and a bagpipe recital, with the minister then joining the parade. It was anticipated that the flotilla would be led by HMS Scimitar of the Royal Navy. The flotilla was to leave the marina at noon on 4 June 2012, parading from the west side of the runway of Gibraltar International Airport, past Europa Point, to the east side of the runway. At that point, the vessels would turn around for the return trip. Ros Astengo, the event organiser at Ocean Village, the resort which incorporates two marinas, Ocean Village Marina and Marina Bay, indicated that, in addition to the flotilla "with all manner of vessels dressed in streamers and Union Jacks," the resort was "encouraging as much onshore support as possible with horn-tooting and flag-waving most welcome." She further noted that the resort's restaurants and bars would be featuring special meals and drinks and that there would be "a live band and DJ chill-out music in the evening." At sunset, the aerobeacon on top of the Rock of Gibraltar would be lit. Those who didn't own a vessel were requested to consider the possibility of chartering a yacht. The host of the event aspired to have the participation of one hundred vessels in the flotilla.

== Flotilla ==
Route of the flotilla from west side of runway past Europa Point to Catalan Bay, and back

On Monday, 4 June 2012, 161 vessels assembled at the Ocean Village Marina.

Small boats were at the front of the parade, followed by power boats more than 9 metres (30 ft) in length, and, last, sailboats. The General Elliot, a vessel of the Gibraltar Port Authority, led the Gibraltar Diamond Jubilee Flotilla, and was supported by other official vessels. After navigating the Bay of Gibraltar and its assortment of commercial vessels, the flotilla paraded south past Europa Point, where spectators had congregated. Upon reaching Catalan Bay, south of the airport runway and Eastern Beach, the participants in the flotilla greeted spectators on the beach and turned around for the return trip to the marina. A number of participants were passengers on chartered boats. The festivities continued that day at Ocean Village, and included a crew party at the resort's champagne bar. At sunset, the Jubilee Beacon was lit by Kaiane Aldorino, former Miss World.
