= Ocean Village =

Ocean Village may refer to:

== Places ==
- Ocean Village, Southampton, an area of Southampton, United Kingdom
- Ocean Village, Gibraltar, an area of Gibraltar
- Ocean Village Marina, Gibraltar, a marina in Gibraltar

== Other ==
- Ocean Village (company), a defunct cruise liner company based in Southampton, United Kingdom
- Ocean Village, a former name of the cruise ship MV Pacific Pearl
- Ocean Village Two, a former name of the cruise ship Pacific Jewel
