= King's Chapel, Gibraltar =

King's Chapel
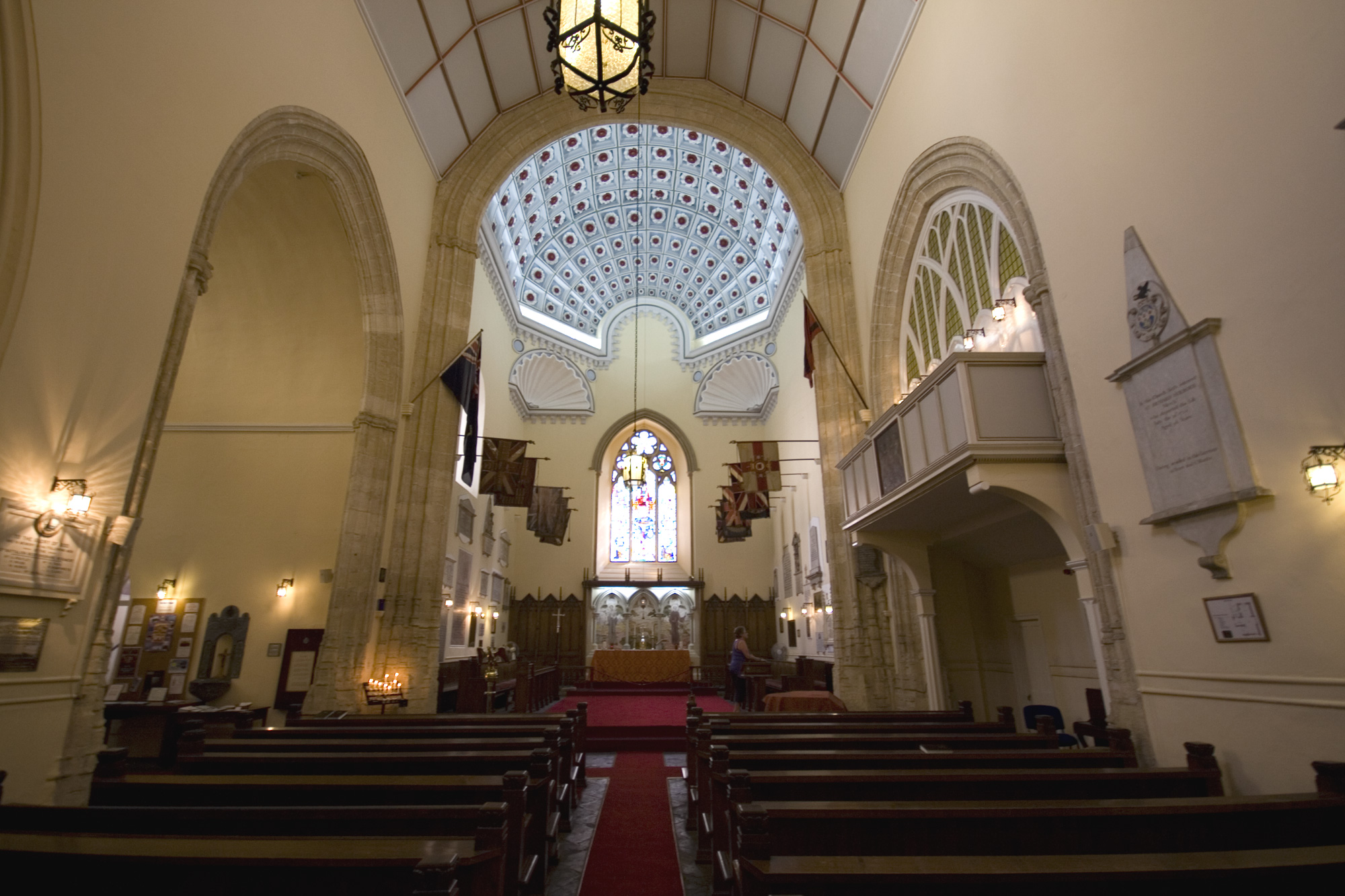
- Interior of the King's Chapel, Gibraltar
- King's Chapel
- 36.13727°N 5.353319°W
- Location: Main Street
- Country: Gibraltar
- Denomination: Church of England
- Previous denomination: Catholic Church (1530s-1728)

History
- Status: Chapel
- Founded: 1530s
- Consecrated: 1530s (RC); 1728 (CoE)

Architecture
- Functional status: Active
- Architect: Various
- Architectural type: Mixed
- Style: Mixed

The King's Chapel is a small chapel in the British Overseas Territory of Gibraltar. It is located at the southern end of Main Street and adjoins the Governor of Gibraltar's residence, The Convent. What nowadays is King's Chapel was the first purpose-built church to be constructed in Gibraltar. Originally part of a Franciscan friary, the chapel was built in the 1530s but was given to the Church of England by the British after the capture of Gibraltar in 1704. It was badly damaged in the late 18th century during the Great Siege of Gibraltar and in the explosion of an ammunition ship in Gibraltar harbour in 1951, but was restored on both occasions. From 1844 to 1990 it served as the principal church of the British Army in Gibraltar; since then it has been used by all three services of the British Armed Forces.

== History ==
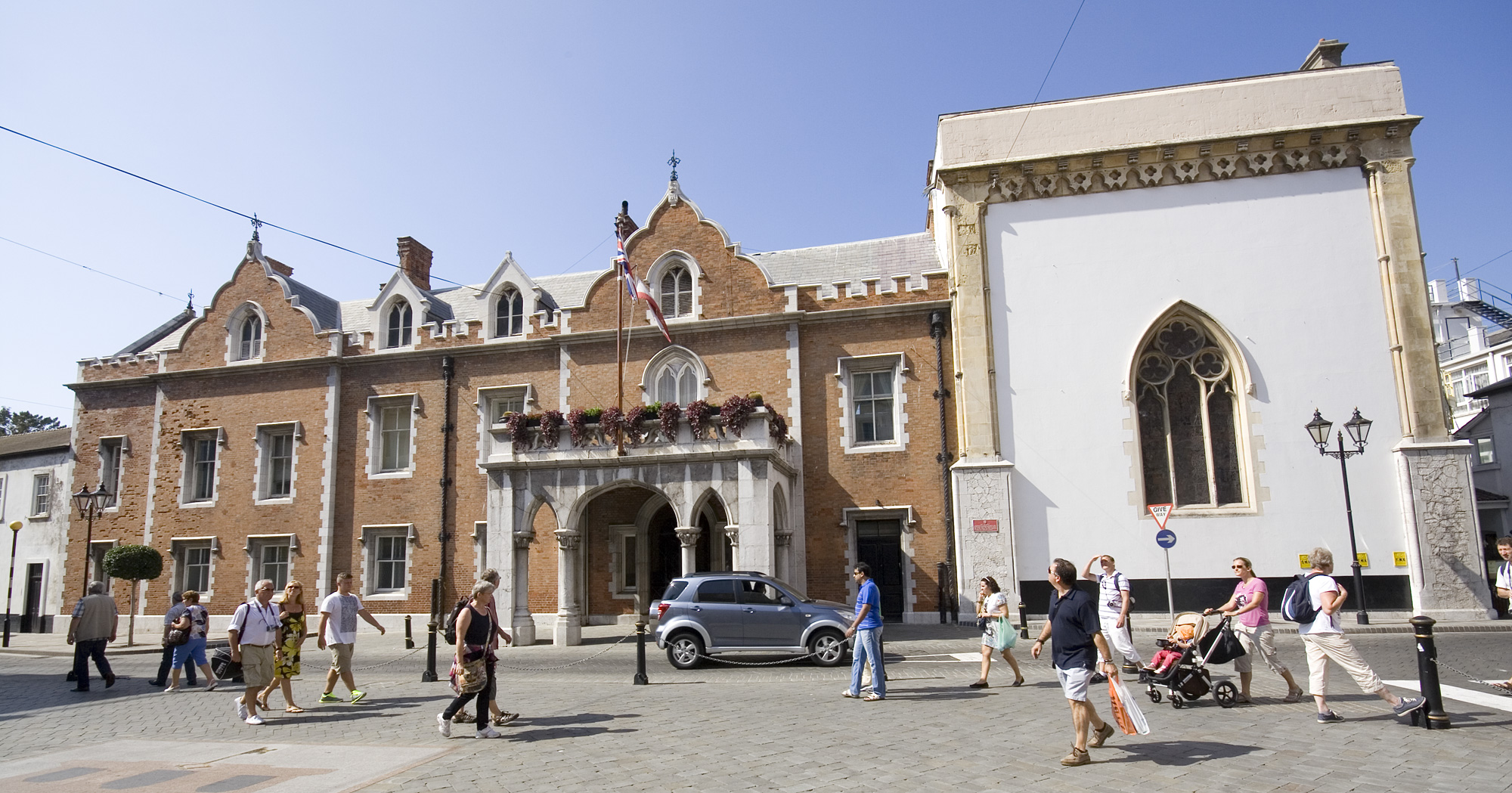
View of the exterior of The Convent and the King's Chapel (right)

Mark Jackson, current Chaplain of the King's Chapel talks about its history.

After Castile captured Gibraltar from the Moors in 1462, friars from the Franciscan order established a presence in the city and constructed a friary and church there. Although two other churches already existed – the Cathedral of St. Mary the Crowned and the Shrine of Our Lady of Europe – these had originally been established as mosques and had been converted into Christian churches by the Spanish. The Franciscans' church, next door to the friary, was thus the first wholly new church to be built in Gibraltar.

In 1704, a combined force from Great Britain and the Dutch Republic captured Gibraltar during the War of the Spanish Succession. The newly installed British Governor took over the friary, known as The Convent, as his official residence (for which purpose it is still used today). The Franciscan church was handed over to the Church of England and was renamed as "The King's Chapel". It was the only religious institution to remain open for services in Gibraltar following the conquest of the city. Francis Carter wrote in 1771: "The Church of the Convent is kept open for Divine Service, and the only one in the town, all other chapels and places of worship having been turned into storehouses to the great scandal of the Spanish and inconvenience of the Protestants." Baptisms were registered there from 1769, marriages from 1771 and burials from 1780, though a regular marriage register was not kept until 1794.

The chapel was badly affected by the Great Siege of Gibraltar (1779–83). Like many other brick or stone buildings in the city, it was pressed into military service to shelter troops and stores. The Spanish bombardment of Gibraltar caused widespread destruction, and the chapel was not spared; its western end and south transept were destroyed by enemy fire. They were rebuilt after the end of the siege but not in their original forms. The western end of the church and south transept were incorporated into the Governor's residence; the former became the Governor's ballroom and music room, while the transept became the site of the residence's main staircase. The present-day chapel consists of only the eastern half of the original church. The truncated nave originally stretched 61 feet (19 m) beyond where it now ends. Before the bombardment began the chapel also lost its belfry, which was pulled down in September 1779 to deny the Spanish gunners an aiming point. The event was recorded in one resident's diary for 19 September 1779: "The cupola of the White Convent was taken down, also the arch and upper part of the Governor's Church." The chapel's bell was not returned until as late as 1995.

The chapel appears to have been reopened for use in 1788, as recorded in a Garrison Order of that year. The Governor, his staff and other civilians worshipped there each Sunday, with a military band providing music to accompany the singing. The chapel was too small to accommodate the rest of the garrison, who held a Church Parade Service in the open air in what is now John Mackintosh Square. By the 1820s the chapel was too small to accommodate the growing civilian Anglican community of Gibraltar. Andrew Bigelow attended a service there in 1827, along with "the Governor and suite, and such of the fashionable gentry within the garrison, and officers not on duty who may feel disposed to attend". He described the building as "quite an ordinary accommodation" and commented:

The plainness of its walls and accompaniments, with the paucity of worshippers who usually convene there, occasions severe strictures on the genius of Protestantism by the superstitious Catholics. There is no bell to the chapel; and for want of such a summons, a flourish of drums and fifes from a band stationed in Commercial Square announces when the hour of service arrives.

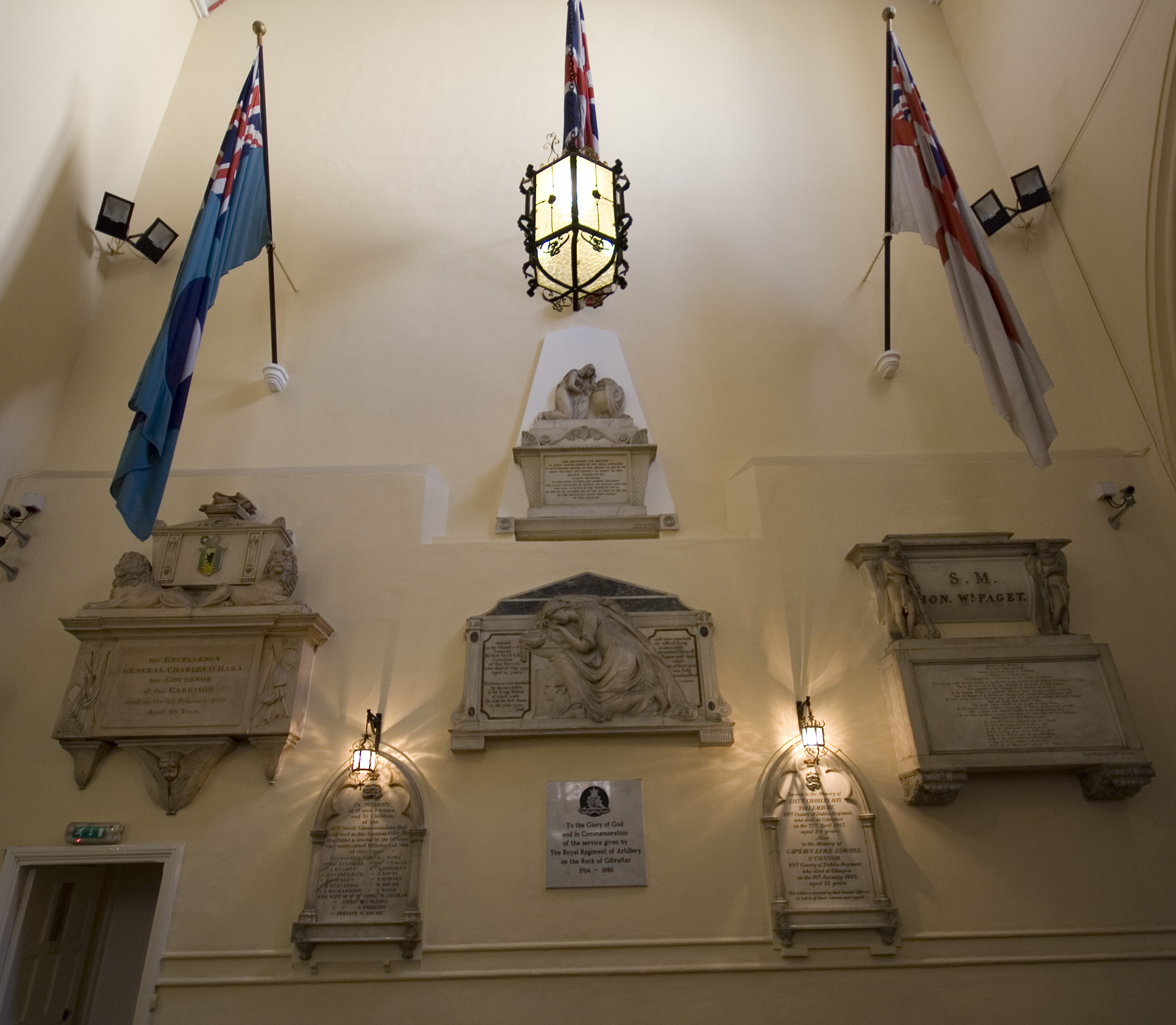
Military memorials and flags inside King's Chapel, Gibraltar

It was superseded for general use by the Cathedral of the Holy Trinity, which was completed in 1832, and became the Governor's private chapel for a short period. In 1833 an order was received from London for the closing of the King's Chapel, which was met with vigorous protests in Gibraltar. The congregation were told that they would have to pay a pew rent sufficient to maintain a military chaplain at a cost of five shillings a day. They were apparently unwilling to do so, and the chapel was duly closed.

The chapel gained a fresh lease of life in 1844 when it was restored by the Royal Engineers at a cost of £340 3s 3¾d to serve as an auxiliary place of worship for Gibraltar's civilian population. So many military personnel were now using the Cathedral of the Holy Trinity that there was little room left for the civilians. The Assistant Military Secretary at the time summarised the situation in a letter of 8 March 1844:

When the Governor assumed the government, he found the Convent Chapel in a neglected, dark, unwholesome state and a sephulchral nuisance to the residence ...[T]he Bishop and Archdeacon stated to the Governor that the Protestant community at large experienced great inconvenience from the Cathedral being so filled by the military that insufficient space was left for the civilian congregation. The Governor therefore applied for and obtained permission to restore the Chapel as an auxiliary or Chapel of Ease to the Cathedral, and not, as heretofore, the sole place of worship for the Garrison.

Its name was changed to the Queen's Chapel during the reign of Queen Victoria but reverted after her death and remained unchanged when Elizabeth II acceded to the throne in 1952. It was briefly proposed in 1944 that it should be renamed as "The Garrison Church of St. Francis" but this name never caught on.

King's Chapel underwent restoration in 1877 through the efforts of the Acting Governor's wife and new stained glass windows were installed. In 1887 an organ, built by Bevington & Sons, Soho, was controversially installed in the north-west corner of the chapel, contrary to the wishes of the chaplains, who had wanted it installed in the opposite corner but were overruled by the Governor, Sir John Adye. The following year, when it was discovered that the roof needed urgent repairs, it was decided to transfer responsibility for the chapel to the War Office so that the repairs could proceed.

The chapel survived both world wars unscathed, though the Cathedral was bombed in September 1940. However, it was badly damaged on 27 April 1951 by the accidental explosion of the RFA Bedenham in Gibraltar's harbour. The ammunition ship was destroyed after it exploded at Gun Wharf (now Queensway Quay Marina) while being unloaded, killing 13 people and causing massive damage across the city. The King's Chapel suffered the destruction of its nave ceiling and all of its stained glass.

== Restoration ==
The chapel's restoration saw the creation of new stained glass windows that were installed in 1952. The window in the north transept depicts King George VI, while that in the east wall shows Christ in glory surrounded by the Archangels Raphael, Gabriel, Uriel and Michael. The crucifixion is depicted below, with the Virgin Mary and Saint Bernard, Gibraltar's patron saint, on either side. Other panels in the window depict worshippers from the British Armed Forces, members of the Franciscan Order, the capture of Gibraltar in 1704, Saint George, the Royal Arms and the crest of the British Army. The chapel houses many memorials to members of the British Armed Forces, as well as the tombs and memorials of a number of governors and their wives.

Today, the chapel is used on a tri-service basis by the Army, Royal Navy and Royal Air Force. The three services had previously used different churches in Gibraltar – King's Chapel for the Army, Holy Trinity for the Navy and St. Michael's Chapel at RAF Gibraltar for the Royal Air Force. This arrangement was ended in 1990 when a resident Royal Navy chaplain was stationed at King's Chapel to provide chaplaincy to all three services, supported by civilian clergy. Roman Catholics also use the chapel for regular services. It is open to the public on a daily basis.

== Notable memorials ==
- John Hennen, military surgeon and author of The Principles of Military Surgery
