= World Trade Center Gibraltar =

- Interactive map of the World Trade Center Gibraltar area

General information
- Location: Bayside Road, Gibraltar, Gibraltar, Gibraltar
- Coordinates: 36.148675°N 5.351522°W
- Completed: 15 February 2017
- Landlord: World Trade Center (Gibraltar) Ltd

Technical details
- Floor area: 23,608ft2

World Trade Center, Gibraltar

World Trade Center Gibraltar is a World Trade Centers Association (WTCA) office complex located in Gibraltar. The WTCA approved the establishment of the WTC Gibraltar at the conclusion of its Annual General Assembly in Beijing, China, in October 2010.

The 253,600 square feet (23,560 m^{2}), seven-storey WTC Gibraltar building was officially opened on 15 February 2017 by Fabian Picardo, Chief Minister of Gibraltar, and Dr Joseph Garcia, Deputy Chief Minister with a 97% occupancy / reservation rate. Constructed adjacent to Ocean Village, a mixed use marina complex, it includes a Regus Business Centre, state-of-the-art telecommunications, high speed lifts, climate control, electronic security access, CCTV, parking, two food and beverage outlets, a creche, and a print services operation.

World Trade Center, Gibraltar
