= Westside, Gibraltar =

Area of Gibraltar

Westside
- Locality of Gibraltar
- Westside
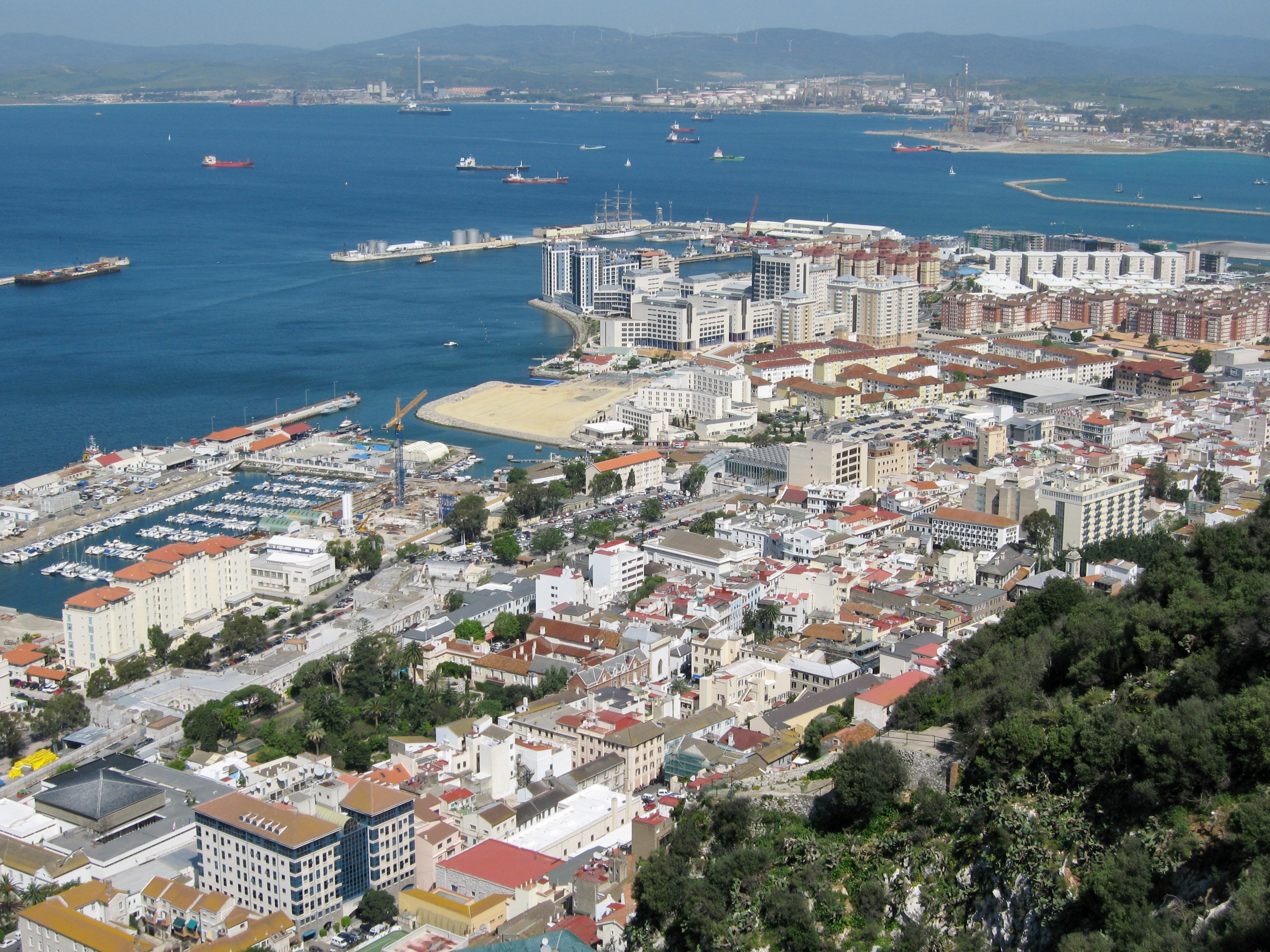
- Westside as seen from the Rock of Gibraltar.

- The map of Gibraltar, including the Westside.
- Coordinates: 36°08′35″N 5°21′17″W
- Country: United Kingdom
- Overseas territory: Gibraltar
- Major Residential Areas: North District; Reclamation Areas; Sandpits Area; South District; Town Area; Upper Town

Area
  - Total: 5.87 km^{2} (2.27 sq mi)

Population (2012)
  - Total: 31,078
  - Density: 5,290/km^{2} (13,700/sq mi)
- Time zone: UTC+01:00 (CET)
  - Summer (DST): UTC+02:00 (CEST)
- Postcode: GX11 1AA
- Area code: +350

The Westside is an area of the British overseas territory of Gibraltar. It lies between the western slopes of the Rock of Gibraltar and the eastern shores of the Bay of Gibraltar. In 2012, it was inhabited by 31,078 people and contained 98% of the territory's population of 34,000.

== Geography ==
A network of narrow streets surround Main Street which runs north–south through the old town. Grand Casemates Square at the northern end of Main Street is the larger of the two main squares (the other being John Mackintosh Square). The Governor’s Residence is at the south end of Main Street.

== Division ==
The area includes six of the seven Major Residential Areas, with the seventh, the Eastside, comprising less than 2% of the total population.

Population of Westside in 2001 and 2012
Major Residential Area	2001	2012
North District	4,116	4,267
Reclamation Areas	9,599	13,356
Sandpits Area	2,207	2,053
South District	4,257	5,681
Town Area	3,588	3,264
Upper Town	2,805	2,457
Total	26,572	31,078
