= Marina Bay, Gibraltar =

Marina in Gibraltar

Marina Bay
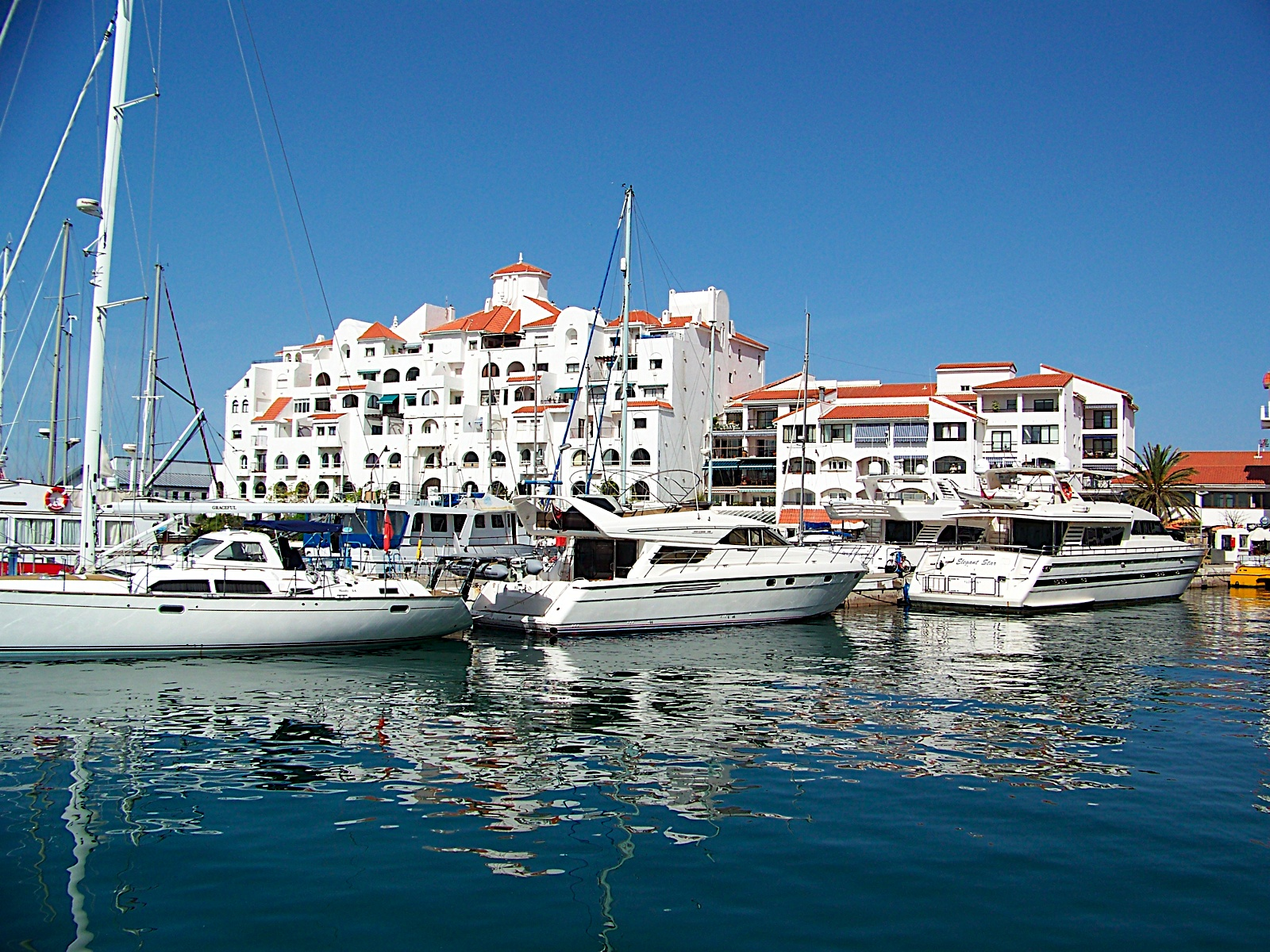
- Marina Bay, Gibraltar

Location
- Country: Gibraltar
- Location: Bay of Gibraltar
- Coordinates: 36.148298°N 5.353315°W

Details
- Opened: c. 1980
- Owned by: Ocean Village Investments Ltd
- Type of harbour: Artificial

Statistics
- Website; Marina Bay

Marina Bay is the largest of three marinas in the British Overseas Territory of Gibraltar, at the southern end of the Iberian Peninsula. It is located in the Bay of Gibraltar, between the North Mole of Gibraltar Harbour and the runway of Gibraltar International Airport. Marina Bay and the adjacent Ocean Village Marina together have been incorporated into the Ocean Village Project.

== History ==
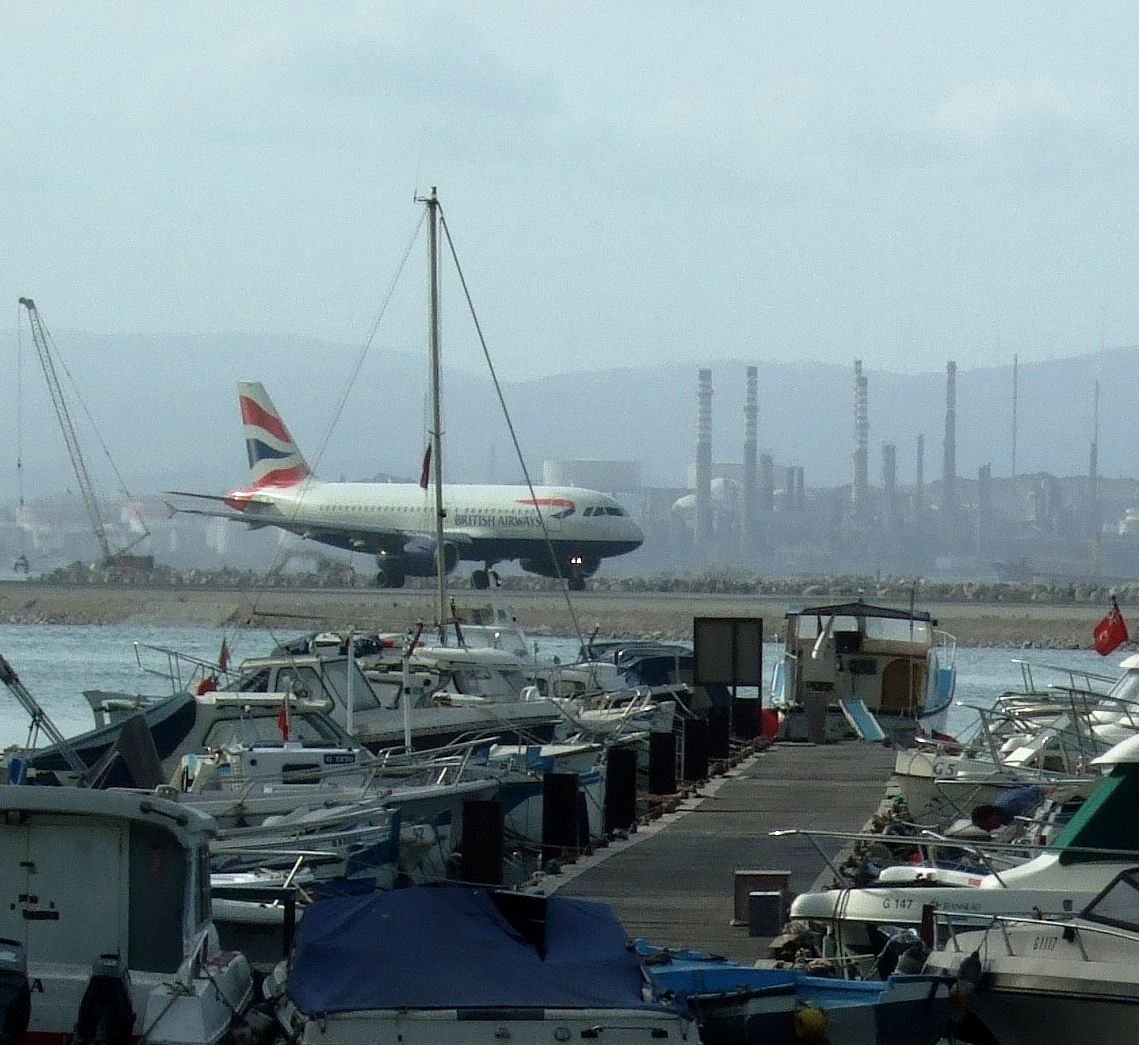
The runway is on one side of the marina

Map of Gibraltar with Marina Bay labelled "Marina" (between the North Mole and runway)

Gibraltar, the British Overseas Territory at the southern end of the Iberian Peninsula, has three marinas. These include Marina Bay, Ocean Village Marina, and Queensway Quay Marina. Marina Bay is the largest of the trio and is located on Gibraltar's Westside, just outside the northern end of Gibraltar Harbour, in the Bay of Gibraltar, next to the airport runway. It is adjacent to Ocean Village Marina which is just to its south. However, Marina Bay now forms part of the Ocean Village Project. Ocean Village Marina is the old Sheppard's Marina or Sheppard's Yard. Marina Bay and Ocean Village Marina together have been incorporated into the Ocean Village Project, between the North Mole and the airport runway.

Until recently, Marina Bay had approximately 210 berths, and could accommodate vessels up to 70 metres (230 ft) in length and with a draft (or draught) of 4.5 metres (15 ft). However, after a recent expansion (see below), the marina can handle yachts with a length of up to 100 metres (330 ft). Gibraltar's Yacht Reporting Berth closed in late 2005 and customs clearance of vessels is now handled by each marina. Each berth at Marina Bay has access to telephone service, as well as metered electricity and fresh water. Other support services for the berths include Wi-Fi, satellite TV, showers, laundry, and concierge service. Petrol and diesel are available duty-free at the fuel quay (wharf) outside the marina. The majority of Gibraltar's sailing schools are based at Marina Bay. The marina has a supermarket, as well as a variety of restaurants and taverns.

Construction of Marina Bay was completed between 1979 and 1981. It was previously operated by Marina Bay Complex Ltd, and was acquired by Ocean Village Investments Ltd in 2006. In the interval since the acquisition, both marinas, Marina Bay and Ocean Village, have been modernised, expanded, and incorporated into the Ocean Village Project, a large waterfront development. The development features three 17-storey towers, with both residential and commercial space. The towers, with blue glass balconies, include Grand Ocean Plaza, Majestic Ocean Plaza, and Royal Ocean Plaza. The two marinas, Marina Bay and Ocean Village, together offer 330 berths for vessels.

== See also ==
- Queensway Quay Marina, Gibraltar
- Ocean Village Marina, Gibraltar
