= Ocean Village, Gibraltar =

Mixed-use development in Gibraltar

Ocean Village
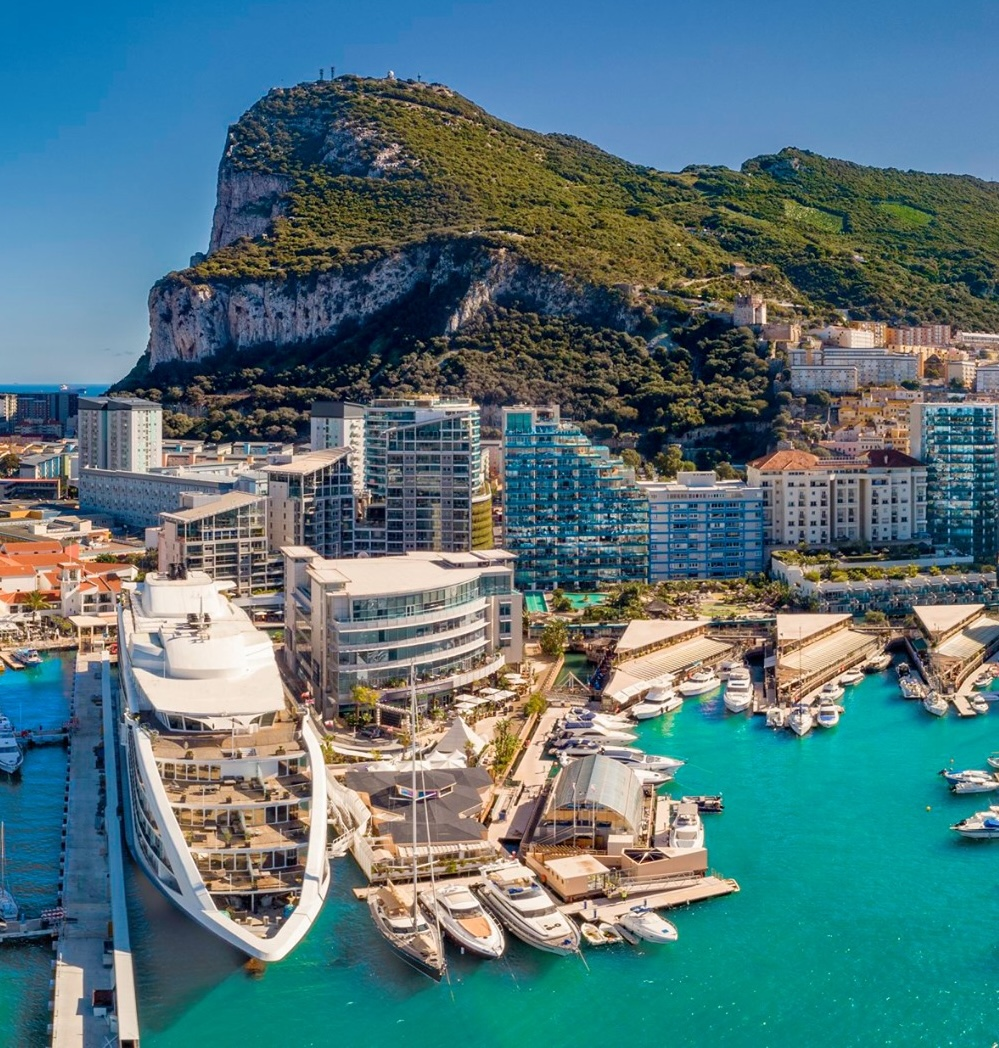
- Ocean Village, Gibraltar
- Interactive map of Ocean Village

Location
- Country: United Kingdom
- Location: Bay of Gibraltar
- Coordinates: 36.147262°N 5.353776°W

Details
- Owned by: Ocean Village Investments Ltd
- Type of harbour: Artificial
- No. of berths: 255

Statistics
- Website; OceanVillage.gi

Ocean Village is a mixed-use marina, residential, business, and leisure development in Gibraltar, in the North end of the Iberian peninsula. The project features residential apartments, marina berths, and business accommodation. Construction commenced in 2006.

The area also has a casino, restaurants and bars and a hotel.

== Marina ==
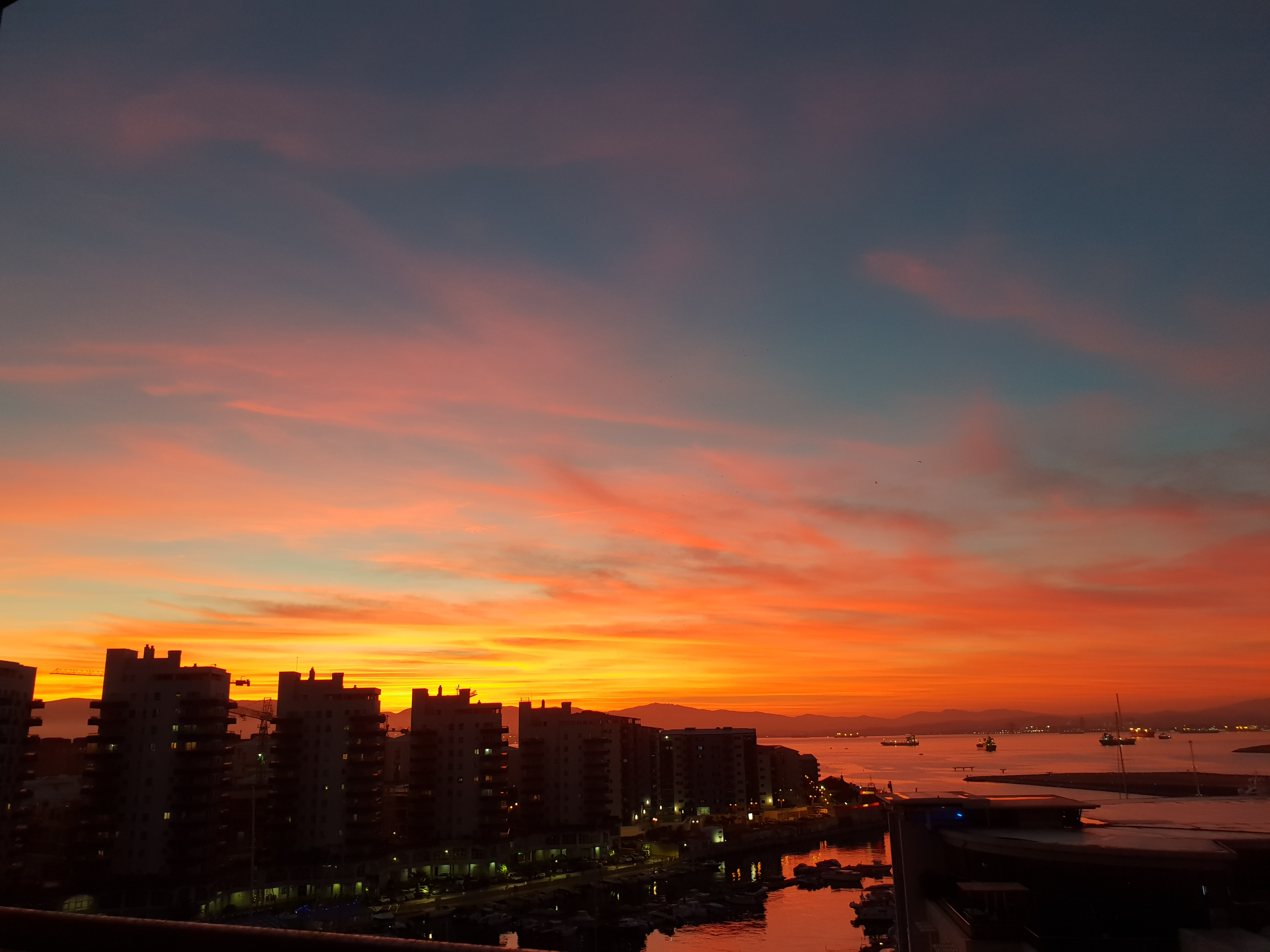
Sunset as seen from Ocean Village

Ocean Village Marina is located on the west side of Gibraltar, 14 kilometres (8.7 mi) across the Strait of Gibraltar to the northern tip of Africa. It has 255 berths starting from 8 metres (26 ft) in length with a draught of up to 4.5 metres (15 ft). Most of the Premier Berths are between 18 metres (59 ft) and 25 metres (82 ft) in length, although the largest Superyacht berths are up to 90 metres (300 ft). In June 2012, the Ocean Village Marina hosted the Gibraltar Diamond Jubilee Flotilla.

== Leisure Island Business Centre ==
The land reclamation project was completed in October 2009. The Business Centre has been fully occupied since its launch with a mixture of international brands including KPMG. The first two levels of the building house Casino Admiral (formerly Gala Casino) with three levels of executive office facilities above.

== World Trade Center Gibraltar ==
The seven-level, 17,000 square metre, world class resource, completed in 2017 is home to over sixty innovative, high tech companies. This new building was the latest to join the list of properties operating under the prestigious WTC brand in 90 countries across the globe. World Trade Center Gibraltar won the European Property Awards, Best Office Development Gibraltar in 2017.

== Residential apartments ==
Upon launch in 2003, the first residential plaza became the fastest selling large scale development in Gibraltar's history, selling out in four hours.

The four blue glass residential towers; Royal Ocean Plaza, Grand Ocean Plaza, Majestic Ocean Plaza and Imperial Ocean Plaza have seven swimming pools and six Jacuzzis set in tropical gardens. The fifth 17 storey, elliptical Ocean Spa Plaza has its own pools and spas.

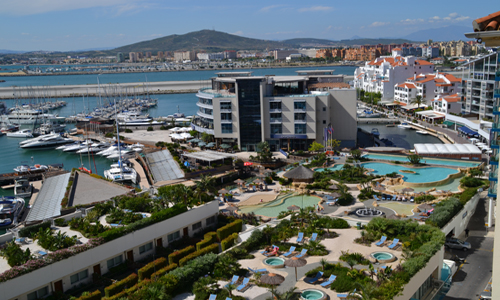
Aerial View of Ocean Village Mixed Use Marina Complex

They have won a number of awards including 2010 Bloomberg Television European Residential Property Awards and 2008 CNBC Europe & Africa Property Awards.

== Casino ==
Casino Admiral operates two casinos within Ocean Village and was the first European facility to house a casino, bingo club and sports betting zone under one roof. The casinos offer a choice of 250 jackpot slots, 80-seat poker and roulette. The venues have six bars.

== See also ==
- Marina Bay, Gibraltar
- Queensway Quay Marina, Gibraltar
