= John Hennen =

John Hennen FRSE (24 April 1779 – 3 November 1828) was an Irish-born military surgeon and author of the acclaimed medical textbook The Principles of Military Surgery.

== Life ==
He was born on 24 April 1779 in Castlebar, County Mayo in Ireland, the son of Dr. James Hennen, a surgeon. He went to school in Limerick then studied medicine at the University of Edinburgh. In 1798, he appeared as an assistant Surgeon in the Shropshire Militia.

His first major tour of duty was with Sir. Ralph Abercromby and the 40th Regiment of Foot intended for Egypt, but waylaid in Malta en route. Here he served until returning to England around 1800, where he was promoted to full surgeon, serving the 7th Garrison Battalion. He was then transferred to the 2nd Battalion of the 30th Foot Regiment and accompanied them to Portugal as part of the ongoing Peninsular War, under the overall medical charge of Dr. James McGrigor. He continued to serve through many battles until the peace of 1814, when he returned to Scotland as a GP in Dumfries.

After Napoleon's escape from Elba and re-assembly of the French Army, Hennen was again called to serve his country, and Director General of Military Medical Services, Dr James McGrigor ordered him to Brussels. As a resultant, in June 1815 he served medical duties during the Battle of Waterloo, rather oddly, accompanied by his son and daughter. Following Napoleon's defeat, Hennen was promoted to Deputy Inspector of (Military) Hospitals in Belgium and the Netherlands.

In February 1816 he returned to England to work on the staff of the main naval hospital at Portsmouth. his period of relative peace enabled him to start on his writings. In October 1818 he moved to Edinburgh where he began lecturing in Military Surgery at the University of Edinburgh.

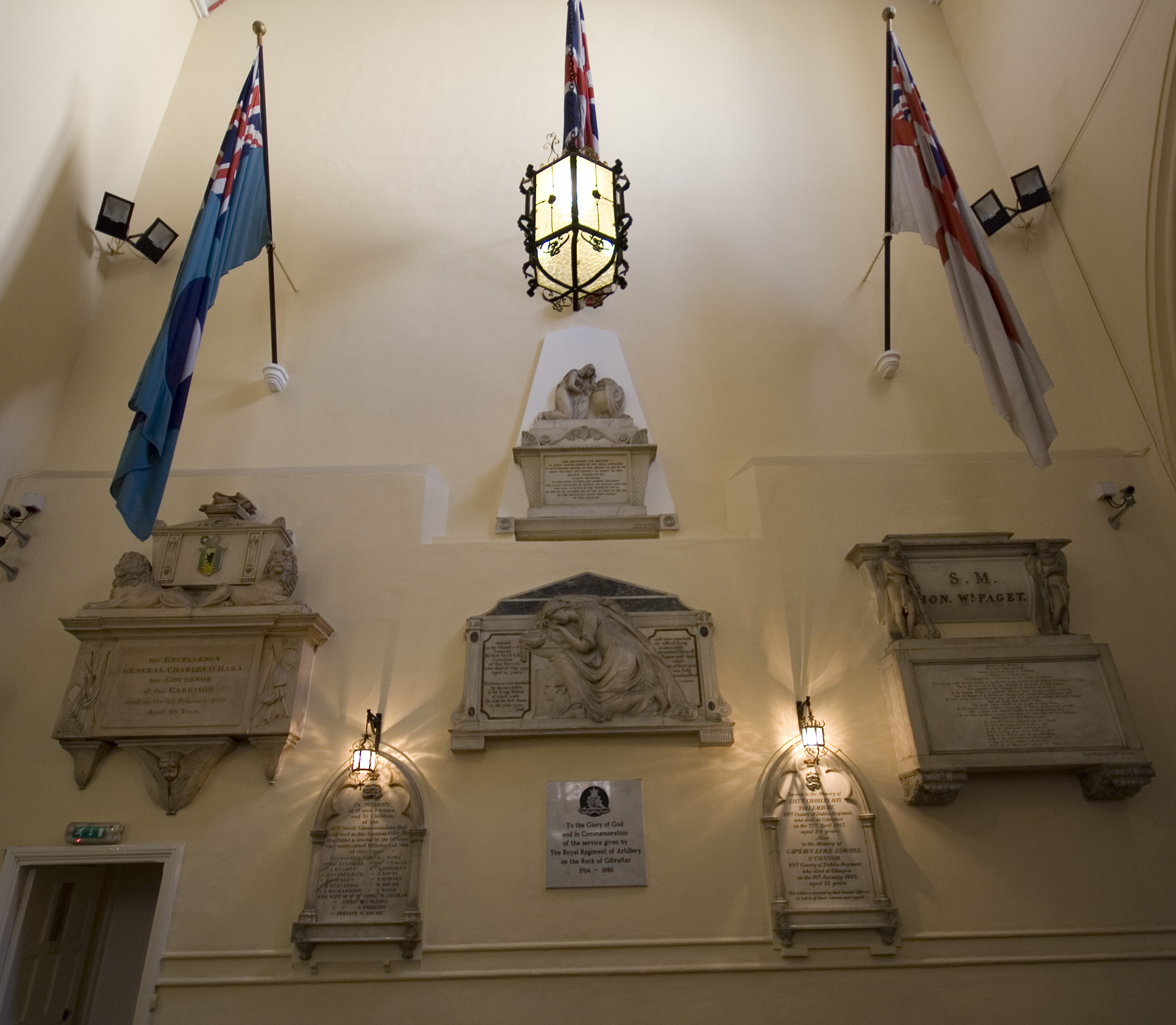
Military memorials and flags inside King's Chapel, Gibraltar

In 1819 he was elected a Fellow of the Royal Society of Edinburgh. His proposers were Thomas Charles Hope, Andrew Duncan, and Sir David Brewster.

In August 1820 the University of Edinburgh granted him his doctorate (MD). In 1821 he returned to service in the Mediterranean firstly returning to Malta then, after establishing a convalescent hospital in Gozo, going to Corfu in April 1825, before finally locating to Gibraltar in December 1825.

On 17 January 1824 he attended at the death-bed of Sir Thomas Maitland along with Dr Robert Grieves and Alexander Broadfoot.

He died in Gibraltar during an epidemic of yellow fever at 6 am on 3 November 1828, aged only 49.

A memorial plaque was erected in the King's Chapel, Gibraltar paid for by medical admirers around the globe.

== Publications ==
- Hospital Gangrene (c.1816)
- The Arrangement and Police of Hospitals (1818)
- Principles of Military Surgery (1820, second edition 1825)
- The Medical Topography of the Mediterranean (1830)

== Family ==
He was married to Miss Malcolm from Dunfermline. They had five children. Their daughter Martha Hennen married Deputy Assistant Commissary General William Condamine of Guernsey in 1822.
