= Ocean Village Marina, Gibraltar =

Marina in Gibraltar

Ocean Village Marina
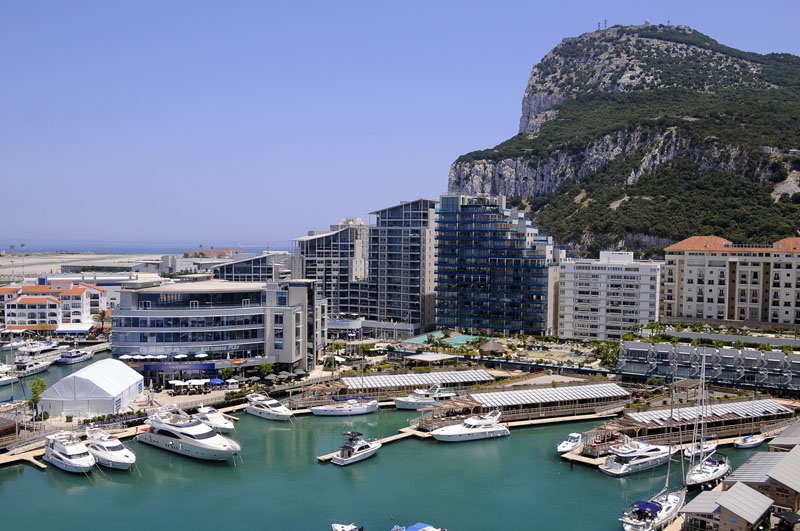
- Ocean Village Marina with Rock on right, runway and Marina Bay on far left
- Interactive map of Ocean Village Marina

Location
- Country: Gibraltar
- Location: Bay of Gibraltar
- Coordinates: 36.1478°N 5.3548°W

Details
- Owned by: Ocean Village Investments Ltd
- Type of harbour: Artificial

Statistics
- Website; Ocean Village Marina

The Ocean Village Marina is one of three marinas in the British Overseas Territory of Gibraltar, at the southern end of the Iberian Peninsula. Formerly Sheppard's Marina, it is located in the Bay of Gibraltar, between the North Mole of Gibraltar Harbour and the runway of Gibraltar International Airport. Both Ocean Village Marina and the adjacent Marina Bay have been incorporated into the Ocean Village Project, a luxury resort.

Ocean Village Marina and the adjacent Marina Bay together have 330 berths, with a draft (or draught) of 4.5 metres (15 ft). The marina can accommodate vessels up to 90 metres (300 ft) to 100 metres (330 ft) in length. There are three residential towers with blue glass balconies overlooking the marina: Grand Ocean Plaza, Imperial Plaza, and Majestic Plaza. On 4 June 2012, Ocean Village Marina hosted 161 vessels which formed the Gibraltar Diamond Jubilee Flotilla, celebrating sixty years of the Queen's reign.

== Location ==
Map of Gibraltar showing the location of Ocean Village Marina between the North Mole and runway

Gibraltar has three marinas: Marina Bay, Ocean Village Marina, and Queensway Quay Marina. Ocean Village Marina is located on Gibraltar's Westside, outside the northern end of Gibraltar Harbour, in the Bay of Gibraltar, next to the airport runway. It is adjacent to Marina Bay which is just to its north. The marina forms part of the Ocean Village Project or Ocean Village Marina Complex, often referred to as just Ocean Village. Ocean Village Marina is the former Sheppard's Marina or Sheppard's Yard. Both Marina Bay and Ocean Village Marina have been incorporated into Ocean Village, between the North Mole and the airport runway. The strategic location of the marina offers protection from moisture-laden Levanter winds.

== History ==
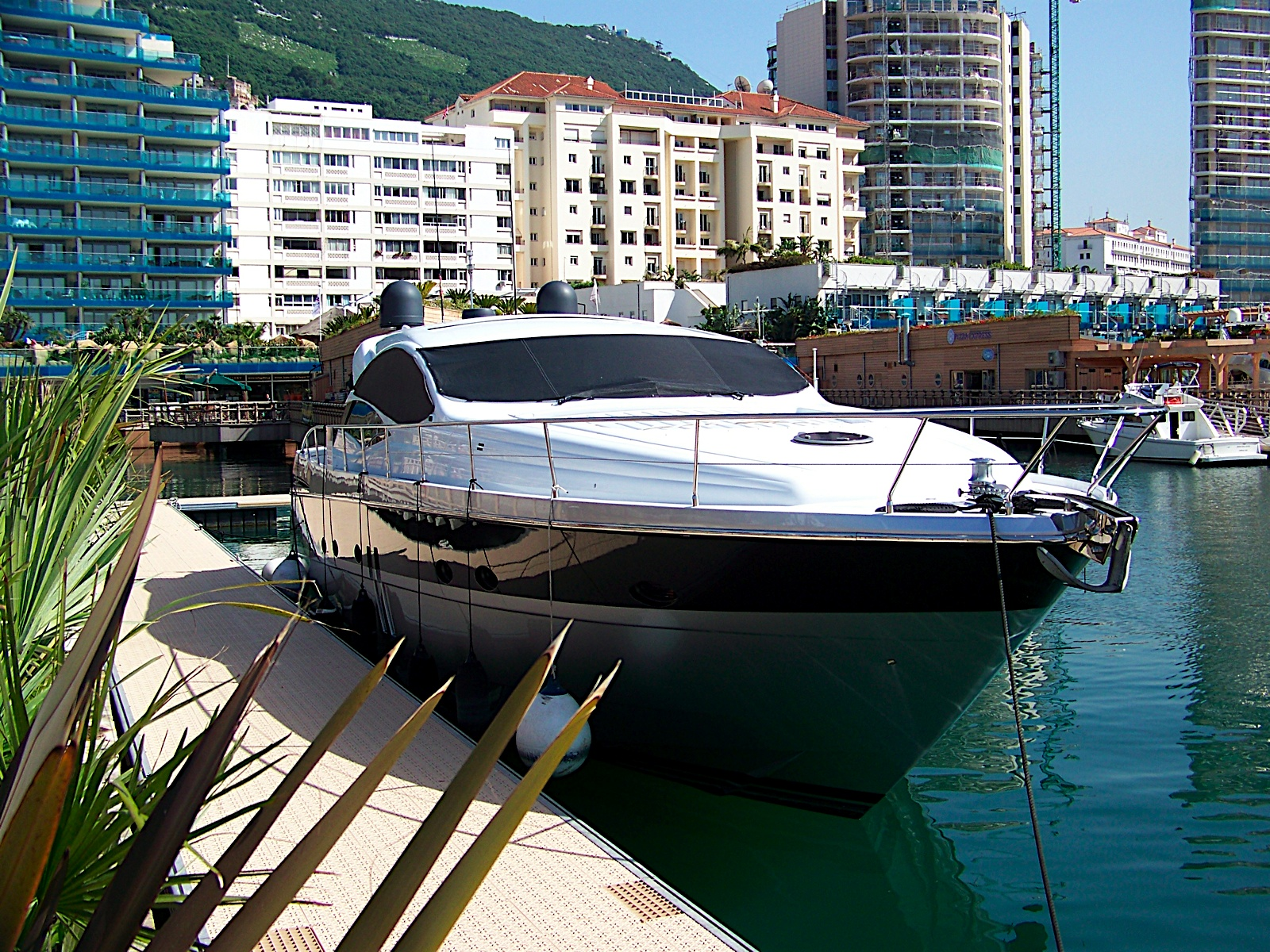
Ocean Village Marina, Gibraltar

Ocean Village Marina was formerly Sheppard's Marina, owned by H. Sheppard & Co. By 2004, the marina had been sold to Ocean Village Investments Ltd and demolition had commenced. The marina retained its original name, at least informally, for several years after the sale. The sale of Sheppard's Marina was not without controversy, as some residents of the marina were eventually evicted from their berths by the new owners. After Ocean Village Investments acquired the adjacent Marina Bay in 2006, both marinas were incorporated into Ocean Village, a resort with residential, retail, and leisure facilities.

On 4 June 2012, the Ocean Village Marina hosted 161 vessels which formed the Gibraltar Diamond Jubilee Flotilla, celebrating sixty years of the Queen's reign. The flotilla took place one day after a similar event in London up the Thames. Boats up to 70 metres (230 ft) participated in the flotilla. Small boats led the flotilla, followed by power boats over 9 metres (30 ft), and, finally, sailing vessels. The General Elliot, a Gibraltar Port Authority vessel, was at the head of the flotilla, and was supported by other official vessels.

== Facilities ==
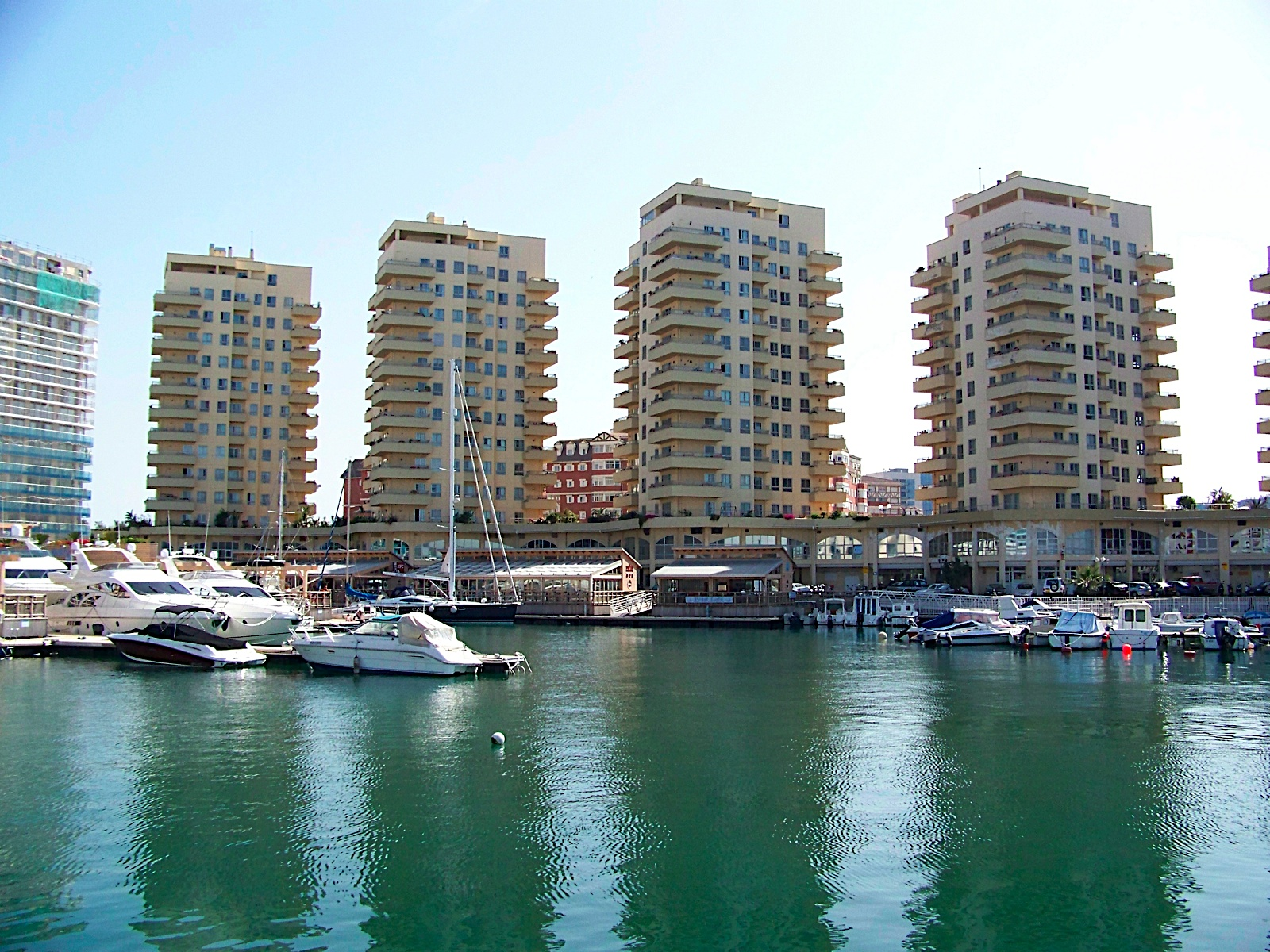
Residential development on the marina

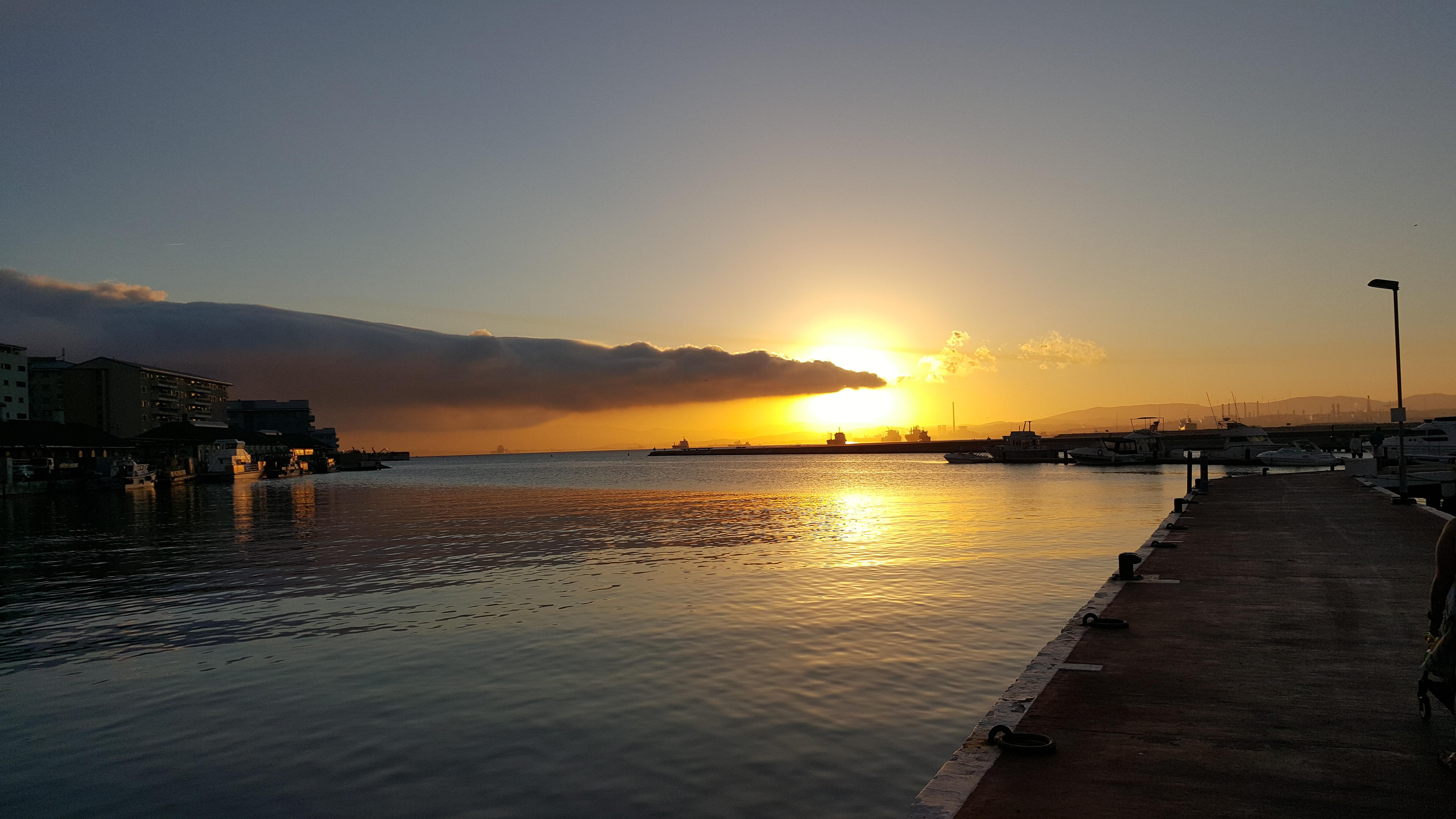
Sunset as seen from the Marina main pier

Ocean Village Marina and the adjacent Marina Bay together have 330 berths, with a draft of 4.5 metres (15 ft). The marina can accommodate vessels up to 90 metres (300 ft) to 100 metres (330 ft) in length. The marina now offers premier berths, the majority of which are between 18 metres (59 ft) and 25 metres (82 ft), although the largest can accommodate vessels up to 80 metres (260 ft) in length. The Yacht Reporting Berth for Gibraltar closed in 2005 and customs clearance of vessels is now performed by the individual marinas. Each berth at Ocean Village Marina offers utilities which include metered water and electricity, as well as access to satellite television, telephone, fax, and Wi-Fi. Other amenities include laundry and concierge services. Gasoline and diesel are available at the quayside.

In addition to the marina, the Ocean Village resort features three residential towers, with blue glass balconies, that also have commercial space: Grand Ocean Plaza, Imperial Plaza, and Majestic Plaza. Construction of a new World Trade Center in Ocean Village was scheduled to begin in 2012. The development has a variety of restaurants, bars, and retail outlets, as well as executive office space. Leisure Island, on reclaimed land, has a business centre and casino, among other facilities.

Sheppard's of Gibraltar, the former owner of the marina which was established in 1961, still has a presence there. The business provides support services for yacht owners from both their chandlery and shipyard departments. Their chandlery shop on the ground floor of Marina Court at Ocean Village has a variety of products for yacht equipment and maintenance. Their shipyard on Coaling Island near Queensway Quay Marina performs repair services such as engine rebuilds, rigging, welding, and painting. Sheppard's attends to yachts at all three of Gibraltar's marinas, and also has a 40-ton lift when haul-outs are needed. Their haul-out work includes hull cleaning, replacement of anodes or transducers, and slurry blasting, among other services. Haul-outs are performed at both Coaling Island and the North Mole.

== See also ==
- Ocean Village, Gibraltar
- Marina Bay, Gibraltar
- Queensway Quay Marina, Gibraltar
