= Postal addresses in Gibraltar =

The British Overseas Territory of Gibraltar has introduced the postal code GX11 1AA. This is pending the introduction of a postcode system similar to that used in the United Kingdom. This has been under consideration by the Government of Gibraltar since 2006. The postcode is not required for local mail.

== Postal districts ==
The Royal Gibraltar Post Office has divided the territory into fourteen postal zones known as 'walks' or 'districts', each with a number or letter as well as a name, but these are for internal use and not encountered in addresses. They are separate from the Major Residential Areas, used for statistical purposes.

Walk number	District
1	Reclamation North
2	Sacred Heart
3	Reclamation South 1
4	Lower South
5	Moorish Castle
6	Town Range
7	Reclamation South 2
8	North Front
9	Reclamation South 3
10	Waterport
11	Upper South
12	Southport
13	Upper Rock
G	Growth Walk
