= Sandbox (disambiguation) =

A sandbox is a wide, shallow playground construction to hold sand, often made of wood or plastic.

Sandbox or sand box may also refer to:

== Arts, entertainment, and media ==
=== Music ===
- Sandbox (band), a Canadian rock music group
- Sandbox (Guided by Voices album), 1987
- Sandbox (Michael Houser album), 2006, or the title track
- Sandbox (The All-American Rejects album), 2026
- Sandbox: The Music of Mark Sandman, 2004 album

=== Theater ===
- Sandbox Theatre, an experimental theatre group in Minneapolis, Minnesota
- The Sandbox (play), a 1960 one-act play by Edward Albee

=== Video gaming ===
- Sandbox game, a genre or mode of some video games for open-ended, nonlinear play
- The Sandbox (2012 video game), a 2012 game for mobile phones
- S&box, an open source game engine by Facepunch Studios
- Sandbox Studios, a computer- and video-game developer
- The Sandbox (company), a metaverse platform developer
- Sandbox (video game editor), a game level editor for Far Cry

=== Film ===
- The Sandbox (film), a 2026 Canadian documentary film

== Computing ==
- Sandbox (computer security), a virtual container in which untrusted programs can be safely run
- Sandbox (software development), an environment in which code or content changes can be tested without affecting the original system
- Sandbox effect, in Google Internet search rankings

== Other uses ==
- Sand box (civil engineering), a device to remove centring
- Sandbox (locomotive), a container that holds sand for use in improving rail adhesion in slippery conditions
- Sandbox (missile) or SS-N-12, a Soviet anti-ship missile
- Sandbox, a container for pounce (calligraphy), used before the invention of blotting paper
- Sandbox therapy, a tool used by child psychologists
- Sandbox tree, the evergreen species Hura crepitans of the spurge family (Euphorbiaceae), also known as possumwood and jabillo, native to tropical regions in the Americas

== See also ==
- Litter box, an indoor sandbox, usually filled with kitty litter, in which house pets are trained to relieve themselves
- Sandboxie, an operating system-level virtualization program
