= Main Street, Gibraltar =

Main arterial street in Gibraltar

Main Street Calle Real
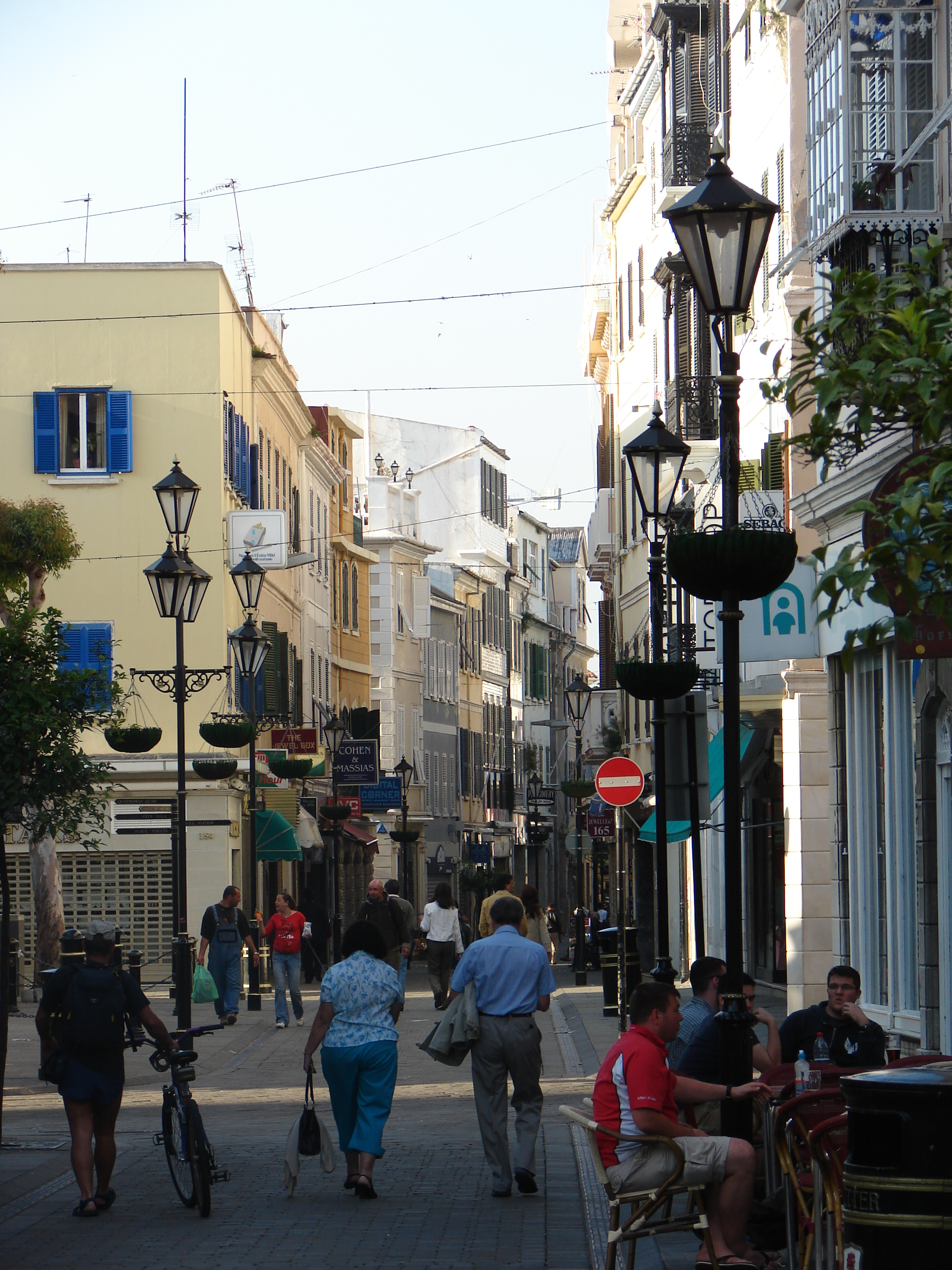
- View from Main Street looking north.
- Interactive map of Main Street; Calle Real
- Former name: Calle Real
- Owner: Government of Gibraltar
- Length: 1 km (0.62 mi)
- Location: Gibraltar
- Coordinates: 36.139682°N 5.353794°W

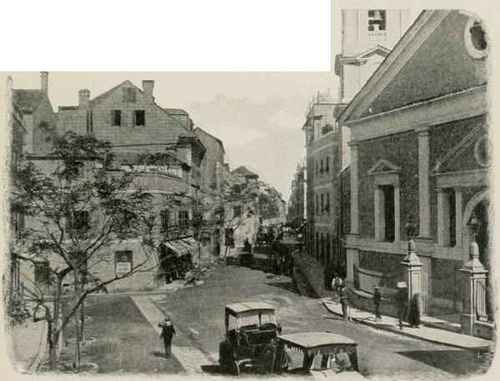
Old photograph of Main Street taken in the early 1900s just outside the Cathedral of St. Mary the Crowned.

Main Street (original name: Calle Real) is the main arterial street in the British overseas territory of Gibraltar.

== History ==
Main Street's route was established in the 14th century which was confirmed when the Puerta de África (now called the Southport Gates) were built in 1575, during the Spanish period.

Nearly every building on Main Street was damaged during the Great Siege of Gibraltar when from 1779 to 1783 the town was attacked by a combined French and Spanish fleet. Because Main Street was near the harbour, it was easily bombarded by the ships in the harbour. Col. John Drinkwater wrote:

Some few [houses], near South-port, continued to be inhabited by soldiers families; but in general the floors and roofs were destroyed and the bare shell only was left standing."

The street's route has only had minor adjustments when the front of the Cathedral of St. Mary the Crowned was re-modeled and downsized in 1801 in order to straighten the street on the orders of the British governor, Charles O'Hara. A branch of Marks & Spencer was established in Gibraltar on the street in 1968.

== Description ==
Main Street is Gibraltar's main commercial and shopping district. It runs north–south through the old town which is pedestrianised and lined with buildings displaying a blend of Genoese, Portuguese, Andalusian, Moorish and British Regency styles, most of which have shops on the ground floor. Upper floors provide residential accommodation or offices. Tourists and visitors will find a wide variety of shops, many of which will be familiar from British high streets.

Irish Town is a street name and one of Main Street's sub-districts and was named in the early 19th century when Gibraltar was split into differing quarters.

Gibraltar's city centre is largely protected by the Gibraltar Heritage Trust and is part of a continual restoration programme.

== Grand Casemates Square ==
Grand Casemates Square at the northern end of Main Street, once the centre of public executions, is the hub of Gibraltar's nightlife, and is filled with numerous restaurants, pubs and bars.

== Notable buildings on Main Street ==
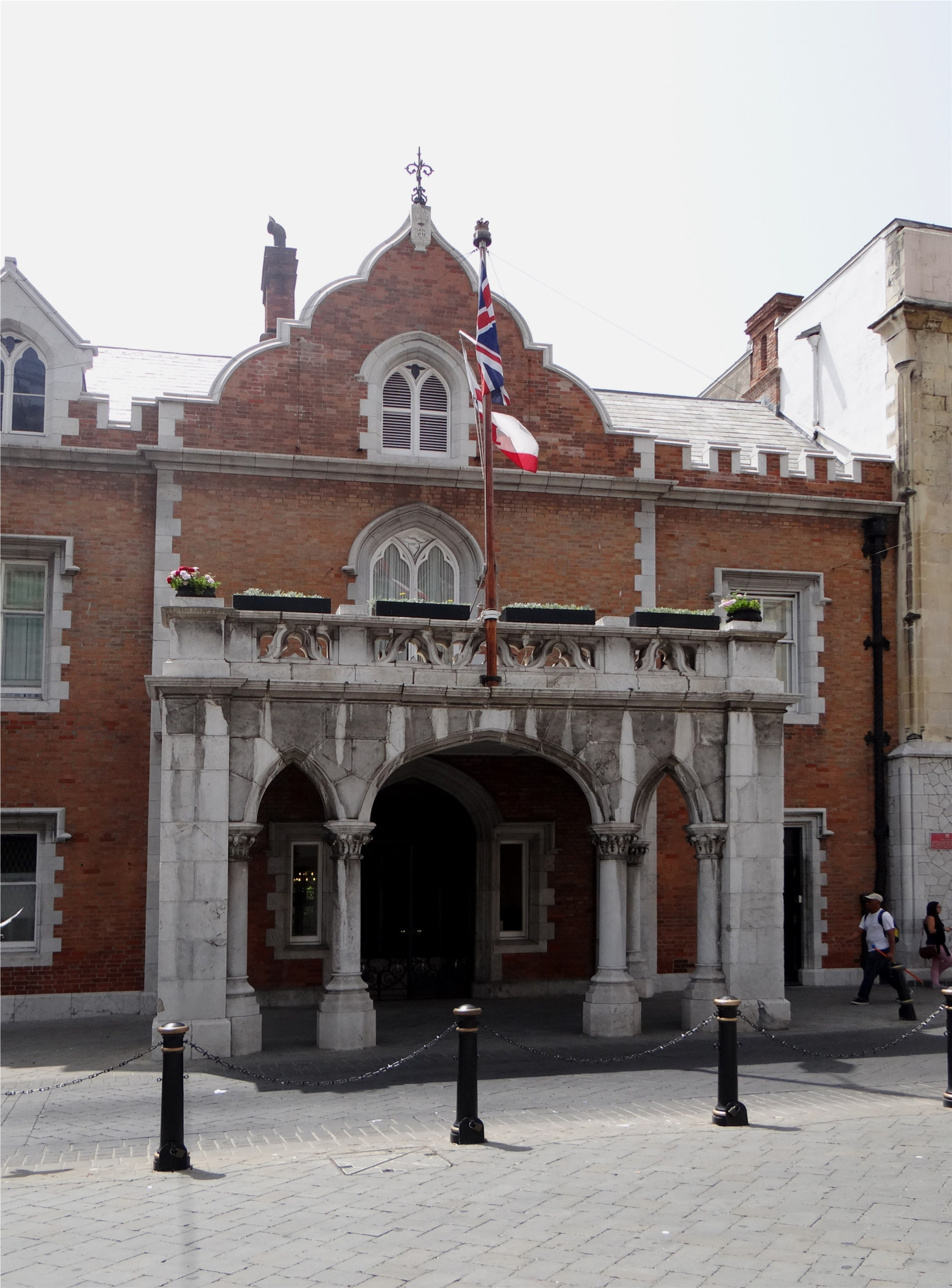
Gibraltar Governor's Residence, The Convent

- Cathedral of St. Mary the Crowned
- Cathedral of the Holy Trinity
- Gibraltar Governor's Residence, The Convent
- Gibraltar Law Courts
- Gibraltar Parliament
- Ince's Hall Theatre
- John Mackintosh Hall
- King's Chapel
- Royal Gibraltar Post Office at No. 104
