= Sandspit =

Sandspit may refer to:

- Sandspit, British Columbia, a town on Haida Gwaii, British Columbia, Canada
  - Sandspit Airport, an airport serving the town in British Columbia
- Sandspit, New Zealand, a suburb of Auckland, New Zealand
- Sandspit Beach, a major tourist site in Karachi, Pakistan
- Sandspit (landform), a deposition landform found off coasts
