= The Convent, Gibraltar =

Official residence

The Convent
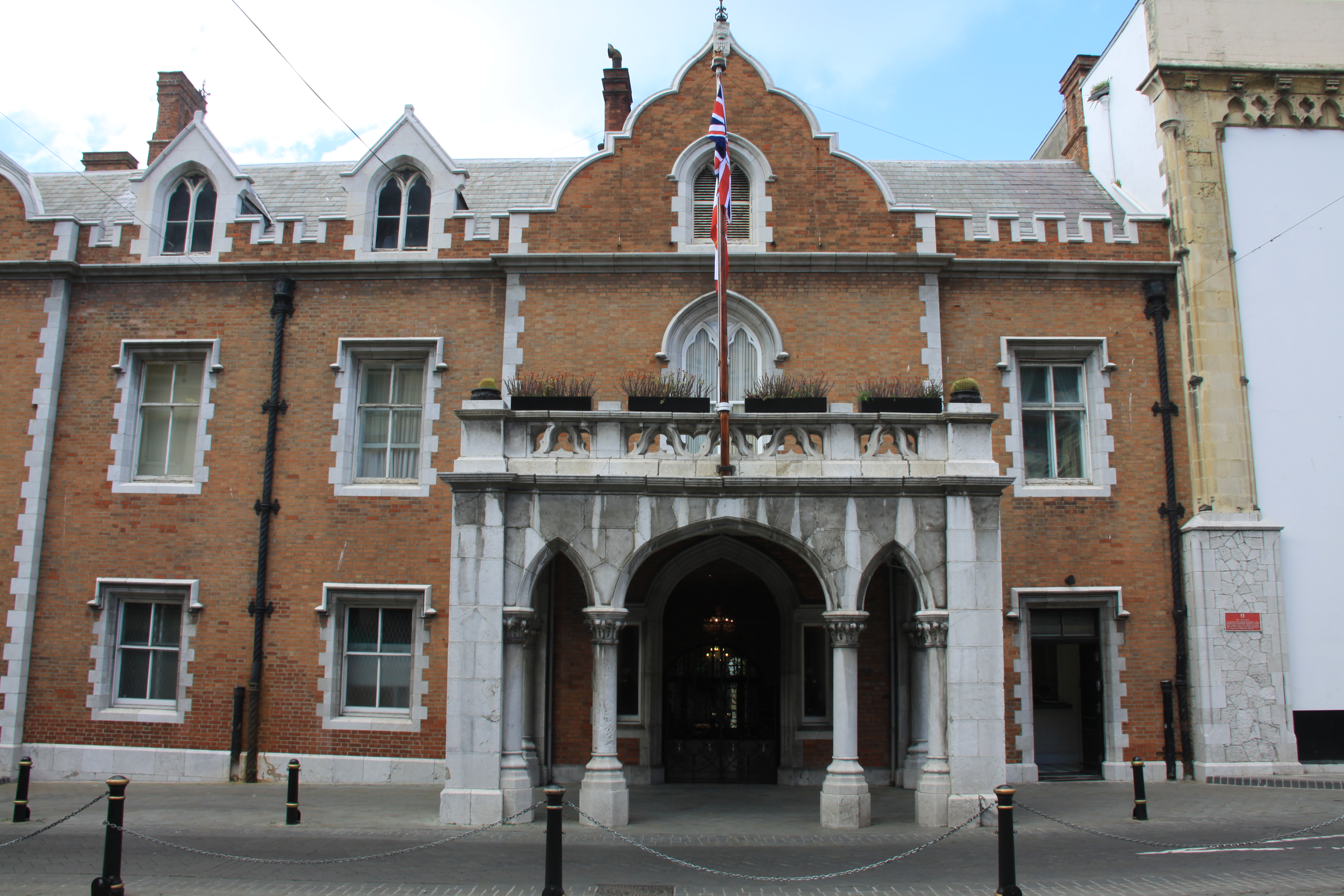
- The Convent with King's Chapel on the right
- Interactive map of the The Convent area
- Former names: Convent of Franciscan Friars; Gibraltar Palace

General information
- Architectural style: Early Georgian with later Victorian features being introduced
- Location: Main Street, Gibraltar
- Coordinates: 36.137115°N 5.353526°W
- Current tenants: Governor of Gibraltar
- Completed: 19th century
- Owner: UK Ministry of Defence

Technical details
- Floor count: 3

The Convent has been the official residence of the governor of Gibraltar since 1728. It was originally a convent of Franciscan friars, hence its name, and was built in 1531, and heavily rebuilt during the 18th and 19th centuries.

The dining room at the Convent has the most extensive display of heraldry in the Commonwealth of Nations.

== History ==
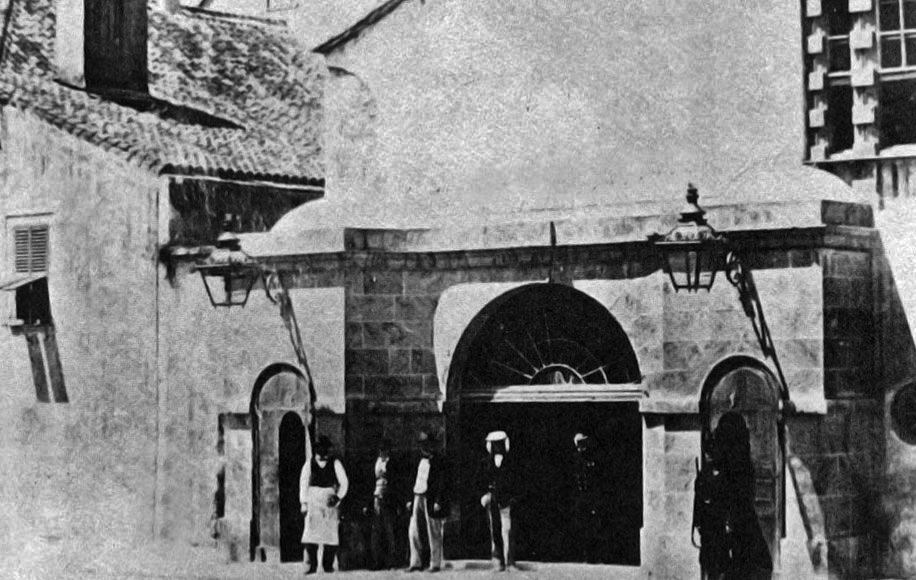
Mid 19th century façade of The Convent

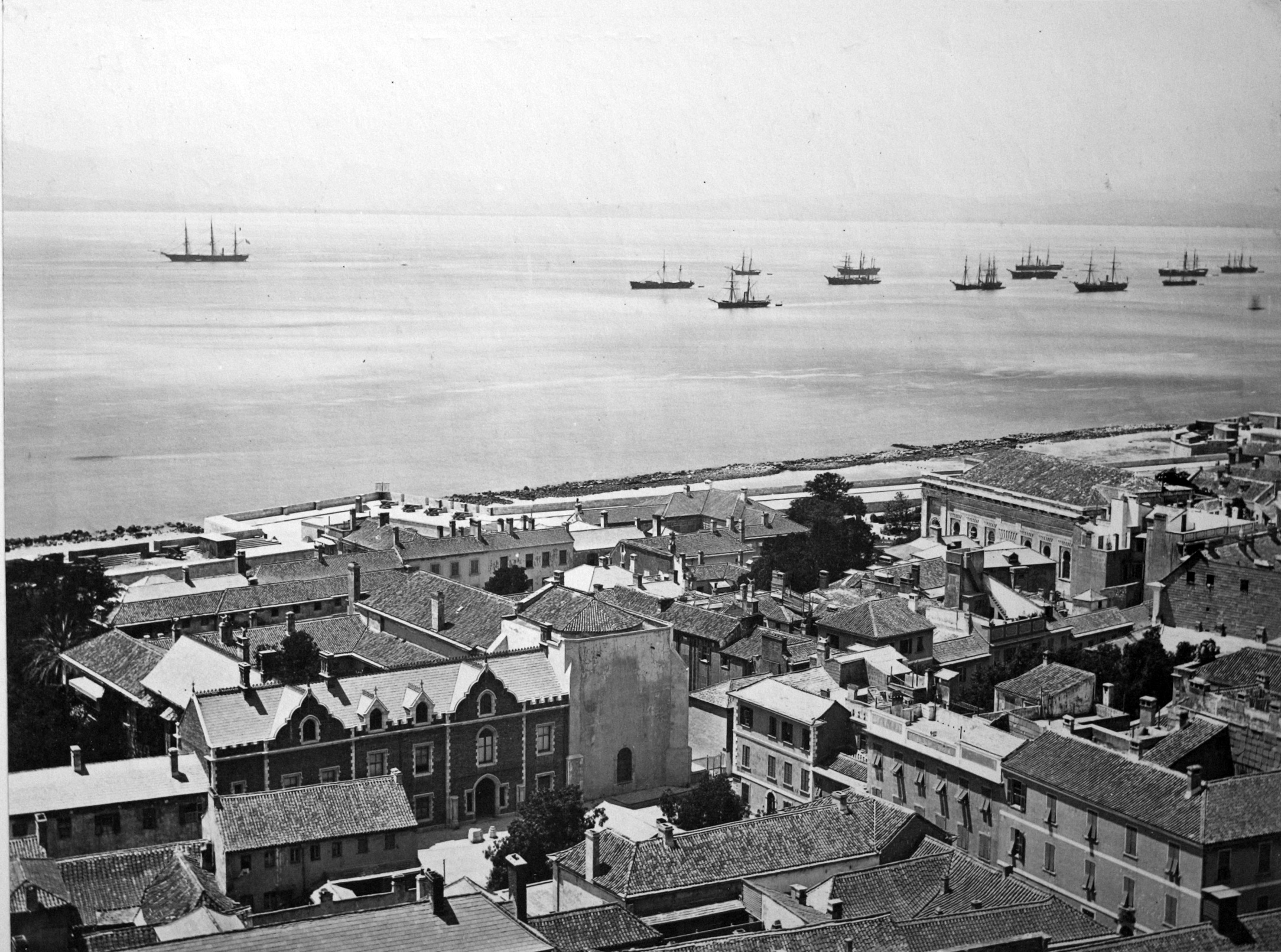
View of The Convent and its environs from the Upper Town in 1879, with the building's iconic balcony being constructed

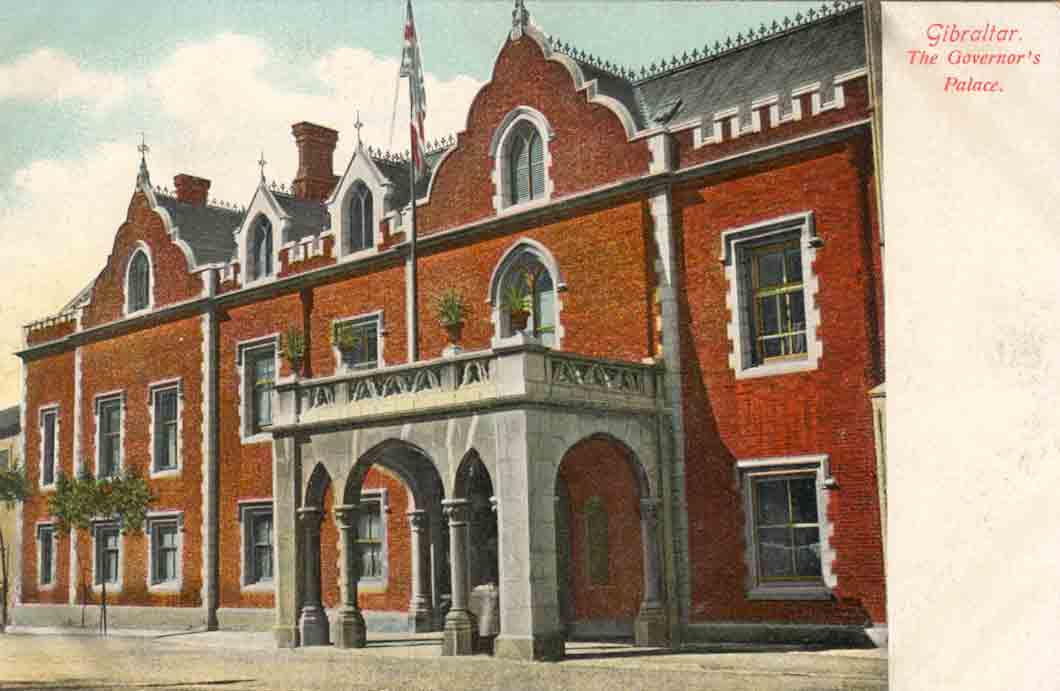
The Convent in a 1909 postcard

Franciscan friars arrived in Gibraltar during the reign of Charles I of Spain. They were granted a plot of land in the area known at the time as La Turba where the poorer people of Gibraltar lived. A church and a friary were built in 1531. The entrance was at the back (what is now Governor's Lane). It stretched up to the area that is occupied today by the John Mackintosh Hall.

After the capture of Gibraltar by an Anglo-Dutch fleet in the name of the Archduke Charles, the Franciscan friars did not follow the exodus of the Spanish population and remained in Gibraltar, at least for some years (their presence was recorded in 1712). The Franciscan friary was later taken over as the residence of the British governors in 1728 and has remained so ever since.

The building was heavily rebuilt during the 18th and 19th centuries in the Georgian style with Victorian elements.

In 1903 Gibraltar received its first visit from a British Monarch when Edward VII arrived to name the new No. 3 Dock of Gibraltar Harbour after himself. He received complaints that as head of the Church of England he should visit a Catholic institution like The Convent. The King requested that the building should be called Government House. The new dry docks attracted Queen Alexandra in HMY Victoria and Albert in 1906 and the Prince and Princess of Wales the following year to name dock number two and then one after themselves.

== Overview ==
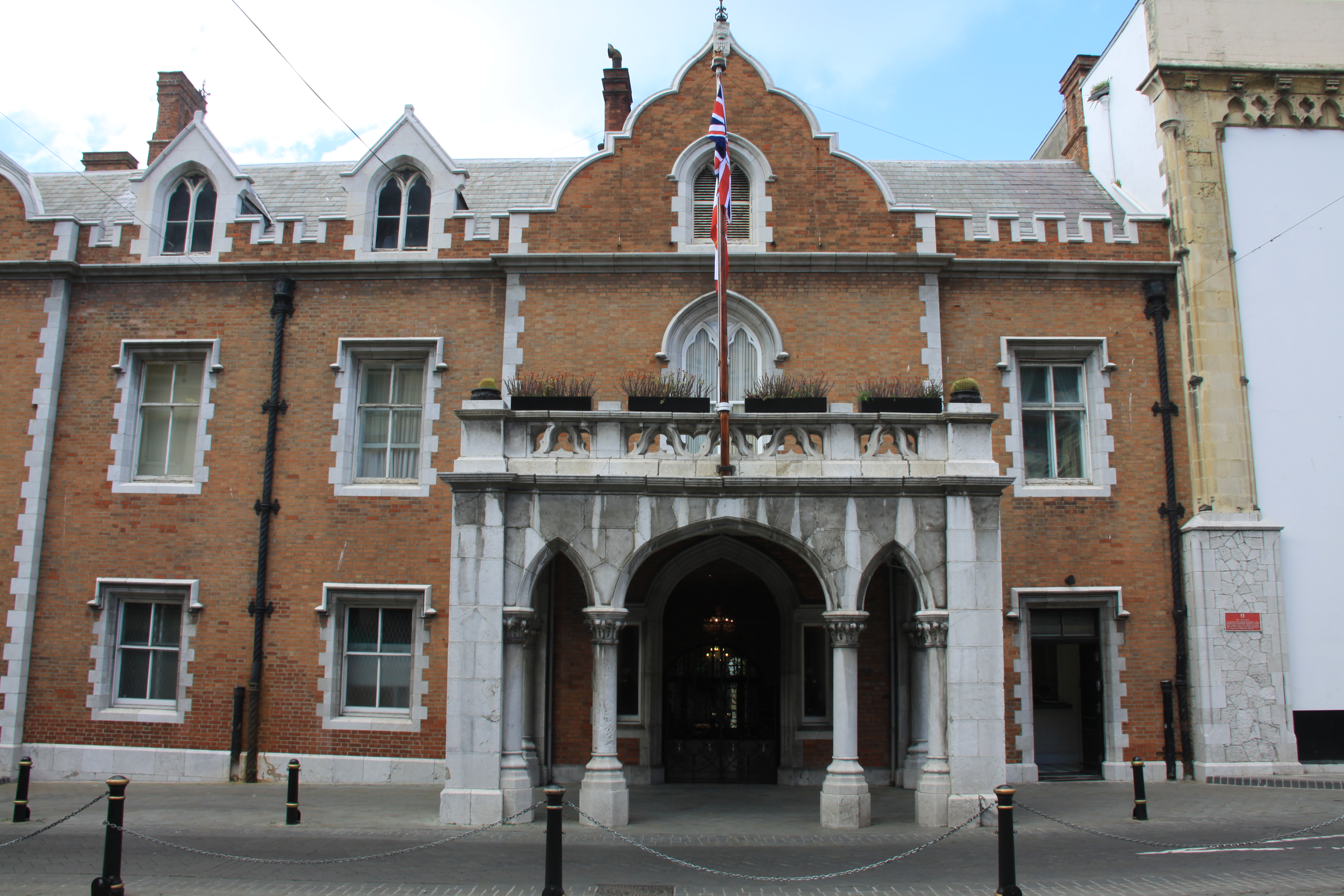
Main Street entrance to the Governor's House, The Convent

The Convent is situated towards the southern end of Main Street. A guard mount takes place at the main entrance a few days a week conducted by soldiers of the Royal Gibraltar Regiment. The Changing of the Guard is also conducted outside the Convent a few times a year.

== King's Chapel ==
The garrison church adjacent to the Convent, part of the original Franciscan complex, was renamed Queen's Chapel during Queen Victoria's reign, but Queen Elizabeth II restored it back to its original title. Inside the chapel, beneath the colours of several British regiments, lie the remains of the wife of the Spanish governor of 1648, together with those of two British governors: General Charles O'Hara and Lieutenant-General Colin Campbell, who were laid to rest in 1802 and 1814, respectively.

== Ghost story ==
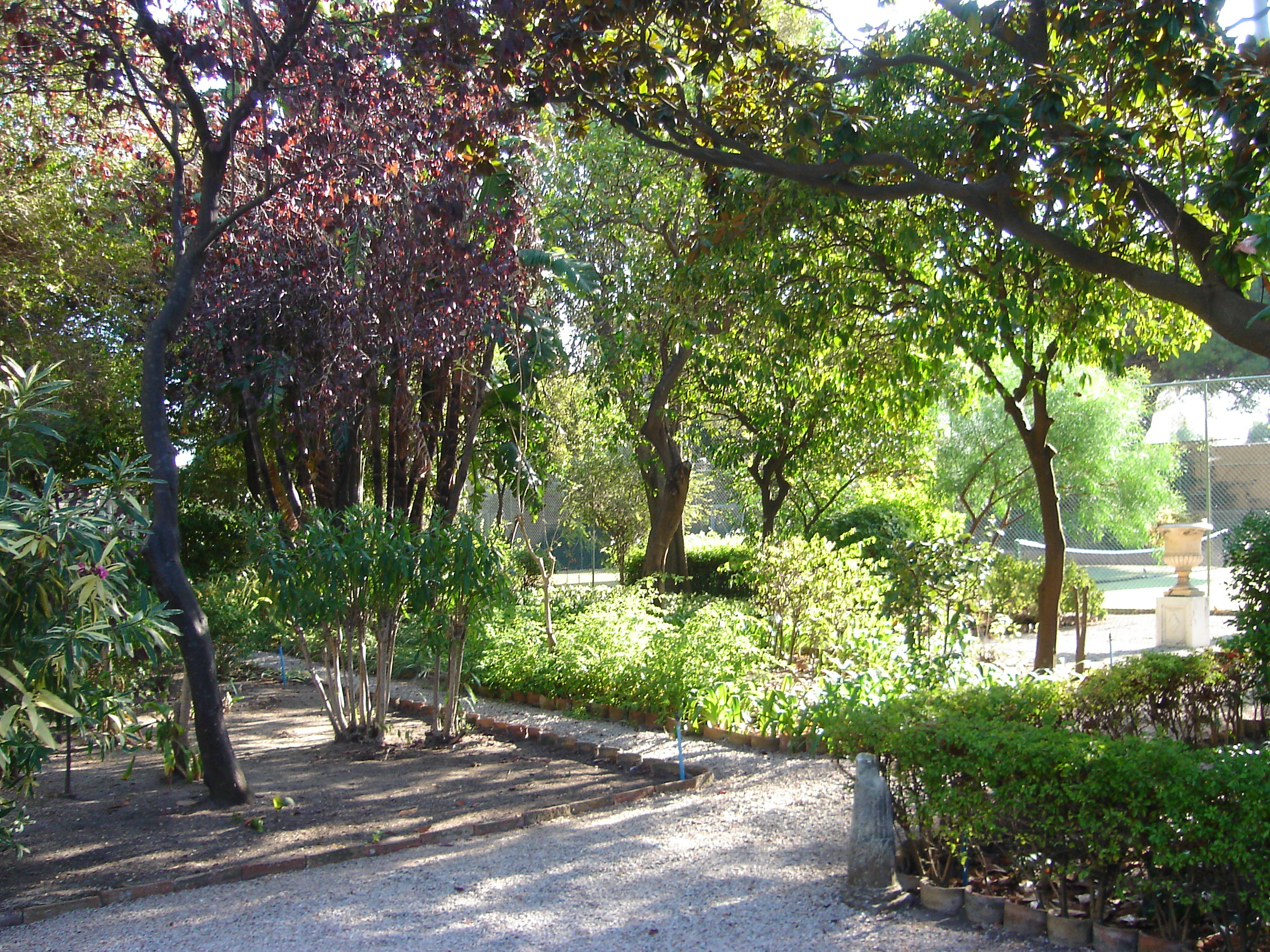
Among some of the trees in the Convent Gardens are those planted by Edward VII, German Emperor Wilhelm II, Japanese Emperor Hirohito and Queen Elizabeth II.

The convent is supposedly haunted by the ghost of a nun, known as "Lady in Grey" who is said to roam the corridor outside one of the guest rooms. It is said that she considers it to be her room, as she was walled up alive in it.

There are various versions of the "Grey Lady" story, the most popular being that she was the daughter of an affluent Spanish family who had married against her father's wishes. When he learnt of it, he placed her in the "Convent of Santa Clara" situated in the Main Street, where under the eyes of the Mother Superior, the girl was forced to take her vows and become a nun. Her lover was not discouraged; he joined the Franciscan Order and settled in the Convent. The couple are said to have met in the confessional of the King's Chapel where they hatched plans for their escape.

On the night of their escape they made their way to the harbour where a boat was waiting for them. However, the alarm was raised and in the ensuing chase the lover fell into the water and drowned. The bride was arrested for breaking her vows and as punishment was walled up alive in one of the rooms in the Convent.

== See also ==
- Architecture of Gibraltar
- Governor of Gibraltar
- History of Gibraltar
- Political development in modern Gibraltar
