= Queensway Quay Marina, Gibraltar =

Marina in Gibraltar

Queensway Quay Marina
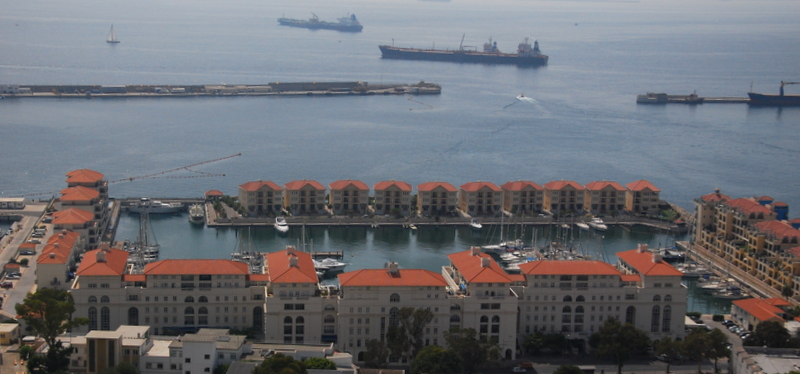
- View of Queensway Quay Marina as seen from Gibraltar's Upper Town.

Location
- Country: Gibraltar
- Location: Gibraltar Harbour
- Coordinates: 36.13493°N 5.35594°W

Details
- Opened: c. 1993
- Owned by: Paul Butler
- Type of harbour: Artificial
- No. of berths: 185

Statistics
- Website; Queensway Quay Marina

The Queensway Quay Marina is one of three marinas in the British Overseas Territory of Gibraltar, at the southern end of the Iberian Peninsula. The yachting facility is located at the eastern aspect of the middle section of Gibraltar Harbour. It is the site of what may be the oldest wharf in Gibraltar, Ragged Staff Wharf.

== Infrastructure ==
Gibraltar, the British Overseas Territory at the southern end of the Iberian Peninsula, has three marinas. These include Marina Bay, Ocean Village Marina, and Queensway Quay Marina. While the first two are positioned just north of Gibraltar Harbour, between the North Mole and the airport runway, Queensway Quay Marina is located within the middle section of the harbour. The marina is east of the south entrance to the harbour and south of Coaling Island. The most southern of the three marinas has the advantage of being further from Gibraltar International Airport and its attendant noise and fuel odors.

Visitors to Queensway Quay Marina enter Gibraltar Harbour through the south entrance, between the South Mole and the Detached Mole. They stop at the south pontoon (floating dock) to be assigned a berth, and are customarily berthed on the most southern of the pontoons. A coded security system controls access to the pontoons. Gibraltar's Yacht Reporting Berth closed in late 2005 and customs clearance of vessels is now handled by each marina.

The marina has 185 berths, including facilities for up to eight 30 metre and two 40 metre vessels. In addition, it has a 75-metre berth, although its ability to accommodate a larger vessel is dependent upon the boat's draft (or draught). Metered water and electricity are available at all berths, and some berths have access to cable television and telephone. The marina also has shower and toilet facilities, as well as access to a laundry service. In addition, Queensway Quay Marina has a variety of restaurants, bars, and shops.

== History ==
Ragged Staff Wharf is the quayside of Queensway Quay Marina. It is thought to be the oldest wharf in Gibraltar. While initially built by the Spanish, the wharf was further developed by the British in 1736. First Lord of the Admiralty Sir Charles Wager supervised the improvements at Ragged Staff Wharf, with the goal of providing "better victualling of men-at-war." While there are a number of theories for the derivation of the name of the wharf, none have been proven. One theory is that it originates from the nautical term for the stump mast utilised as a hoist on the vessels that transferred barrels of water to ships at the quay. The wharf was also the site where Governors of Gibraltar would customarily arrive. The steps at that landing place were referred to as Governor's Landing, and are still utilised at the wharf.

Queensway Quay Marina was a Taylor Woodrow development of a former Ministry of Defence site. Construction of phase one of the project, the Queensway Quay residences, just north of the naval docks, started in December 1990 and the marina opened between 1992 and 1994. The first three residential complexes were, in order, Queensway Quay, Cormorant Wharf, and Ordnance Wharf, the last on a historic wharf which is the southern boundary of the marina. In 2000, the marina changed ownership; later, it was enlarged by the construction of The Island, a 13,000 square metre breakwater on reclaimed land opposite Queensway Quay. Nineteen townhouses were built on the breakwater, each with its own swimming pool and 20 metre yacht mooring. The Sails is the most recent development at Queensway Quay Marina. Paul Butler, director of Marina Properties Limited, has been the owner of Queensway Quay Marina since 2000.

== Gallery ==
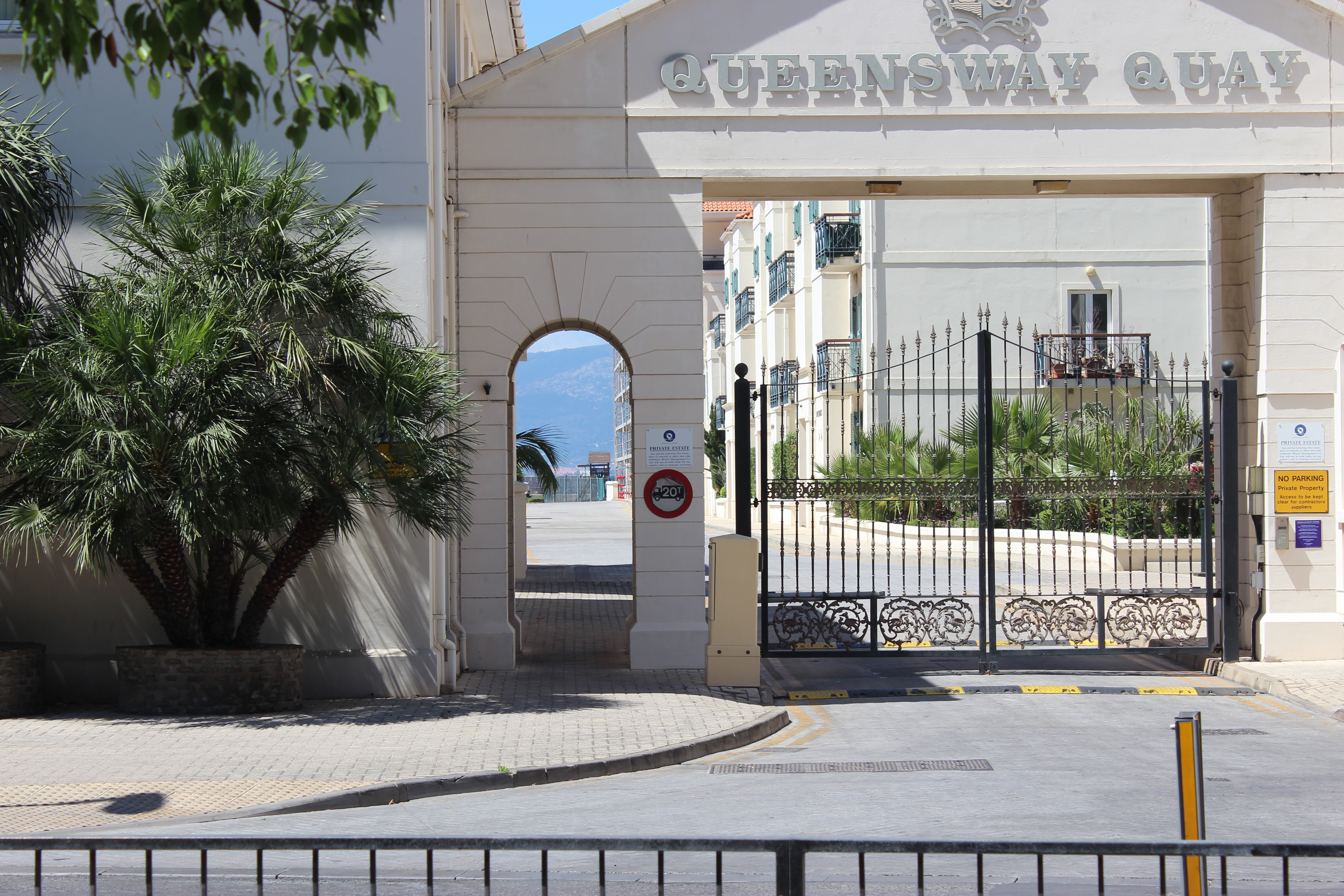
Entrance to Queensway Quay Marina

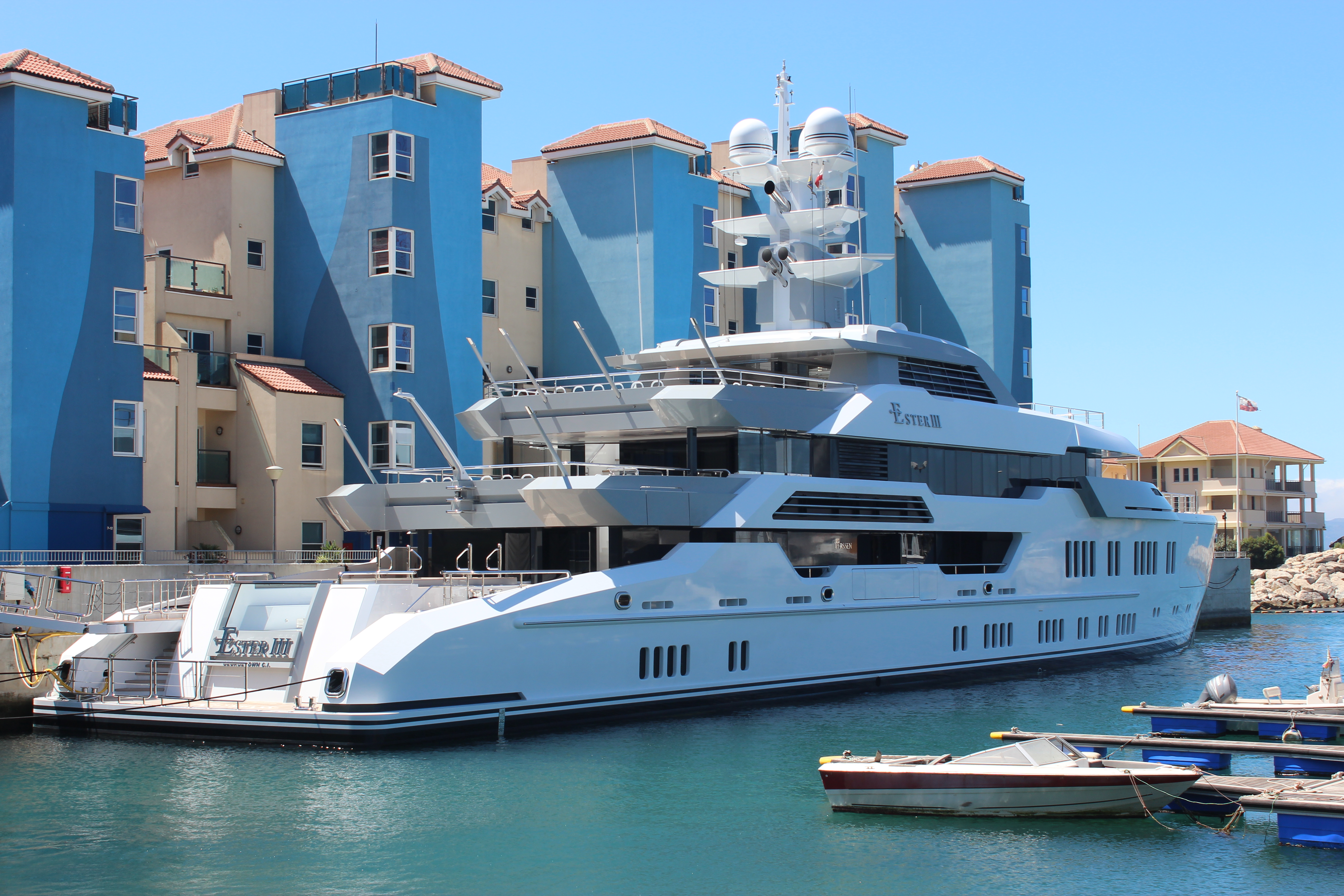
M/Y Ester III berthed by The Sails

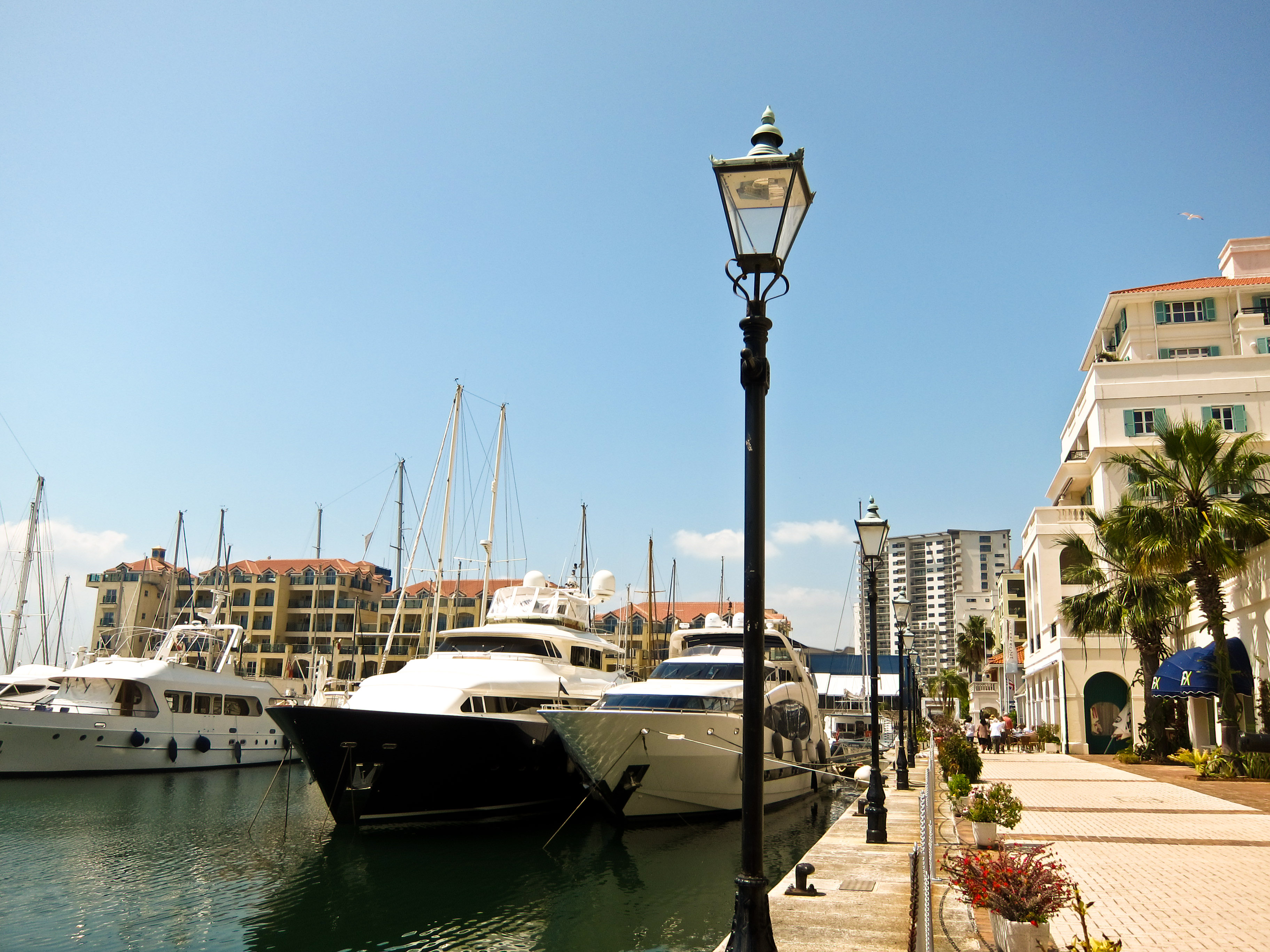
View of Queensway Quay Marina promenade

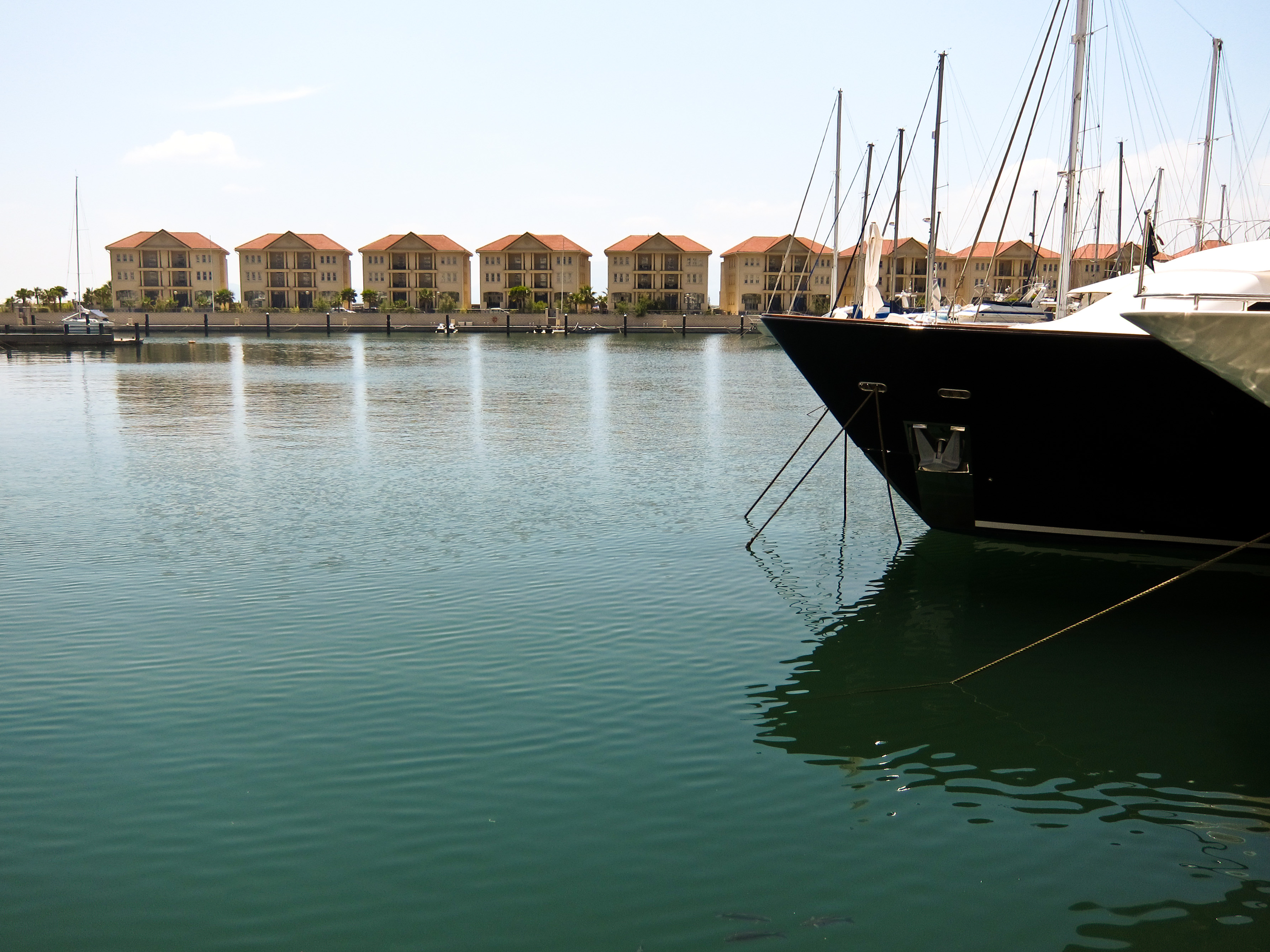
View of The Island residential complex

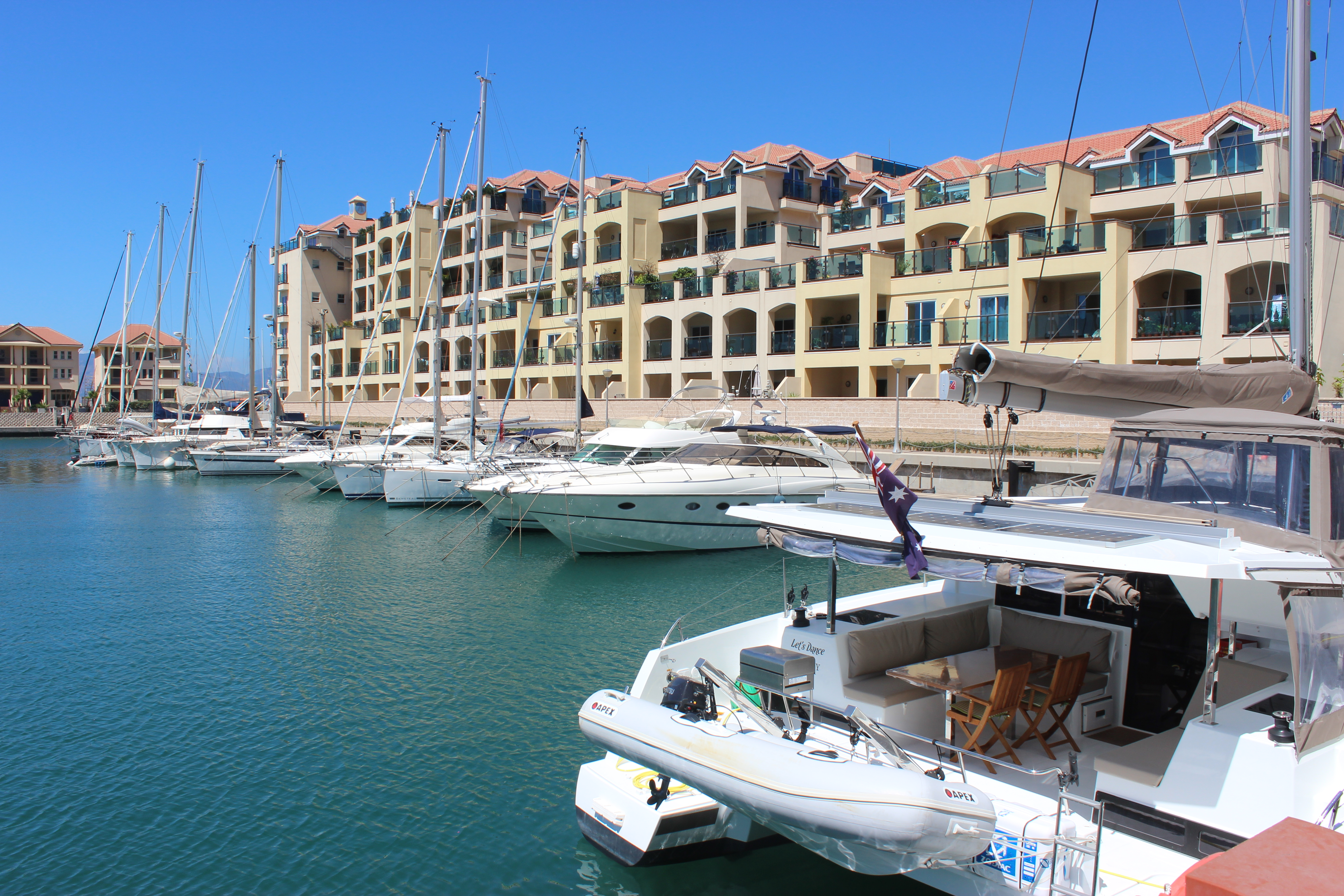
View of The Sails residential complex

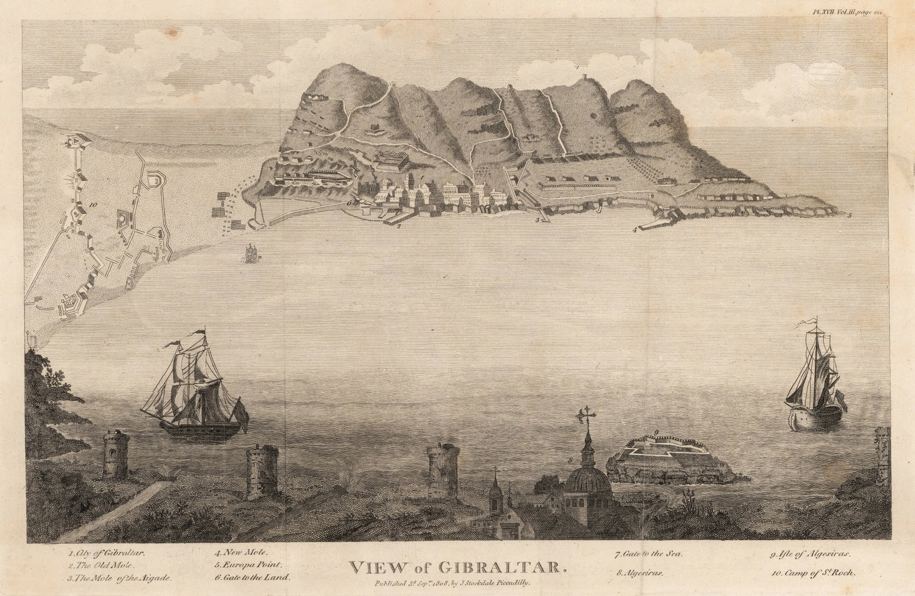
Gibraltar, 1808, with Ragged Staff Wharf labelled as "The Mole of the Aigade"

== See also ==
- Marina Bay, Gibraltar
- Ocean Village Marina, Gibraltar
