= Gibraltar Major Residential Areas =

Suburbs of Gibraltar

Map of Gibraltar

The British Overseas Territory of Gibraltar has no administrative divisions. It is, however, divided into seven Major Residential Areas, which are further divided into 70 numbered Enumeration Areas, used for statistical purposes.

Three Enumeration Areas appear in two Major Residential Areas each:

- Enumeration Area 11 appears in Town Area and Upper Town.
- Enumeration Area 63 appears in Sandpits Area and South District.
- Enumeration Area 64 appears in Reclamation Areas and South District.

The Major Residential Areas are listed below:

Population of Gibraltar in 2012
Major Residential Area	Area km²	Population	% of total	Population Density	Enumeration Areas
Eastside	0.93	526	1.63%	565.59	1
North District	0.74	4,267	13.25%	5762.16	2, 3, 4, 5, 6, 7, 8, 9, 12
Reclamation Areas	0.65	13,356	41.56%	20547.69	64, 65, 66, 67, 68, 69, 70
Sandpits Area	0.53	2,053	6.38%	3873.58	46, 48, 49, 50, 51, 63
South District	1.96	5,681	17.65%	2898.47	47, 52, 53, 54, 55, 56, 57, 58, 59, 60, 61, 62, 63, 64
Town Area	1.40	3,264	10.14%	2331.43	10, 11, 13, 14, 15, 16, 17, 18, 19, 20, 21, 22, 23, 24, 25, 26, 27, 28, 29, 30, 31, 32, 33
Upper Town	0.59	2,457	7.63%	4208.47	11, 34, 35, 36, 37, 38, 39, 40, 41, 42, 43, 44, 45
Total	6.80	31,604	100%	4629.26	1 to 70
