= Town Range =

Road in Gibraltar

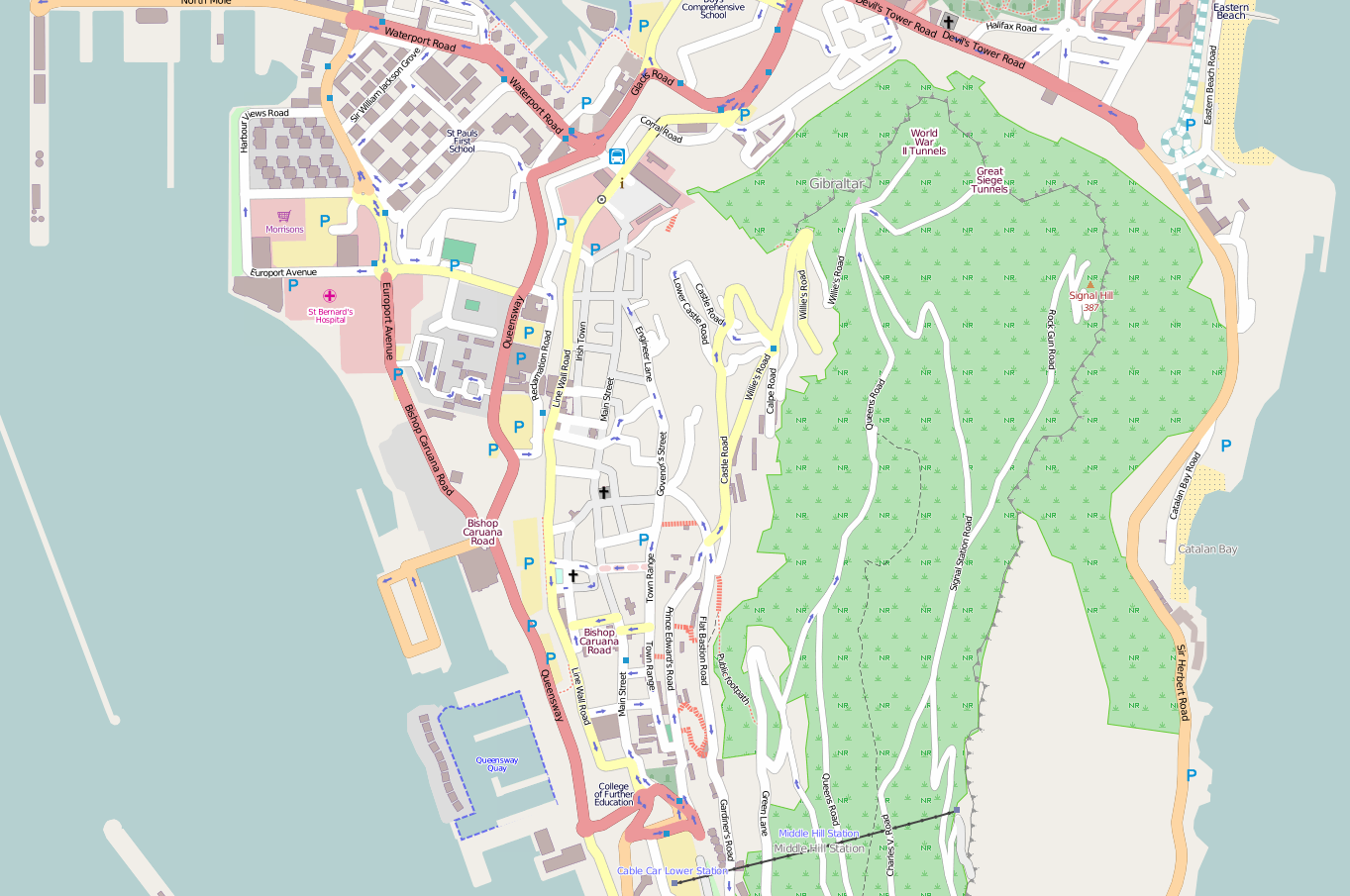

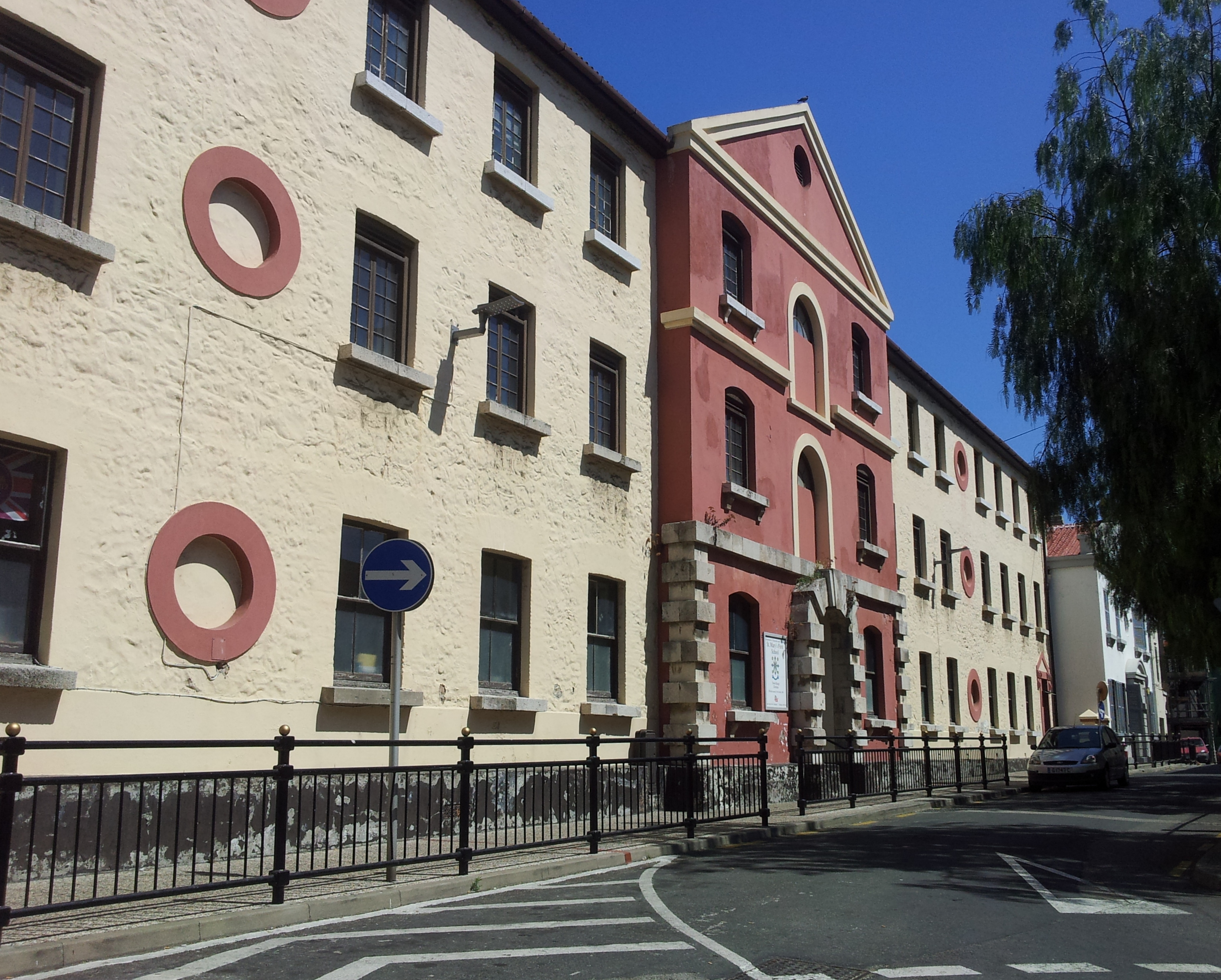
- St Mary's School (within the old Town Range Barracks) on Town Range, Gibraltar
- Interactive map of Town Range
- Location: Gibraltar
- Coordinates: 36.13928°N 5.352359°W
- North: Governor's Street
- East: Prince Edward Street; Library Ramp
- South: Hargrave's Parade; Chelsea Street
- West: Bishop Rapello's Ramp; Library Street; George's Lane

Town Range is a major road in the British Overseas Territory of Gibraltar. It is located in the old town area and runs parallel to Main Street and part of Prince Edward's Road. It is also known in Spanish as Calle Cuartel, in reference to the barracks constructed on the street in 1740. It is one of the three main parallel streets in the old town and is likely to date back to the Moorish period. Until the mid-19th century it was notorious for its filthiness due to wholly inadequate sanitation and lack of any running water supply. It was the point of outbreak of Gibraltar's devastating 1804 epidemic of yellow fever, which killed a third of the territory's population. The street is now a residential and commercial area notable for several important public buildings in addition to the old Georgian barracks, which have been converted for civilian use.

== Description and key buildings ==
Town Range was originally the uppermost of three parallel streets running part-way along the west slope of the Rock of Gibraltar; the lower two are Main Street, which runs the full length of the old town, and Irish Town, which runs from the north end of Gibraltar to about half-way along the old town. The three streets are generally level, although located at different heights on the slope.

The street is the location of the Town Range Barracks, twin blocks built in 1740 to provide accommodation for soldiers with pavilions at each end for their commanding officers. Local historian Tito Benady describes them "as probably the most magnificent buildings of the British period in Gibraltar", although the construction of a mid-Victorian structure erected between Officers Quarters No. III and IV has somewhat spoiled the line of the buildings. The barracks have been converted into a number of commercial and residential properties; one of the barracks blocks is now occupied by St. Mary's School. After the barracks were built the street was renamed as New Barracks Street, which is still reflected in its alternative Spanish name, Calle Cuartel ("Barracks Street"), though the English name was later changed to Town Range.

The rear entrance to 6 Convent Place, the offices of Gibraltar's Chief Minister, is situated on the south side of the street. St Andrew's Church, part of the Church of Scotland's Presbytery of Europe, stands further along the street and was originally constructed to serve the Scottish regiments billeted in the area. At the far north end of the street is the Garrison Library. The Gibraltar Environmental Agency is located at 37 Town Range opposite the Rock on the Rock club; the Gibraltar Senior Citizens Social Club is also located on the street.

Also located on this street are large organisations such as BetVictor and AquaGib based in the Leanse Place building.

== History ==
Town Range is an ancient street, pre-dating the British occupation of Gibraltar. At the time of the Anglo-Dutch Capture of Gibraltar in 1704 it was only fully built on the west side and the east side was mostly still open ground; it was originally called Calle Nueba (New Street) in recognition of its partly developed state. It is shown in a more completed form on the 1720 de la Feuille map and view of Gibraltar. Although the city was largely destroyed in the Great Siege of Gibraltar in 1779–83, Town Range survived as Gibraltar was rebuilt on the same street plan, which remained exactly the same as in Moorish times. During the 19th century the street was one of the districts of the city inhabited by the Jews of Gibraltar, who also settled in the Cooperage in the north end of Gibraltar and around King's Bastion on the waterfront.

The street was once notorious for its filthiness, due to the inadequacies of Gibraltar's water supply. It was the location of the outbreak of the 1804 yellow fever epidemic, which had its origins in a tenement known as Boyd's Buildings that stood on the north end of the street near where the Garrison Library is now. A resident of the overcrowded buildings, which were reputedly "the filthiest spot in Gibraltar", was said to have been infected with yellow fever during a visit to Cádiz. A week later the epidemic broke out in Gibraltar, eventually killing 5,733 people out of a total of around 18,000 – 32 per cent of the population at the time.

Little was done about the sanitary problems; while the epidemic was still raging Lord Nelson suggested to the then governor that the houses at the back of the town should be burned down to root out the disease. An article in the 1831 Edinburgh Medical and Surgical Journal noted Town Range's problems with sewage, remarking that in 1828 "the drains were much filled with filth" and were heavily affected by heavy rain in the month of August. The drain from the soil-pit to the lower square of the Town Range was said to be "choked up, and burst open a short time before the regiment was sent to camp: and, in the King's Bastion, the sewers at the north and south, probably from a want of sufficient declivity, frequently allow the corrupt substances to accumulate at their entrances, and emit during the summer months exhalations". The occupants of the area often complained of the smell emanating from the drains.

Conditions were equally unpleasant for the troops quartered on Town Range. The Royal Engineers were based at the barracks here, and one of the quarters was converted into a married quarters. Reports of the sanitation problems refer to the poor conditions endured by the soldiers, who were said to have been "cooped up in the Town Range, smothered with the dust and the smoke, and deafened by the dirge of mule carts and trucks, and other abominable and unnatural noises". The area's sanitation was finally improved in 1868 with the installation of a new drainage and sewerage system, which included the introduction of George Jennings' flush toilets in the barracks.
