= John Mackintosh (philanthropist) =

John Mackintosh GMH
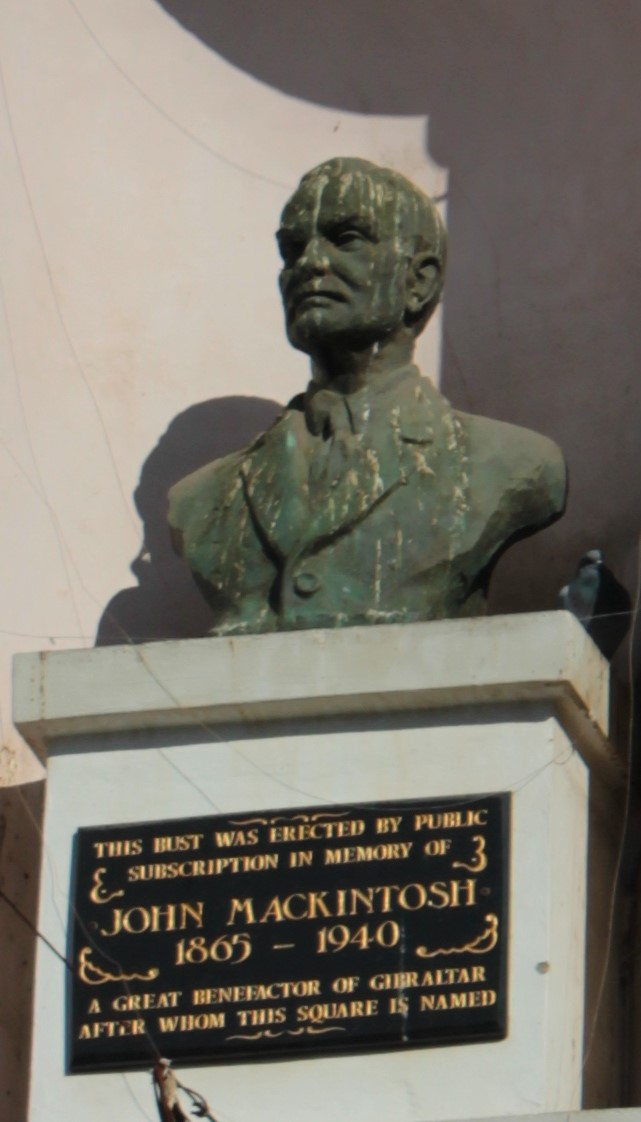
- A Bust of Mackintosh in John Mackintosh Square
- Born: 15 July 1865; 22 Prince Edward's Road, Gibraltar
- Died: 28 February 1940 (aged 74); 22 Prince Edward's Road, Gibraltar
- Monuments: John Mackintosh Square; John Mackintosh Hall
- Occupation: Coaling merchant
- Known for: Philanthropy
- Spouse: Victoria Canepa
- Children: Adelaide

John Mackintosh GMH (15 July 1865 – 28 February 1940) was a Gibraltarian philanthropist and benefactor. He made his money selling coal to the British navy. Mackintosh left his money to charitable institutions such as the Jewish Homes and Mount Alvernia charities which provide residential care for the elderly of Gibraltar.

== Early life ==
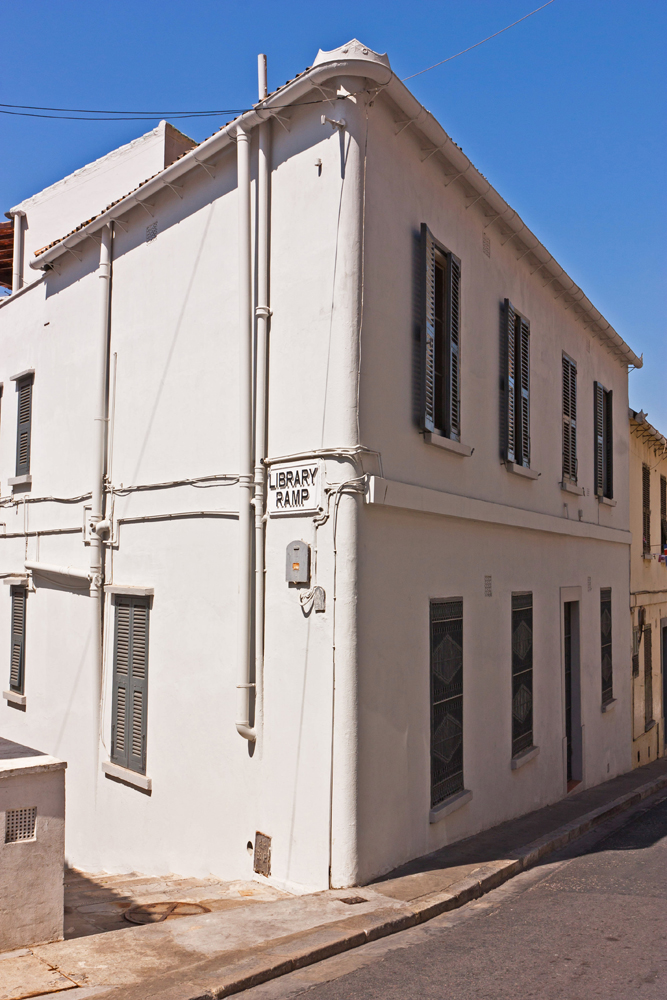
22 Prince Edward's Road in Gibraltar, birthplace, home and place of death of John Mackintosh.

John Mackintosh was born in Gibraltar on 15 July 1865 at 22 Prince Edward's Road, where he spent most of his life. His father, John Mackintosh, a native of Scotland, had settled in Gibraltar to do business as a general merchant. Mackintosh's father died whilst his son was still a boy. His mother, Adelaide Peacock, came from an old Gibraltarian merchant family who were also of Scottish descent. Mackintosh went on to marry Victoria Canepa on 30 June 1909, whose mother was one of the seven Saccone sisters, an affluent family of the times. The couple had an only daughter, Adelaide.

== Career ==
When still young John Mackintosh went to work in the City of London, showing great ability as a businessman and returning to Gibraltar to join his uncle John Peacock in the cotton goods and shipping trade as Peacock & Company. He later entered into partnership with C.W. Mathiesen, Consul for Denmark and shipping agent. This partnership was later followed by that of Crusoe & Mackintosh. The firm prospered as it developed its extensive coal business. Eventually John Mackintosh bought out Crusoe and traded as Mackintosh & Company, a company which he formed into a limited company in 1923, later to be taken over in 1934 by Pyrmont Limited.

Aside from his coal business, John Mackintosh delved into other business activities. He also acquired control of the Chellew Shipping Company, a Cornish company that owned and managed cargo ships. He later formed the Calpean Shipping Company through which he had three cargo ships built during the 1930s, the SS Auretta, the SS Justitia and the MV Statira. He also had a controlling interest in a Newcastle upon Tyne coal business called Thos.H Seed & Company. Mackintosh held the position of Consul for Denmark and Norway for many years. He enjoyed spending his summers abroad in San Sebastian, Switzerland and Pau. Well read and fond of music, Mackintosh was an approachable and popular man.

== Philanthropy ==
John Mackintosh was very public spirited and would support various causes. He was deeply interested in the welfare of his native Gibraltar and addressing the needs of the aged, sick and poor.

=== Will ===
John Mackintosh wrote a will on 6 March 1938 allowing the provision of a public trust for the advancement of education in Gibraltar. He was keen in fostering links between Gibraltar and the United Kingdom, so much so that the educational provisions of his Will were designed to promote and strengthen these ties. Besides the cultural and educational needs of the young Gibraltarians, he provided homes for the aged, poor and for an additional wing to be built as an extension to the then Colonial Hospital. The hospital's John Mackintosh Wing with its 76 additional beds, was opened on 22 September 1969 by the then Governor and Admiral of the fleet Sir Varyl Begg who described it as a:

Magnificent modern hospital splendidly equipped for medical and surgical work including an intensive care unit for medical and surgical work including an intensive care unit for cardiac cases and a nurses training school.

The John Mackintosh Hall cultural centre was opened by Governor and General Sir Alfred Dudley Ward on 8 April 1964, containing a public library, a theatre/conference hall, gymnasium, spacious halls for exhibitions and other public functions, as well as a wing for higher education. The John Mackintosh Homes, comprising three homes to house the aged and poor of different faiths, were opened in April 1964 and are maintained from estate funds vested in three Governors appointed under his Will. The Will also set-up the Scholarship Endowment providing some £20,000 annually for Scholarships and Grants. The Magistrates' Poor Fund vested in the body of Justices of the Peace providing some £4,500 per annum for the indigent.

== Later life and death ==
Victoria shared her husband's many successes, supporting him in adversity and taking care of him in his autumn years, when his health began to fail him. He died at the same house in which he was born, on 28 February 1940, and the whole fortress mourned his loss. The centrally located John Mackintosh Square was later named after him by a grateful public.

== Honours and memorials ==
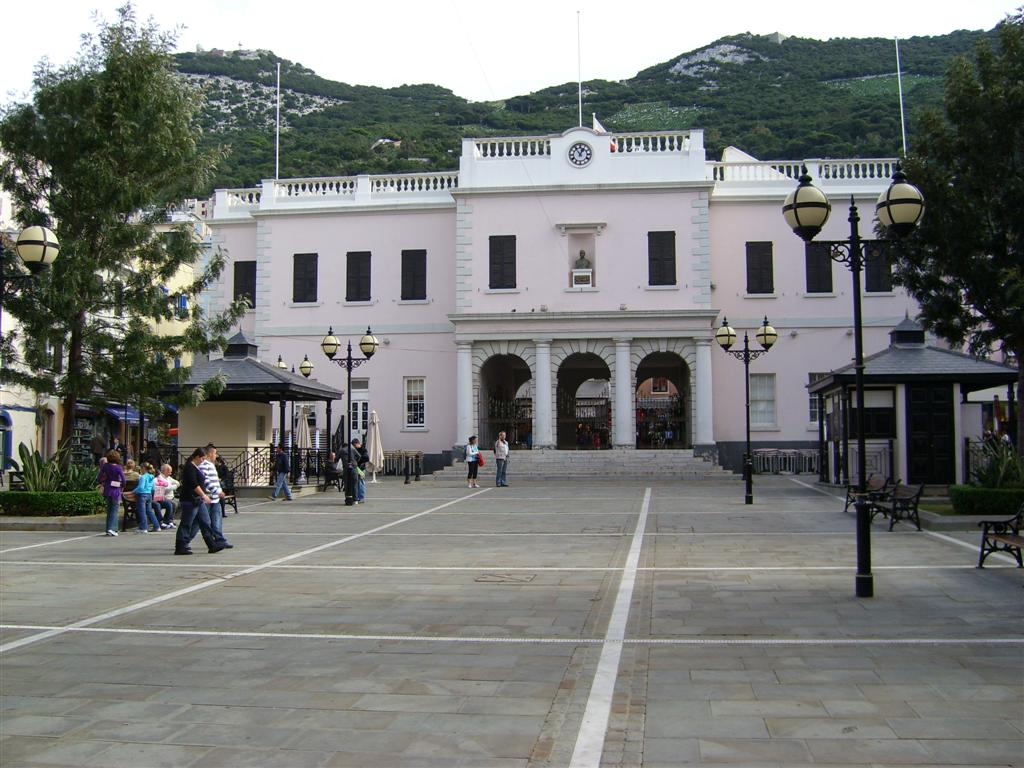
John Mackintosh Square was named after the Gibraltarian philanthropist John Mackintosh.

A bust and plaque memorial to his name was unveiled on the western façade of the House of Assembly (now the Gibraltar Parliament) building facing the square in April, 1974. Mackintosh was posthumously awarded the Gibraltar Medallion of Honour by Parliament for his services to philanthropy and officially announced by Mayor of Gibraltar, Solomon Levy, on National Day 2008.

=== Legacy ===
His name is given to:

- John Mackintosh Hall
- John Mackintosh Square
- John Mackintosh Ward in St Bernard's Hospital

In addition the national sports stadium, Victoria Stadium, was named after his wife.
