= Brentonico =

- Comune
- Comune di Brentonico
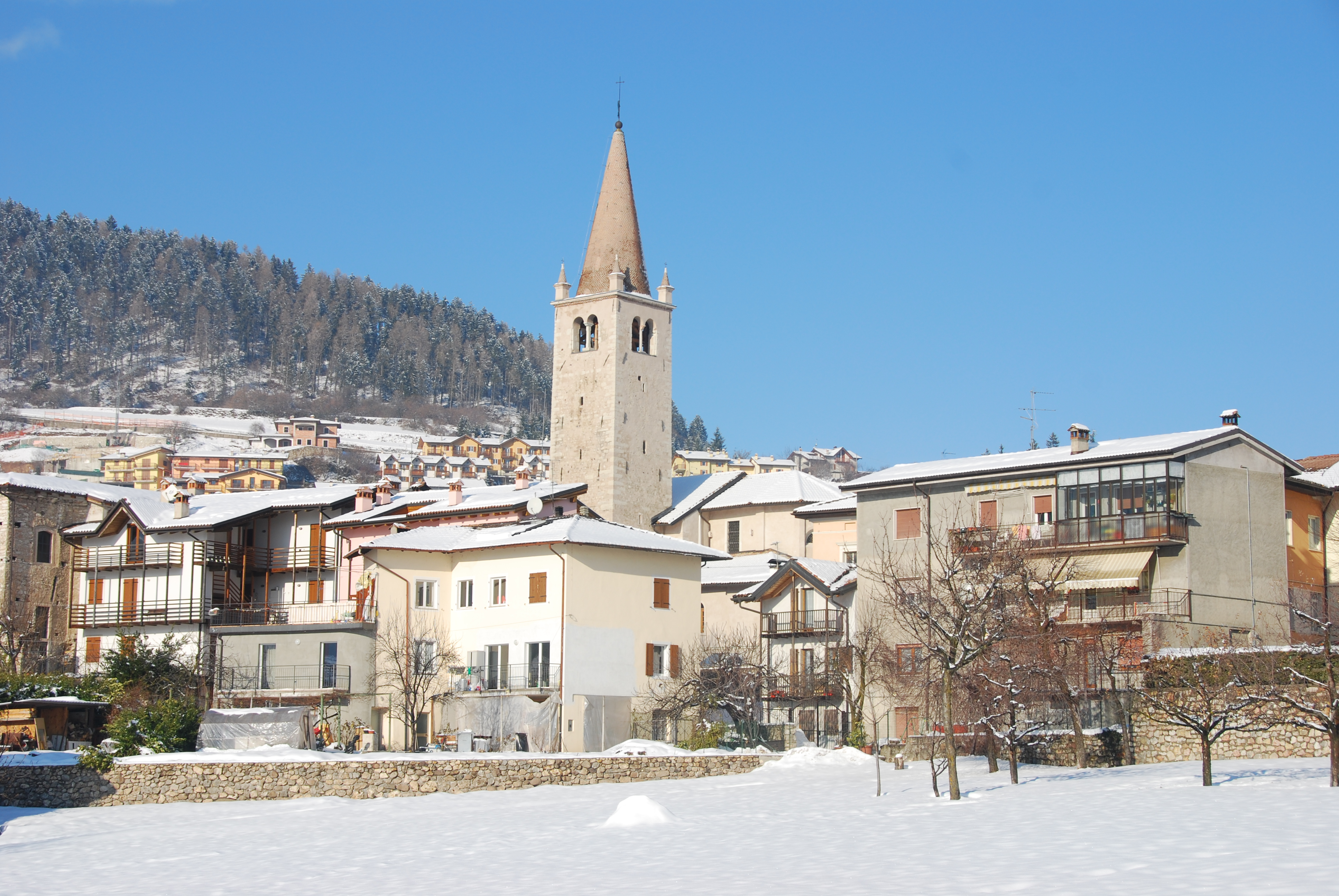
- Brentonico under the snow

- Location within Italy Location within Trentino-Alto Adige/Südtirol
- Coordinates: 45°49′N 10°57′E
- Country: Italy
- Region: Trentino-Alto Adige/Südtirol
- Province: Trentino (TN)
- Frazioni: Saccone, Fontechel, Crosano, Cazzano, Castione, Corné, Prada, Sorne, S.Giacomo, S.Valentino, Polsa

Government
  - Mayor: Mauro Tonolli

Area
  - Total: 62.6 km^{2} (24.2 sq mi)
- Elevation: 698 m (2,290 ft)

Population (2026)
  - Total: 4,184
  - Density: 66.8/km^{2} (173/sq mi)
- Demonym: Brentegani
- Time zone: UTC+1 (CET)
  - Summer (DST): UTC+2 (CEST)
- Postal code: 38060
- Dialing code: 0464
- Patron saint: Saint Peter and Saint Paul
- Saint day: 29 June
- Website: Official website

Brentonico (Brentònec in local dialect) is a comune (municipality) in Trentino in the northern Italian region Trentino-Alto Adige, located about 30 kilometres (19 mi) southwest of Trento. As of 31 December 2004, it had a population of 3,770 and an area of 62.6 square kilometres (24.2 mi^{2}).

The municipality of Brentonico contains the frazioni (subdivisions, mainly villages and hamlets) Saccone, Fontechel, Crosano, Cazzano, Castione, Corné, Prada, Sorne, S.Giacomo, S.Valentino, and Polsa.

Brentonico borders the following municipalities: Mori, Nago-Torbole, Malcesine, Ala, and Avio.

== Demographic evolution ==
Historical population

Year	Pop.	±%
1861	?	—
1871	?	—
1881	?	—
1901	?	—
1911	?	—

Year	Pop.	±%
1921	4,145	—
1931	3,956	−4.6%
1936	3,743	−5.4%
1951	3,703	−1.1%
1961	3,353	−9.5%

Year	Pop.	±%
1971	3,108	−7.3%
1981	3,161	+1.7%
1991	3,254	+2.9%
2001	3,620	+11.2%

Source: Data from ISTAT
