= John Mac =

John Mac may refer to:

- John McCarthy (conductor) (1916–2009), British choral music conductor
- John Mackintosh Hall, the main cultural centre of Gibraltar
- John McDonogh High School, a school in New Orleans
