= Nun's Well, Gibraltar =

Underground water reservoir in Gibraltar

Nun's Well
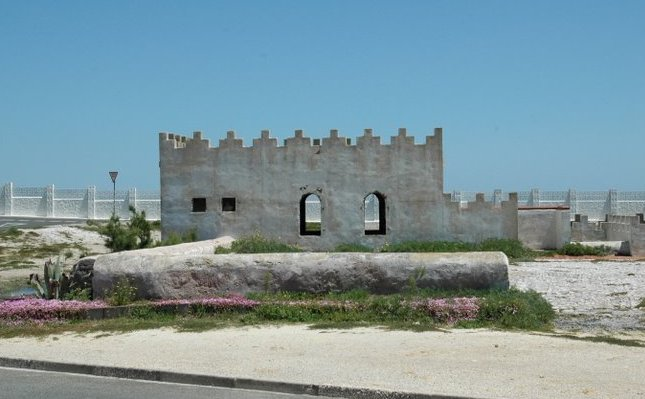
- Nun's Well at Europa Point

- Location within Gibraltar

General information
- Status: Restored
- Location: Europa Point, Gibraltar
- Coordinates: 36.111556°N 5.345739°W
- Construction started: Moorish Period (Before 1462)
- Renovated: 1988
- Owner: Government of Gibraltar

Renovating team
- Structural engineer: Royal Engineers

Nun's Well is an ancient underground water reservoir in the British Overseas Territory of Gibraltar. It is located at Europa Point, and is thought to be of the Moorish period. It represents some of the earliest evidence of an artificial water supply in Gibraltar. The name of the cistern is thought to be derived from the nuns associated with the Shrine of Our Lady of Europe. In the eighteenth century, Nun's Well supplied the military with water. In the early nineteenth century, it provided water for the brewery that was built next door. In 1988, the Royal Engineers constructed what is now the main building, which has a castle-like appearance. Nun's Well became the focus of controversy during the 2010–2011 restoration of the site.

== Early history ==
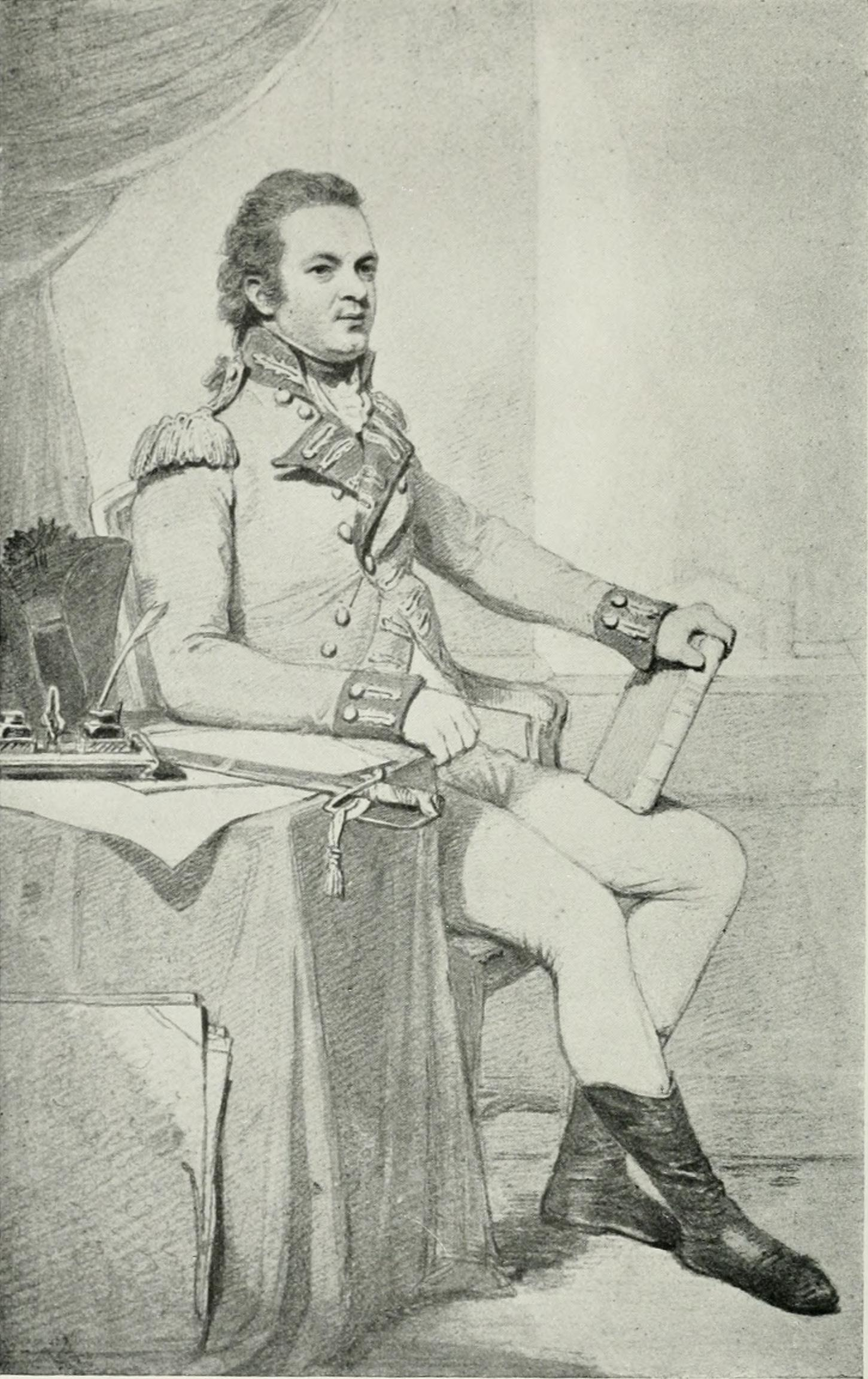
John Drinkwater Bethune

Nun's Well is an ancient subterranean water reservoir in Gibraltar, the British Overseas Territory at the southern end of the Iberian Peninsula. It is located at Europa Point, the southernmost portion of Gibraltar. The cistern is on Europa New Road at Europa Flats, across from the south entrance to Keightley Way Tunnel, just south of the Ibrahim-al-Ibrahim Mosque. On the east side of the structure, the reservoir is accessed by stairs which lead to a door constructed at the underground level. The water reservoir includes a pair of large underground arched chambers into which ground water was permitted to drain. Nun's Well is thought to be of the Moorish period, and represents some of the earliest evidence of the attempts to provide a water supply in Gibraltar.

It is thought that the name of the cistern originated with the nuns who previously cared for the Shrine of Our Lady of Europe, another historic site at Europa Point. Nun's Well is also in proximity to the Europa Point Lighthouse.

In 1753, Governor of Gibraltar Humphrey Bland ordered that the chambers be cleaned. Afterwards, the reservoir supplied the military with water. Nun's Well was described in the second edition of the journal of British officer and military historian John Drinkwater Bethune, A history of the late siege of Gibraltar, published in 1786.

"Towards Europa advance is a Moorish bath, called by the garrison, the Nuns well. It is sunk eight feet deep in the rock, is 72 feet long, and 42 feet broad, and, to preserve the water, has an arched roof, supported by pillars."

== Nineteenth century ==
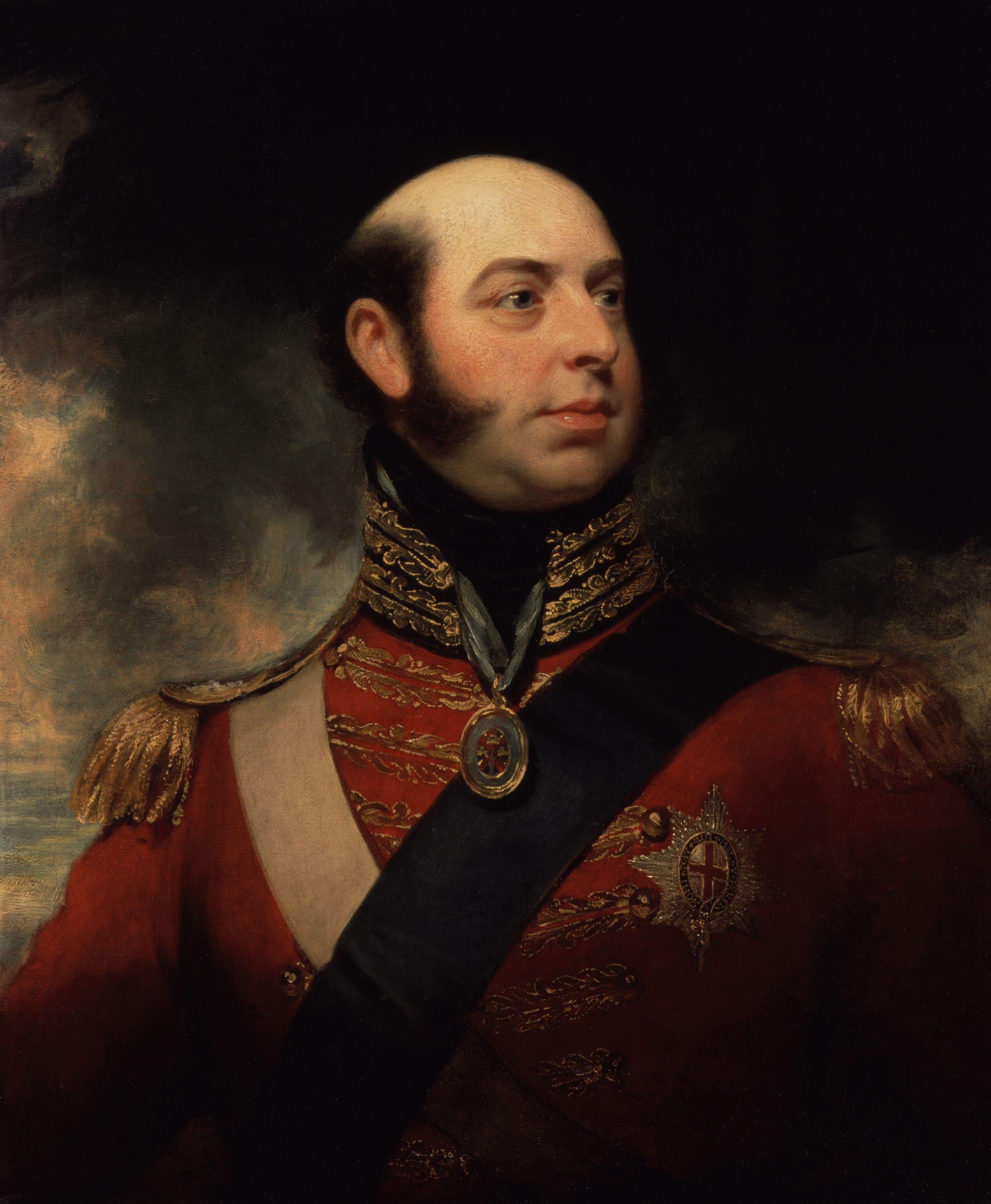
Prince Edward, Duke of Kent

Prince Edward, the Duke of Kent (2 November 1767 – 23 January 1820), later the father of Queen Victoria, arrived in Gibraltar for the second time in May 1802. His first arrival had been in 1790 as an officer; his second stay at Gibraltar was as Governor, following the death of Governor General Charles O'Hara. Prince Edward was ordered by his brother Prince Frederick, Duke of York to restore discipline at the garrison, as the soldiers spent much of their time inebriated. Before the prince's arrival, Gibraltar had ninety-two taverns which served its approximately 7,000 civilians and soldiers. After his arrival, he closed down the majority of the wine houses that had been frequented by the soldiers. In addition, the Governor ordered that all the remaining taverns be off-limits for the soldiers except for three: The Three Light Infantrymen, The Halfway House, and the Three Guns. He established a brewery at Europa Point, next to Nun's Well. His brewery was known as Brewery Yard or Brewers Yard, and used water from Nun's Well. It was the source of "a wholesome supply of Beer for the Troops." The Duke of Kent was recalled to England in the spring of 1803. Later, in 1805, the brewery was converted into military barracks. The Italian architect Giovanni Maria Boschetti has been credited with demolishing the brewery and constructing a barracks in its place.

In the mid nineteenth century, Nun's Well was described by Spanish historian Ignacio López de Ayala in his History of Gibraltar, published in 1845.

"To the Eastward, and near the Virgen de Europa, was an admirably constructed Cistern or tank for receiving water; so magnificent and of such noble architecture, that it is difficult to divine whether it was the work of the Moors, or of more ancient times. Its shape is that of a Trapezium, seventy-eight feet long, forty-two and forty-eight in width, and eight feet high. Twenty-two solid pillars support the roof, and the descent is by steps, built of bricks. The whole exhibits the result of great perseverance and industry, for it is excavated in a solid rock, and no other place near to it seems fit for such an undertaking. The water collected there is good, and remains sweet throughout the year; but the Cistern has suffered much from the effects of time. (It is still used as a tank, and now bears the name of the Nun's Well.)"

== Recent history ==
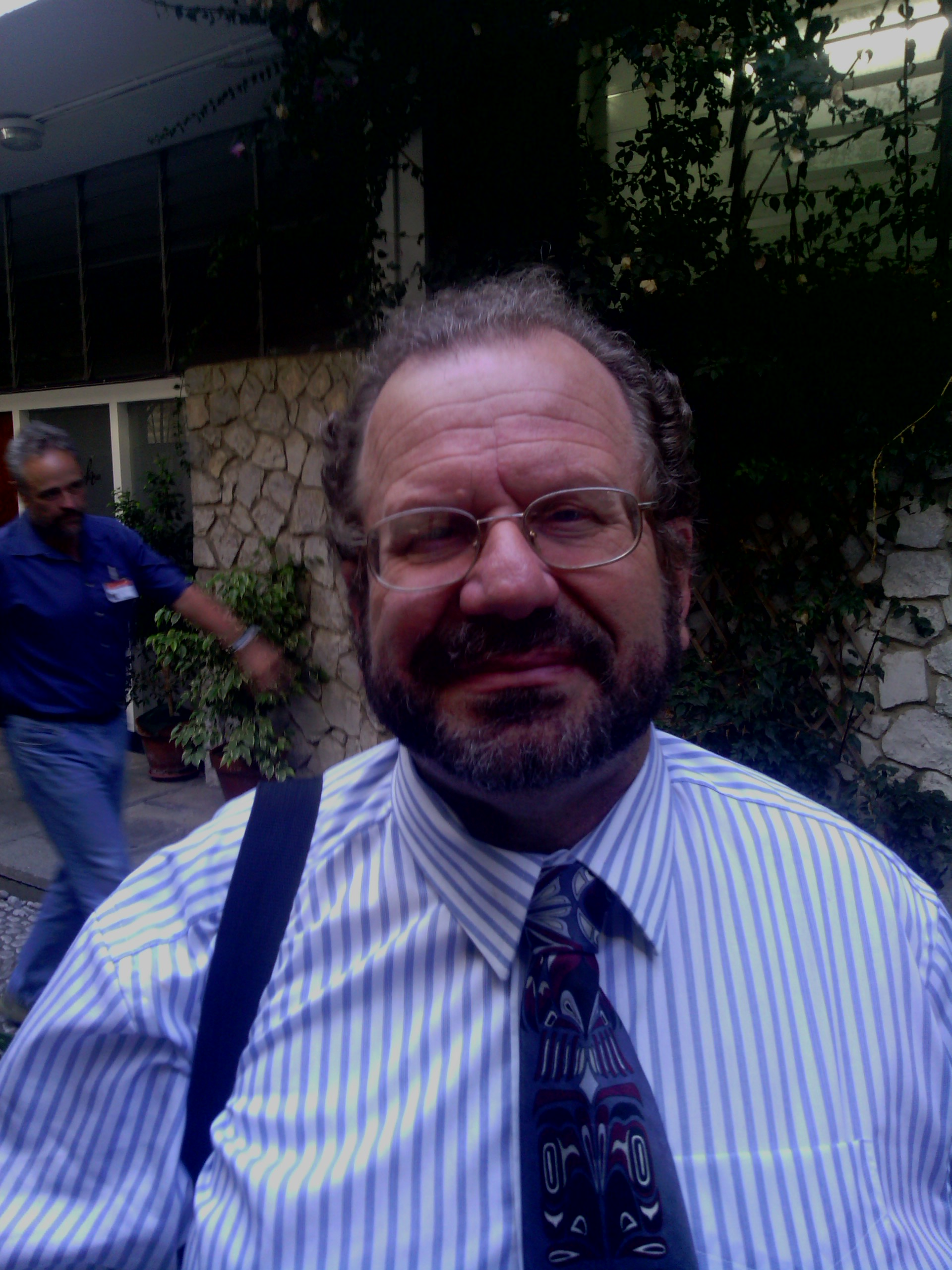
John Cortes

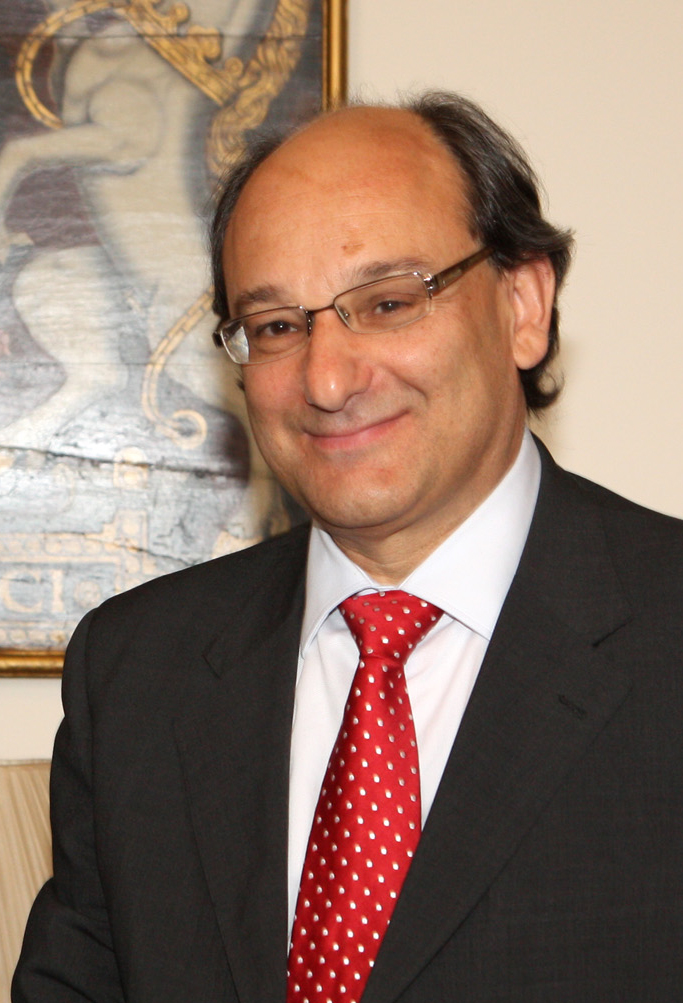
Peter Caruana

In the early twentieth century, the military barracks next to the Nun's Well site, referred to as Brewery Barracks, was reported to be in an "insanitary" condition. Discussions at Parliament further indicated that large amounts of money had already been spent on the barracks, and that they were scheduled to be replaced.

In May 1987, the Royal Engineers conducted an investigation of the Nun's Well site. The following year, the Royal Engineers constructed what is now the main building. It has a castle-like appearance; its addition was part of a general restoration of the site. The site of the previous brewery and later barracks is now open ground which is used by the military for target practice. While the reservoir had been thought to fill with water that drains along the fractures of the nearby Beefsteak Fault, recent investigation has led researchers to believe that it fills with a combination of rain, street flushing, and sea spray, particularly during levanter winds.

In 2010, the Government of Gibraltar requested that the Gibraltar Ornithological and Natural History Society (GONHS) make suggestions for the landscaping of Europa Point, as the government was intent on restoring the site. A report was completed and contractors transplanted vegetation to the area by Nun's Well to be tended while awaiting replanting. However, irrigation was not provided for the landscaping plants, with the result that most of the plants at Nun's Well died. Another thousand plants that replaced them were also neglected and largely died. Concurrently, an adjacent area which was covered with the strictly protected Gibraltar Sea Lavender (Limonium emarginatum) had rubble dumped upon it. The errors were compounded when replacement planting took place in the heat of summer, and dumping of rubble on the lavender continued. The society contended that the events which transpired were against both the government's own Environment Charter and Environmental Action and Management Plan.

In October 2011, the council of the Gibraltar Ornithological and Natural History Society declined an invitation for its General Secretary John Cortes to attend the inauguration of the recently restored Europa Point. The reasons cited included the destruction of the habitat, the flouting of laws relating to the removal of Gibraltar's protected species, and the ignoring of solicited advice on landscaping with salt-resistant native plants. The decision was criticised by Chief Minister Peter Caruana as a "political stunt." Caruana's statements were denounced by the GONHS as a "vitriolic attack" and a spokesman indicated that their society was an "apolitical ... independent NGO" (non-governmental organisation).

== Gallery ==
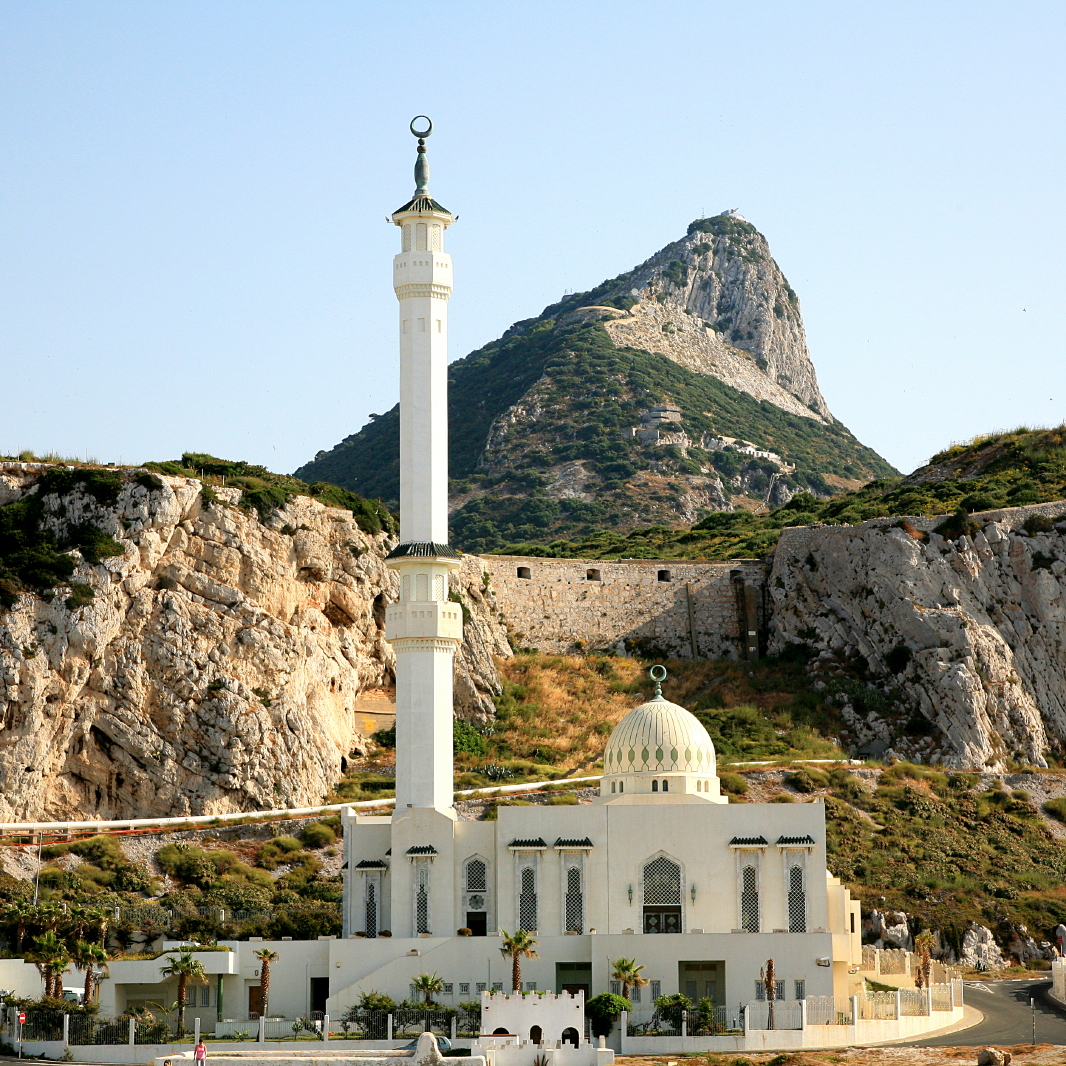
Ibrahim-al-Ibrahim Mosque

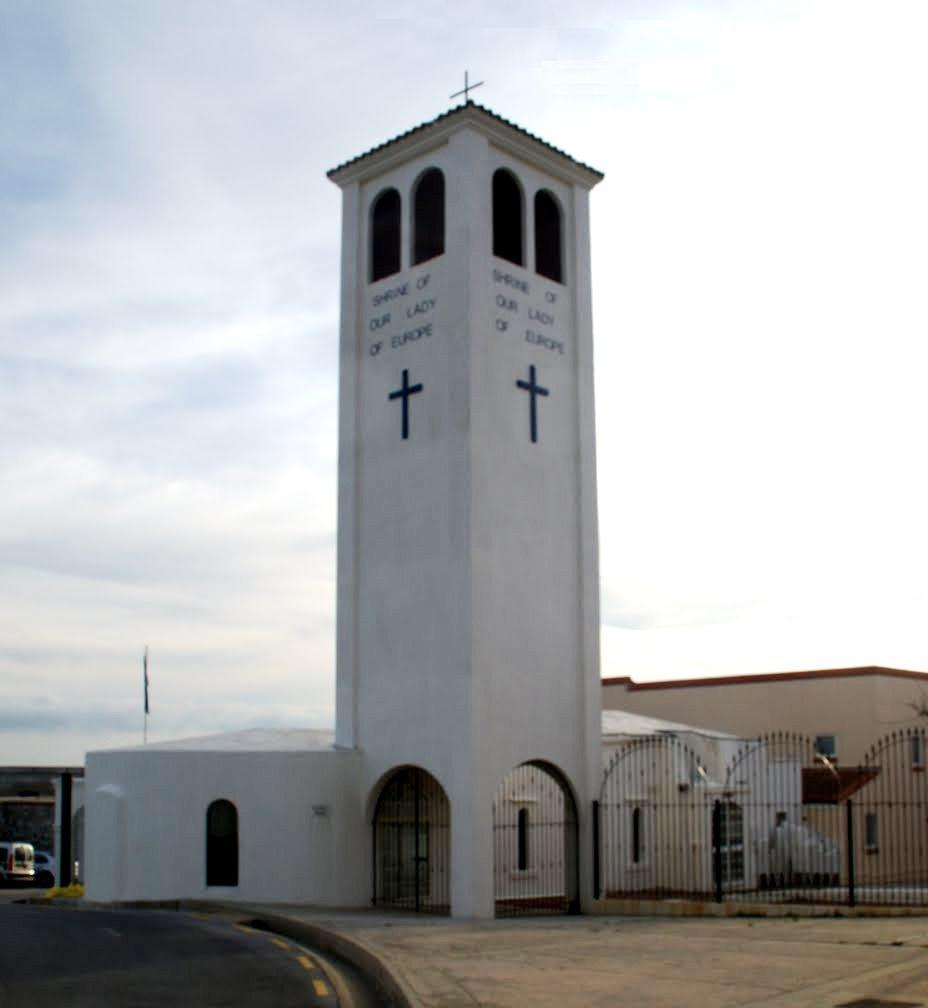
Shrine of Our Lady of Europe

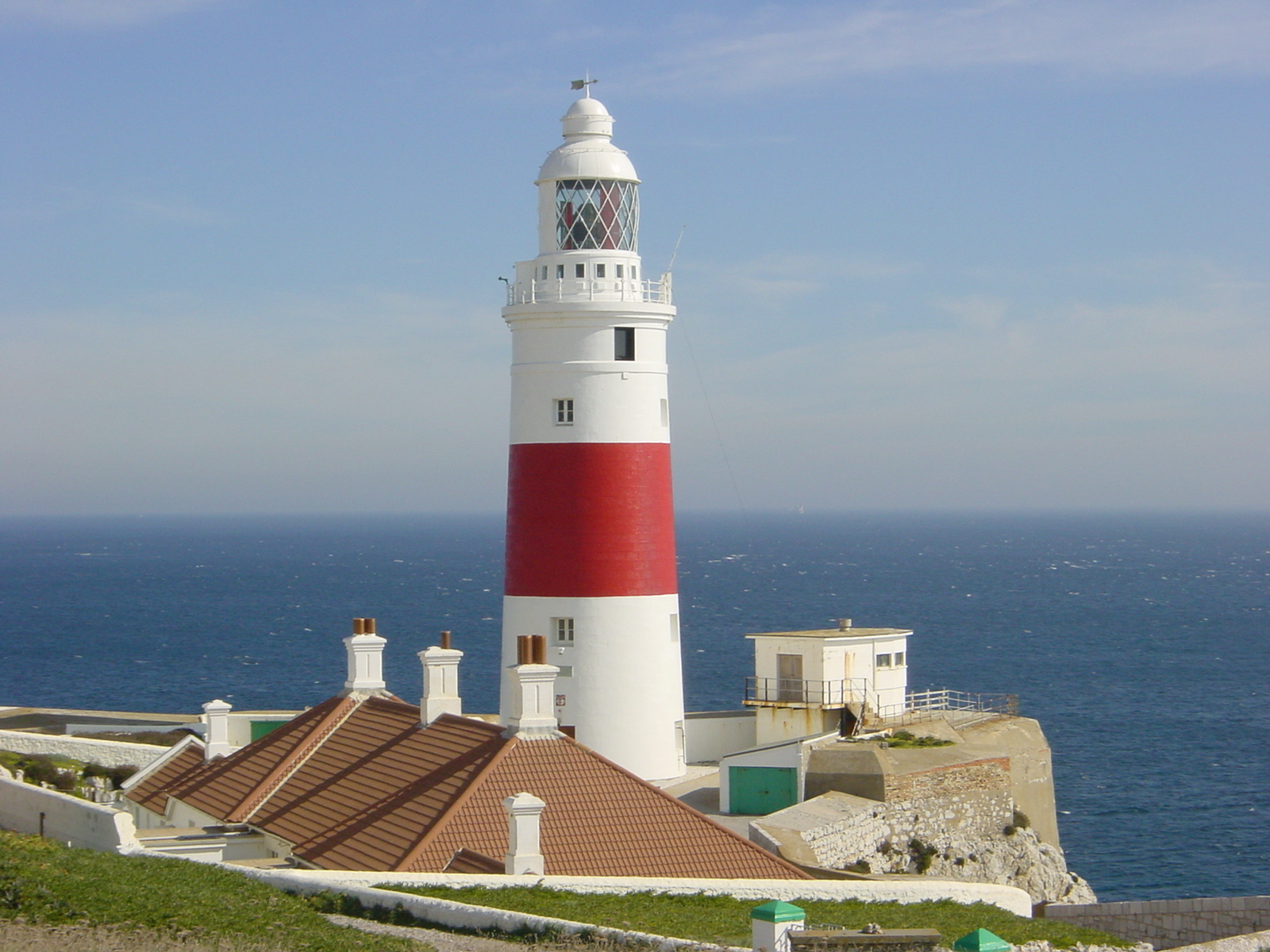
Europa Point Lighthouse
