= John Mackintosh Hall =

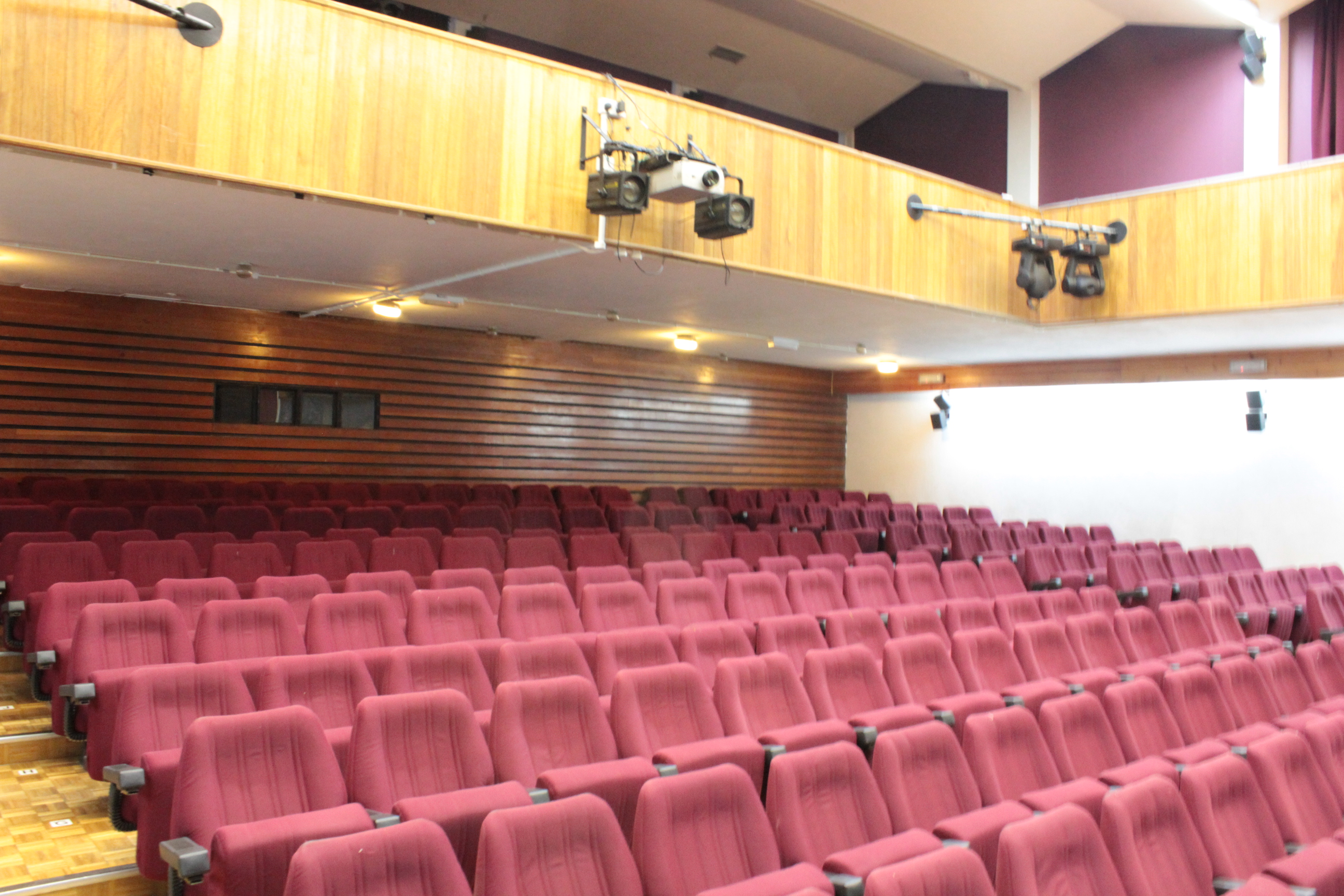
- Main auditorium

- Location within Gibraltar
- Established: 8 April 1964
- Location: 308 Main Street, Gibraltar
- Coordinates: 36.13558°N 5.35332°W
- Type: Cultural centre
- Director: Seamus Byrne

The John Mackintosh Hall, known as the John Mac Hall to locals, is the main cultural centre in the British Overseas Territory of Gibraltar. It consists of a public library, a theatre, conference hall, and several multi-purpose spaces.

== History ==
The hall was built on the site the old military Grand Stores as that building had been damaged by the explosion in 1951 caused by RFA Bedenham which killed 13 people.

Its name pays tribute to Gibraltarian philanthropist John Mackintosh, who in his will left a bequest to build a place that would strengthen the cultural and educational ties between Gibraltar and the United Kingdom.

The John Mackintosh Hall was opened to the public by the then Governor, General Sir Dudley Ward, on 8 April 1964. The building's architectural style follows the Mediterranean architectural traditions, with a series of interconnected courtyards where the sunlight and the heat of the summer months is controlled with the use of trees, shaded areas and fountains.

Although it was originally designed as an educational institution specifically for the benefit of Gibraltar's youth, it has over time been adapted to also cater for various adult cultural events. The library was expanded and the theatre can now host conferences and lectures, besides musical performances.

The two major plays written in Gibraltar, "La Lola se va pá Londre" and "Connie con cama camera en el comedor," both by Elio Cruz, debuted in the John Mackintosh Hall in 1966 and 1969 respectively.
