= Prince Edward's Road =

Road in Gibraltar

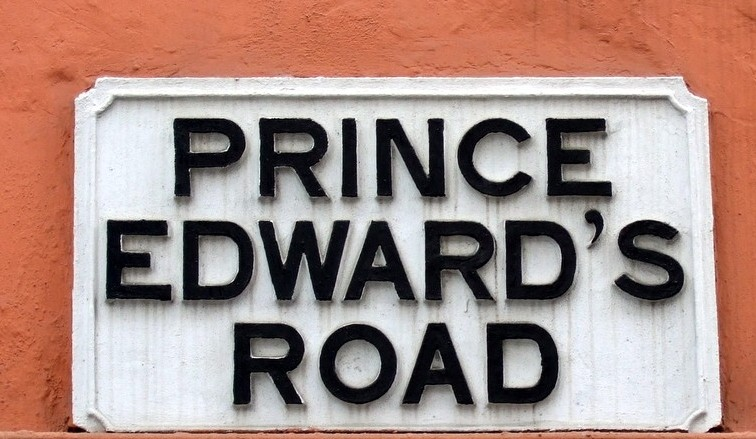

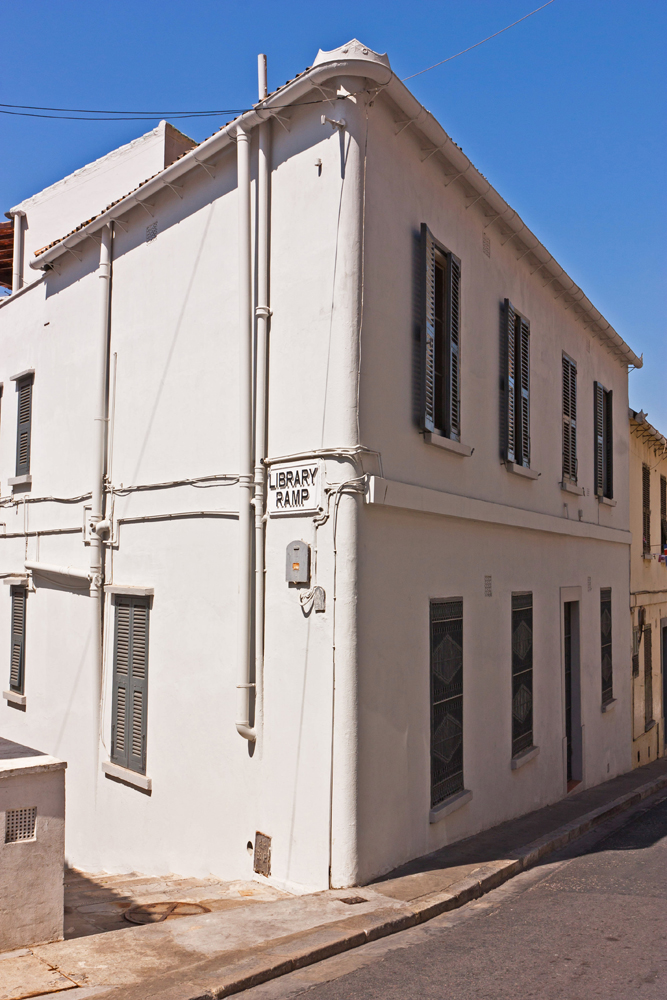
22 Prince Edward's Road in Gibraltar, birthplace, home and place of death of local philanthropist John Mackintosh.

Prince Edward's Road is a one-way road in the British Overseas Territory of Gibraltar. It mostly runs between Town Range and Flat Bastion Road. It starts at the northern end of Europa Road by Hargrave's Parade to Governor's Street with a junction joining onto Flat Bastion and Castle Road at its highest elevation. Several houses here and Gowland's Ramp are listed buildings and mostly date to the 1890s.

Local businessman and philanthropist John Mackintosh was born, lived at, and died at 22 Prince Edward's Road.
