= Water supply and sanitation in Gibraltar =

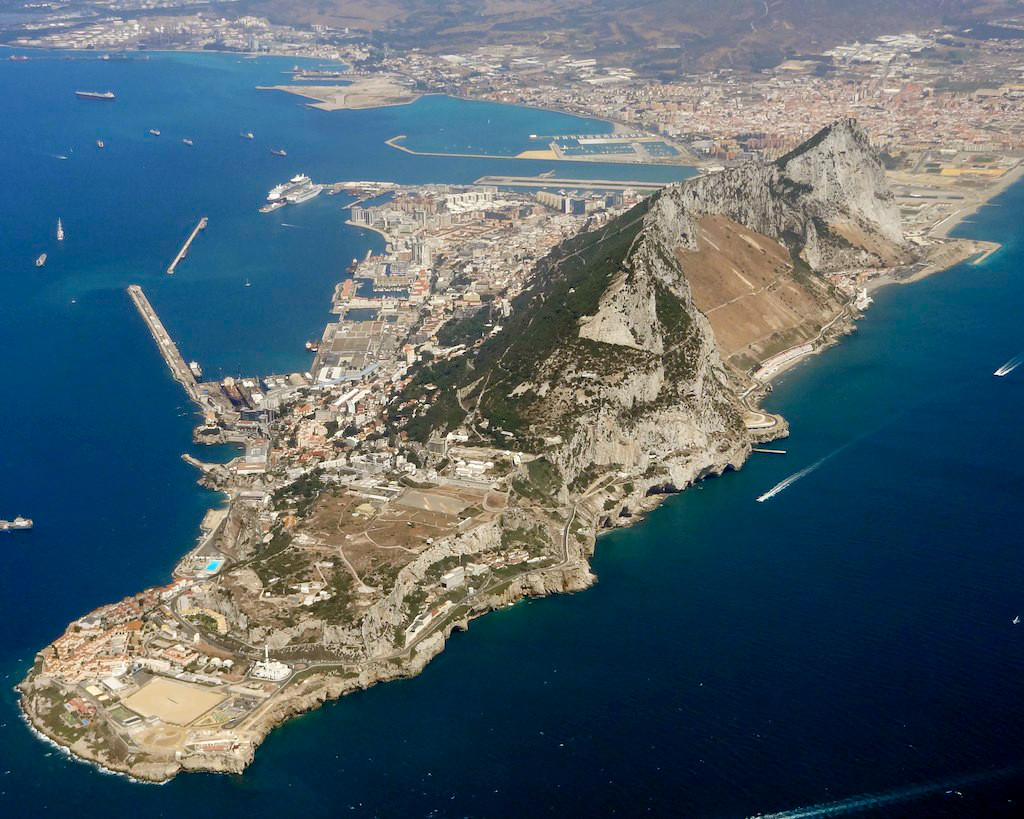
Aerial view of Gibraltar from the south-east

Water supply and sanitation in Gibraltar have been major concerns for its inhabitants throughout its history, from medieval times to the present day. The climate of Gibraltar is a mild Mediterranean one with warm dry summers and cool wet winters. Since daily records of rainfall began in 1790, annual rainfall has averaged a mean of 838 millimetres (33.0 in) with the highest volumes in December and the lowest in July. However, most of Gibraltar's small land area is occupied by the Rock of Gibraltar, a limestone outcrop that is riddled with caves and crevices. There are no rivers, streams, or large bodies of water on the peninsula, which is connected to Spain via a narrow sandy isthmus.

Gibraltar's water supply was formerly provided by a combination of an aqueduct, wells, and the use of cisterns, barrels and earthenware pots to capture rainwater. This became increasingly inadequate as Gibraltar's population grew in the 18th and 19th centuries; the settlement was a breeding ground for lethal diseases such as cholera and yellow fever, which killed thousands of its inhabitants and members of the British garrison in repeated outbreaks. In the late 19th century, a Sanitary Commission instigated major improvements which saw the introduction of large-scale desalination and the use of giant water catchments covering over 2.5 million square feet (nearly 250,000 m^{2}). Today Gibraltar's supply of drinking water comes entirely from desalination, with a separate supply of saltwater for sanitary purposes—both supplies are delivered from huge underground reservoirs excavated under the Rock of Gibraltar.

== Under Moorish and Spanish rule ==
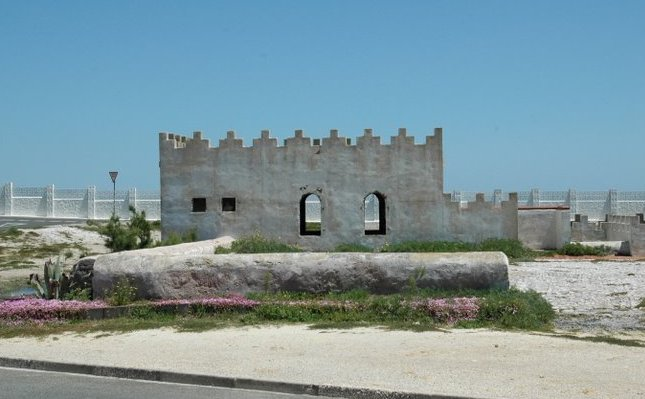
Nun's Well, thought to be the oldest surviving water storage structure in Gibraltar

Gibraltar was uninhabited during ancient times due in part to a lack of easily accessible water to support a permanent population, but in the 11th century the Moors established a fortified stronghold there in response to military threats from the Christian kingdoms of Aragon and Castile. The Moors obtained water through roof catchment of rainfall, shallow wells in the Quaternary sands to the west of the Rock of Gibraltar, and storing local surface runoff in cisterns. In the 14th century they constructed an aqueduct that collected water from the Red Sands, an area south of the town in the vicinity of what is now the Gibraltar Botanic Gardens, and transported it some 1,350 metres (4,430 ft) to a fountain within the town. Fountain Ramp, on the western side of John Mackintosh Square, preserves in its name the location of the aqueduct's original terminus.

After the Crown of Castile conquered Gibraltar in the 15th century, the aqueduct was renovated and a pair of reservoirs was constructed around 1694. A medieval reservoir, Nun's Well, still survives at Europa Point in the far south of Gibraltar, though it is unclear who built it and when. In the 1770s, Thomas James recorded that it was infested with leeches. This caused problems for the soldiers who had to drink the water, as the leeches attached themselves to the soldiers' tongues "and sucking for sustenance, caused the discharge of blood, which ... frightened some of the men not a little."

The only other source of freshwater was from wells bored into the isthmus with Spain, which produced non-potable water. During the 19th century, the public could draw water for a fee but this supply was taxed by the British. A few dwellings, mainly those occupied by British officials, had their own private wells. However, most of the population had to rely on the public wells, from where they drew water which they carried back into the town. The water level gradually receded during the dry summer months, and sometimes it dried up altogether if precipitation during the year had been lower than usual.

Historical sources conflict on exactly how much groundwater was available in Gibraltar. A 17th-century Spanish writer, Alonso Hernández del Portillo, asserts that "the city contained many tides and fountains of very sweet and healthy water" and that "fountains of fresh water could be seen spouting out of the sea near the foot of the Rock", possibly referring to a spring at a fault called the Orillon (at the site of the later Orillon Batteries) in the north-west face of the Rock. By the mid-19th century, however, the British writer Frederick Sayer was reporting that "there are no springs of pure fresh water"; the supplies from the few shallow wells that did exist would have been brackish at best. What is certain, however, is that by Sayer's time the existing water supplies were increasingly inadequate as Gibraltar's civilian population increased rapidly.

== Under British rule ==
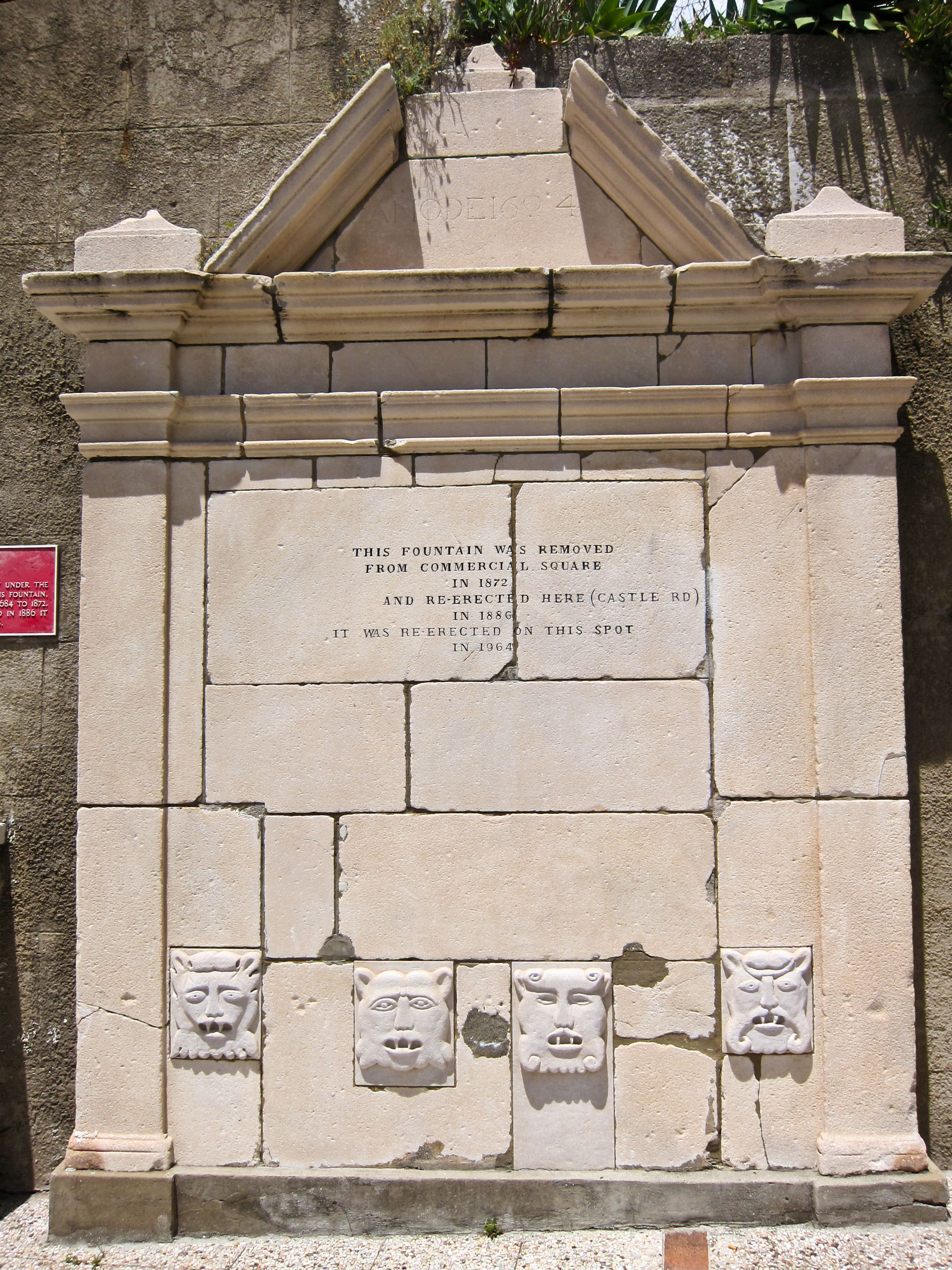
A former Spanish fountain with gargoyles in Gibraltar, used from 1684 to 1962

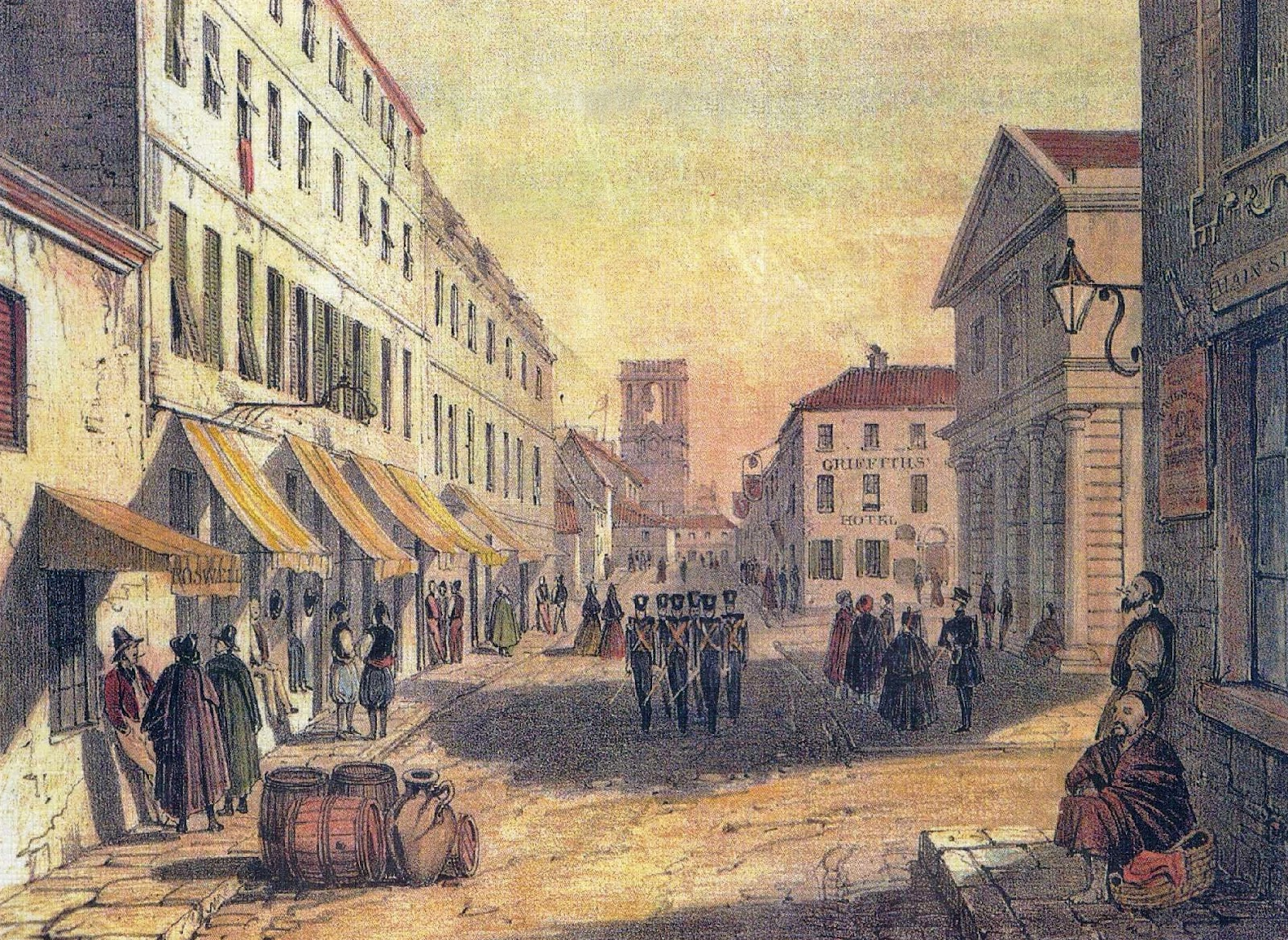
A view of Main Street, Gibraltar in the early 19th century; it was permeated with foul smells from sewage trapped under the roadway

The Spanish water infrastructure continued to be used by the British well after the capture of Gibraltar in 1704. As late as 1863, there was not a single water pipe in the town apart from the Spanish aqueduct. The main source of drinking water, other than the aqueduct, was rainwater that had been collected during the winter. The British military relied on large cisterns mounted on the roofs of buildings to gather rainwater, while ordinary Gibraltarians used barrels and large earthenware pots called tinajas. At the time, most Gibraltarians lived in two- or three-storey buildings with an interior courtyard, called patios, which were occupied by two or three families. They were generally owned either by absentee landlords or the British government, neither of which had much interest in building private cisterns. The courtyards of the patios were thus crowded with barrels and tinajas which supplied the occupants' water during the summer drought. If they ran out, the only other source of water was from pedlars who brought barrels of water in from Spain, charging high prices for the privilege. This encouraged many people to recycle their water as much as possible, reusing the same water for different purposes.

Gibraltar's chronic shortage of water had significant negative consequences for all the inhabitants, civilian and military alike. The military took priority but made no effort to ration or apportion it. The British Army and the Royal Navy effectively competed for the same limited supply. Both required large volumes of water, but the arrival of a fleet could result in Gibraltar's supplies of water and food being consumed suddenly with no provision left over for others who might need it. The rapid growth of Gibraltar's population during the 18th and 19th centuries added to the pressure on the territory's water supply. There was a fivefold increase in numbers between 1784 and 1800, with a further tripling to 16,800 inhabitants by 1814. The old Spanish water supply and rainwater catchments in the town had been manageable for a combined military and civilian population of up to about 3,000 people, but above that level the impact of water shortages became increasingly severe.

The most serious impact was, perhaps not surprisingly, on the state of public health in the territory. The large numbers of water containers standing open across Gibraltar provided an ideal breeding habitat for mosquitoes. Ships carrying cargoes from Africa brought with them the tropical disease yellow fever, which is spread by female mosquitoes carrying the infection. From 1804, Gibraltar suffered five outbreaks of yellow fever; in the first and most devastating, the death toll amounted to 5,733 people out of a total of around 18,000, representing 32 per cent of the population.

The second epidemic coincided with the arrival in 1814 of General Sir George Don as the new Governor of Gibraltar. He ordered that all new buildings were to have a cistern, and instructed that existing cisterns were to be covered. The latter measure would have helped somewhat with the mosquito problem though this could not have been Don's intention, as the relationship between mosquitoes and yellow fever was not yet known – the outbreaks of the disease had been blamed on "miasma" or foul air emanating from the piles of rotting refuse that could be found all over Gibraltar.

A new sewage system was built on Don's orders in 1815, but this was so poorly designed that it actually worsened Gibraltar's sanitary problems. It had no ability to be flushed and was insufficiently inclined to keep the sewage flowing out to the bay. As a result, the system merely brought sewage down from the upper part of the town to the lower part, where it piled up under the main streets. The sewage remained there until the winter rains dislodged it and flushed it into the bay. Because the outfalls were so short, however, the sewage simply washed back up onto the shoreline and resulted in the seafront being coated in a slick of effluent.

Apart from mosquitoes, Gibraltar's cisterns had other major hygiene problems. The water they stored was unfiltered and they were often located alongside functional areas such as kitchens, privies and areas for animals such as poultry. Gibraltar's colony of Barbary macaques added to the problem by fouling the rooftops and cisterns. The water was notionally fresh but in reality the cisterns tended to accumulate unhygienic debris of various types.

The outbreak of the Asiatic Cholera Pandemic reached London by 1831 and Gibraltar by 1832. As with yellow fever, it was attributed to "miasma" and its true cause – contaminated water – was unknown. Gibraltar's garrison was far more badly affected than the civilian population, suffering three times the mortality rate. Even so, the number of deaths was relatively moderate and the British authorities felt little pressure to do anything about the situation despite further outbreaks of cholera in 1848–49 and 1854.

By the mid-19th century, however, reformers in Britain were coming to appreciate the link between sanitation and public health. The discovery by the London doctor John Snow of the link between cholera and sewage-contaminated water led to improvements in water supplies in many British towns and cities. At the same time, the military establishment came to better appreciate the importance of soldiers' living conditions after the experiences of the Crimean War, in which far more died of disease than in battle. This led to improvements being made in the sanitary conditions of the barracks of Gibraltar, through providing better washing facilities and drainage. It also became apparent that Gibraltar's water supplies would be inadequate in the event of another prolonged siege.

A Parliamentary Commission on Barrack and Hospital Improvements was established in 1862 to inquire into the sanitary conditions in Gibraltar and other British Mediterranean possessions. Its conclusions were scathing; there had been no investment in the public water infrastructure in Gibraltar for 150 years, forcing the civilian population to rely entirely on their own resources and ingenuity. The public water storage facilities provided only four to six litres of water per person per day, for all purposes including washing, cooking and drinking – well below the recommended level of nine litres per day. A third of the population did not have access to cisterns or private wells and had to either draw their water from the brackish wells on the isthmus or buy it at exorbitant prices from Spanish water pedlars. One day's supply of six litres of imported water cost as much as a year's supply of water in England. The military, too, was undersupplied, with only seven litres per day for each member of the garrison.

As Garrison-Quartermaster Lt. William Hume put it, "the inhabitants owe nothing to the British Government for the small supply of water they have had for 150 years ... it would appear that from our conquest in 1704 down to within the last 15 years, nothing was done to collect water or to increase the supply, nothing whatsoever." The Commission concluded that the existing water supply was "bad, deficient, and costly", that drainage was "defective" to "very bad" and that sanitation was "most offensive and dangerous to health" for the 16,000 inhabitants and 6,000–7,000 members of the garrison. The water allowances per head were so low that it was "just as if the garrison were in a state of siege" and were "utterly incommensurate to the soldiers' wants in such a climate." A chemical analysis of the water supply showed that it had an "extraordinary" amount of impurities, including excessive amounts of organic matter, nitrates and chlorides. This indicated that sea water and sewage had infiltrated the town's supply of drinking water. The findings led to the old Spanish aqueduct and wells being closed down permanently as it was realised that they posed a severe hazard to public health.

== Late 19th century improvements ==
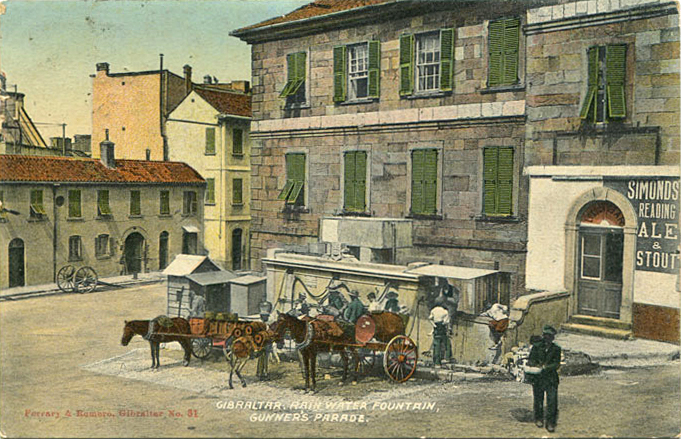
Aguadores (water sellers) filling their barrels at a fountain in Gunner's Parade (now Governor's Parade)

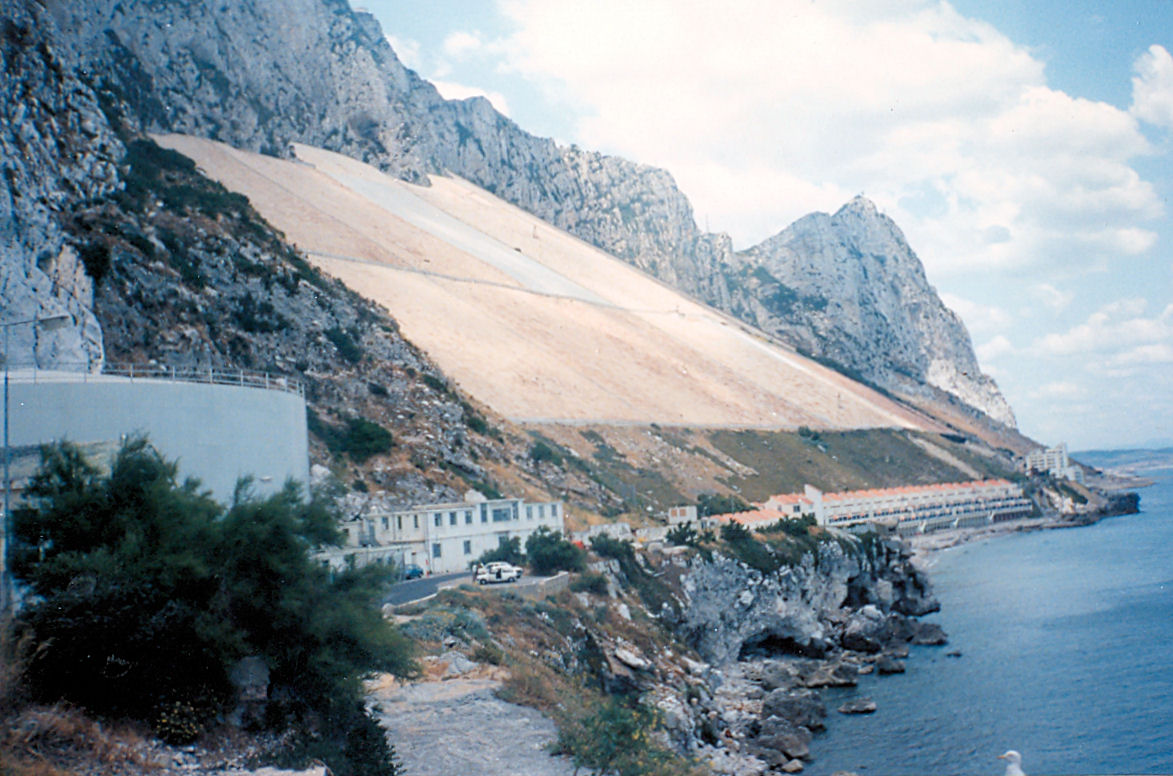
The former water catchments on the east side of the Rock of Gibraltar in 1992

Another cholera outbreak in 1865, which killed several hundred people, prompted the establishment of a Sanitary Commission for Gibraltar. Ironically, the fragmented water provision system in Gibraltar probably hindered the spread of the outbreak as it isolated the contaminated water supplies. Inhabitants who drew their water from private wells or cisterns were far less likely to succumb to the disease than those who relied in public wells or imported Spanish water.

The Commission set about trying to find an alternative supply of drinking water for the town and garrison. It sought to increase the amount of rainwater captured by passing Gibraltar's first Public Health Ordinance in 1869, which ordered that all new dwellings should have underground tanks. At the instigation of the Commission, the British Colonial Office also commissioned the first geological survey of Gibraltar, which was undertaken in 1877 by A.C. Ramsey and J Geikie. Although it produced useful data, it failed to locate any groundwater or aquifers. Borings were carried out on the isthmus between Gibraltar and Spain in an unsuccessful attempt to find potable groundwater, but led to an improved supply of brackish water useful for sanitary purposes. The Commission instigated a system, which is still in use today, of pumping the salty water into a reservoir in the Upper Town from where it was distributed back down into the town for sanitary use. Fresh attempts were made to sink boreholes in 1892 and 1943 but neither attempt was successful in finding drinking water.

Another technological solution was implemented in 1885 – obtaining fresh water from the sea by desalination. This had been proposed as far back as 1869, when it was envisaged that condensers would be used to produce 122 cubic metres (4,300 cu ft) of pure water per day from seawater. The idea was initially rejected due to the high cost but by the mid-1880s concern was growing that Gibraltar's water supply would be inadequate in the event of a new siege. The War Office had a change of heart and agreed to fund the project. The first purified water from the newly installed condensers was produced in March 1885. Because Gibraltar still had no distribution network for drinking water, it could only be delivered from barrels in donkey carts or by hand. Despite the cost, the new water supply enabled the inhabitants of Gibraltar, for the first time in their history, to rely on a source of pathogen-free water. The new system proved its worth only a few weeks after it was installed when cholera broke out in the town of La Línea de la Concepción just across the border with Spain. 191 of La Línea's 12,000 inhabitants died of the disease, but only 22 died in Gibraltar – about five per cent of the death toll in the previous epidemic.

The search for new supplies of water led engineers at the turn of the century to exploit the open expanses of the Upper Rock, where catchments were constructed by clearing vegetation and sealing fissures with cement or grout. This formed smooth expanses of rock, serving as runoff areas that could direct water into channels. Such catchments were primarily used by the military to provide water to the otherwise hard-to-supply batteries and outposts that existed in numerous places around the Upper Rock. In 1903, the city's Chief Engineer came up with a plan to apply the same principle on a massive scale on the Great Gibraltar Sand Dune along the precipitous east side of the Rock in the Sandy Bay area. The 10 acre slope, which has an incline of 35°, was covered with corrugated iron sheets attached to a timber framework. It used an average of 2,400 sheets per acre.

In 1903, an area of 40,000 square metres (430,000 sq ft) was surfaced in this way, followed by a further 56,000 square metres (600,000 sq ft) between 1911 and 1914 and another 40,000 square metres (430,000 sq ft) between 1958 and 1961. The area of the catchments eventually reached 243,000 square metres (2,620,000 sq ft). The water ran off into channels at the foot of the catchments, about 100 metres (330 ft) above the sea, and flowed through a tunnel to reservoirs on the west side of the Rock. Despite their striking appearance, the catchments did not produce a great deal of water – about 60,000 cubic metres (2,100,000 cu ft) in a rainy year. New and more cost-effective methods of desalination made the catchments uneconomic and in 1991 the decision was made to discontinue them, as they were expensive to maintain. They were subsequently dismantled and the slope has since been returned to nature.

== Water supply and sanitation today ==
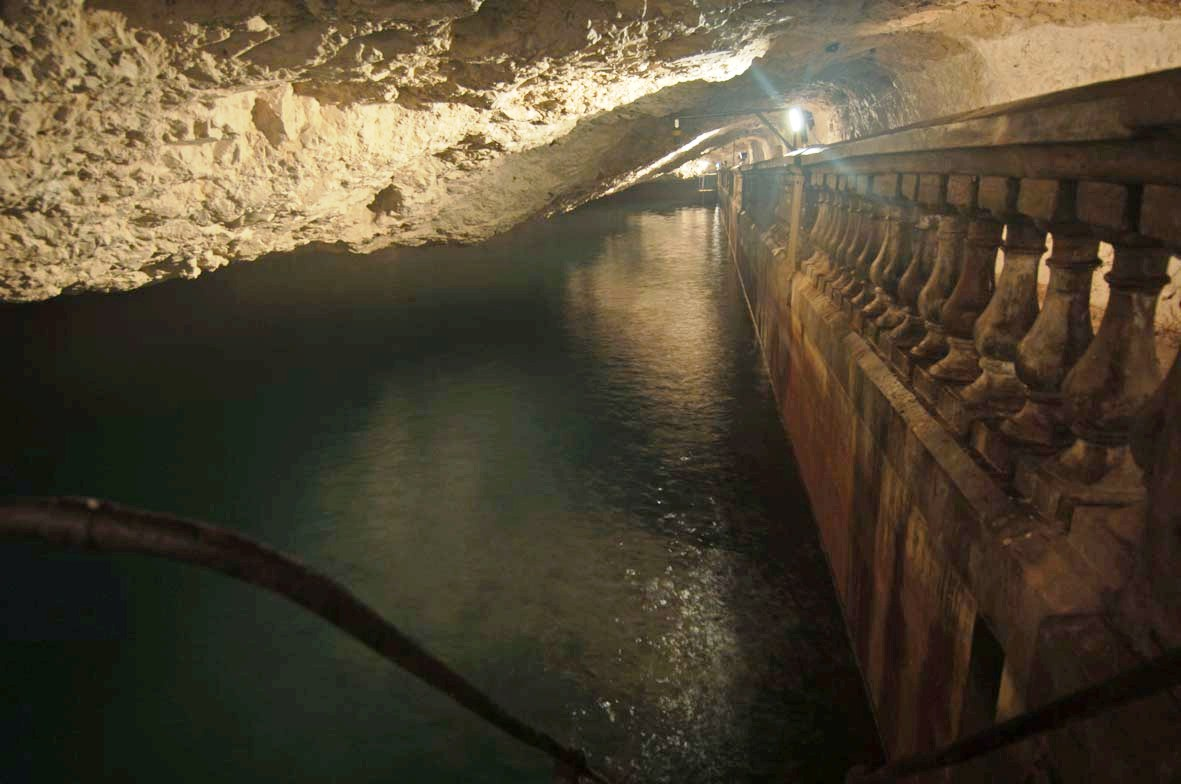
One of the huge reservoirs inside the Rock of Gibraltar that supplies the peninsula with water

Shortages of water between 1949 and 1986 led to the costly temporary expedient of importing water from the United Kingdom, the Netherlands or Morocco. On a few occasions, newly commissioned oil tankers were employed to carry up to 36,000 cubic metres (1,300,000 cu ft) of water at a time, taking advantage of their maiden voyages to the Middle East to carry the water in tanks that had not yet been contaminated with oil products. Such an approach was unaffordable and since 1953, Gibraltar has come to rely on the desalination of sea water, which now accounts for over 90% of the potable water supply. The running costs are high, however, as the energy required means that the cost of acquiring water through desalination is about three times higher than getting it from wells. A refuse incinerator commissioned in 1993 is used to contribute heat to help run the desalination system.

The former systems of catchments and private cisterns have been discontinued. Due to political tensions with Spain over the disputed status of Gibraltar, piping water from the Spanish side of the border has never been seen as a viable option and Gibraltar's water supply is entirely self-contained within the peninsula. The water supply was partly privatised in 1991 and is now maintained by AquaGib, first as a subsidiary of the British water company Northumbrian Water, under licence to the Government of Gibraltar, then from December 2024 in full control of the Gibraltar Government after it bought out Northumbrian Water and became the sole owner of AquaGib.

There are presently two separate public water systems in Gibraltar – one providing potable water and the other salt water for flushing toilets, firefighting, street cleaning and other sanitary purposes. The salt water system pumps nearly 4,000,000 cubic metres (140,000,000 cu ft) annually, about four times the volume of potable water. The potable water system uses twelve reservoirs excavated inside the Rock of Gibraltar. They are supplied by a combination of rainwater and water pumped up from a desalination plant at sea level. For the return journey, the water is pumped to the Moorish Castle reservoir in the upper part of the town before being distributed around the peninsula.

The underground reservoirs were excavated in conjunction with the tunnels of Gibraltar in a series of phases from the 1890s to the 1960s. The first five were constructed from 1898 to 1915, with another four completed between 1933 and 1938. One more incomplete reservoir was temporarily used as a barracks and storehouse for 4th Battalion the Black Watch during the Second World War. After the war, two more reservoirs and auxiliary channels were constructed between 1958 and 1961. The British garrison had its own separate water supply housed within the Rock.

The salt water system is divided into two sectors, serving the north and the south of the peninsula respectively, with two separate pumping stations at sea level. The north part of the system pumps water up from the North Mole to the Calpe Tank and Moorish Castle reservoir on the north side of the Rock. To the south, another pumping station located at Gun Wharf pumps water up to the Europa Road reservoir and a series of tanks and reservoirs at Haynes' Cave, Spyglass, Engineer Road, Queen's Road and Windmill Hill.

=== Sewage ===
As of 2026, Gibraltar's sewage is discharged into the sea from an outflow at Europa Point, as there is no foul water treatment plant on the territory. To comply with the EU Urban Wastewater Treatment Directive, the government issued a proposal in September 2022 for an Urban Wastewater Treatment Plant, with a 25-year contract awarded in June 2025.

== Bibliography ==
- Hills, George (1974). Rock of Contention: A History of Gibraltar. London: Robert Hale & Company. ISBN 978-0-7091-4352-9.
- Jackson, William G. F. (1986). The Rock of the Gibraltarians. Cranbury, NJ: Associated University Presses. ISBN 978-0-8386-3237-6.
- James, Thomas (1771). The History of the Herculean Straits: Now Called the Straits of Gibraltar: Including Those Ports of Spain and Barbary that Lie Contiguous Thereto, volume 2. London: C. Rivington. OCLC 834168591.
- Rose, Edward P.F. (2000). "Fortress Gibraltar". In Rose, Edward P.F.; Nathanail, C. Paul (eds.). Geology and Warfare: Examples of the Influence of Terrain and Geologists on Military Operations. London: Geological Society. ISBN 978-1-8623-9065-2.
- Rose, Edward P.F. (2001). "Military Engineering on the Rock of Gibraltar and its Geoenvironmental Legacy". In Ehlen, Judy; Harmon, Russell S. (eds.). The Environmental Legacy of Military Operations. Boulder, Colorado: Geological Society of America. ISBN 978-0-8137-4114-7.
- Rose, Edward P.F.; Mather, John D.; Perez, Manuel (2004). "British attempts to develop groundwater and water supply on Gibraltar 1800–1985". In Mather, John D. (ed.). 200 Years of British Hydrogeology. London: Geological Society. ISBN 978-1-8623-9155-0.
- Sawchuk, Lawrence A.; Padiak, Janet (2007). "Colonial Management of a Scarce Resource: Issues in Water Allotment in 19th Century Gibraltar". In Juuti, Petri S.; Katko, Tapio S.; Vuorinen, Heikki S. (eds.). Environmental History of Water: Global Views on Community Water Supply and Sanitation. IWA Publishing. ISBN 978-1-8433-9110-4.
