= Seamus Byrne =

Irish rugby union player

- Full name: Seamus Joseph Byrne
- Born: 6 July 1931 Dublin, Ireland

Rugby union career
- Position: Wing
International career
| Years | Team | Apps | (Points) |
| 1953–55 | Ireland | 3 | (12) |

Seamus Joseph Byrne (born 7 June 1931) is an Irish former international rugby union player.

Byrne was raised in County Kildare, and is a brother of Ireland international Frank Byrne.

A wing three-quarter, Byrne is noted as being the first and only Ireland player to have scored a hattrick on international debut, a feat he achieved in a 26–8 win over Scotland at Edinburgh in 1953. He followed it up with his fourth career try in his next match in Swansea, but received only one further Ireland cap.

== See also ==
- List of Ireland national rugby union players
