= AquaGib =

Gibraltarian utility company

Coordinates: 36°8′10.74″N 5°21′8.96″W

AquaGib is the national utility company responsible for water supply and distribution in the British Overseas Territory of Gibraltar. It is responsible for the maintenance and operation of the water supply on the Rock. The company was a joint venture between the Government of Gibraltar and Northumbrian Water. In December 2024 The Gibraltar Government bought out Northumbrian Water and became the sole owner of AquaGib.
