= Saccone =

Saccone is a surname. Notable people with the surname include:

- Mario Saccone (born 1970), Argentine footballer
- Rick Saccone (born 1958), American politician
- Pier Saccone Tarlati di Pietramala (1261–1356), Italian condottiero from Pietramala d'Arezzo, Tuscany
